= 432 Park Avenue =

Residential skyscraper in Manhattan, New York

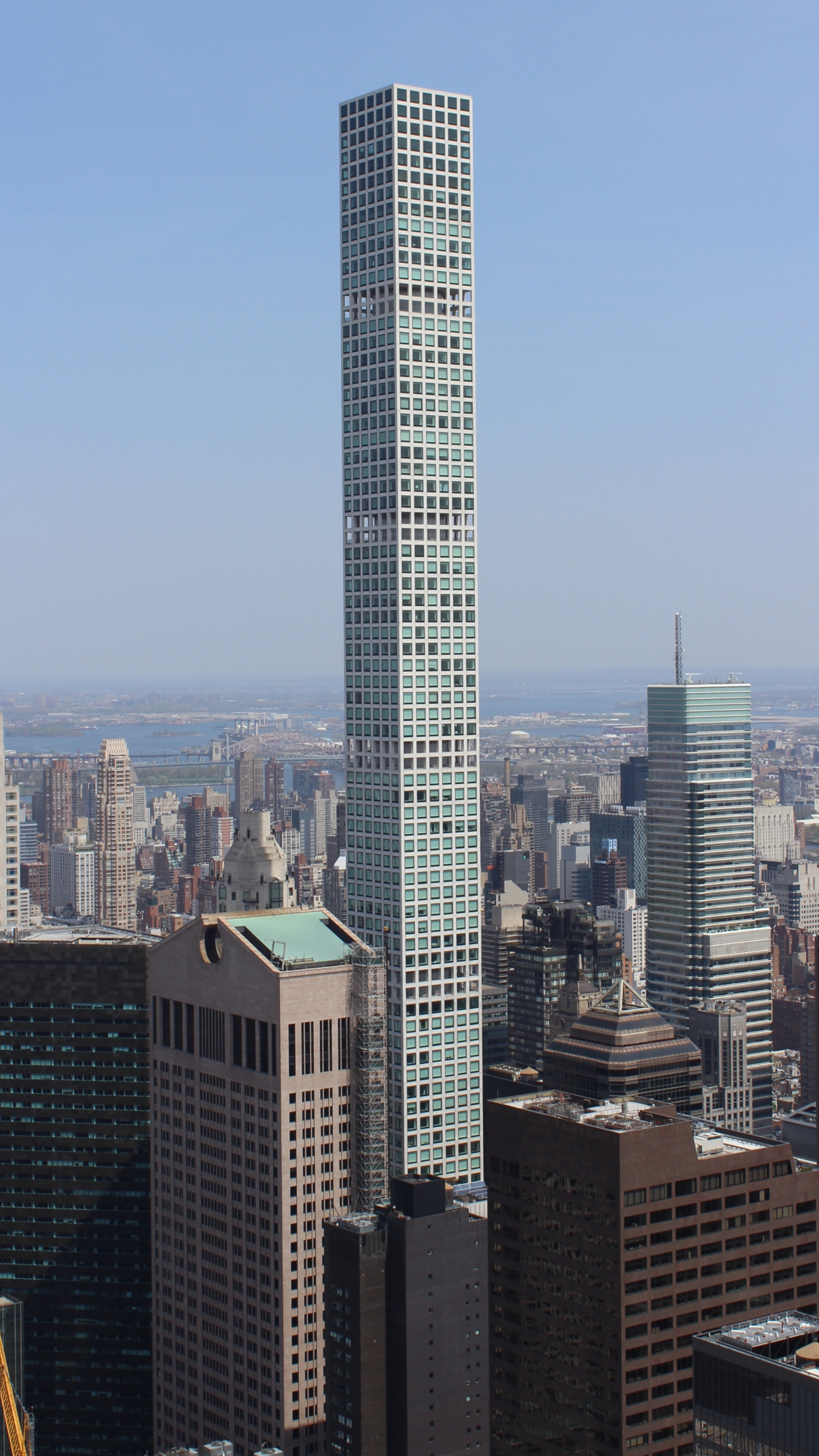
- 432 Park Avenue in 2021

General information
- Status: Completed
- Type: Residential
- Architectural style: Contemporary
- Location: 432 Park Avenue; Manhattan, New York, United States
- Coordinates: 40°45′42″N 73°58′19″W
- Construction started: Foundation: September 2011; Aboveground structure: May 2012
- Topped-out: October 10, 2014
- Completed: December 23, 2015

Height
- Architectural: 1,396 ft (425.5 m)
- Tip: 1,396 ft (425.5 m)
- Top floor: 1,286 ft (392.1 m) (occupied)

Technical details
- Floor count: 85 (+3 below ground) (Note: The top story is labeled as floor 96, but there are six sets of two unused stories. These empty stories are located between each interval of 12 stories, of which there are seven such intervals, giving the building 84 numbered stories. In addition, there is a mezzanine above ground level. This uses the American floor number system, where the ground floor is labeled as floor 1.)
- Floor area: 412,637 square feet (38,335 m^{2})
- Lifts/elevators: 11

Design and construction
- Architects: Rafael Viñoly and SLCE Architects, LLP
- Developer: CIM Group / Macklowe Properties
- Structural engineer: WSP Cantor Seinuk
- Main contractor: Lendlease

Website
- 432parkavenue.com

432 Park Avenue is a residential skyscraper at 57th Street and Park Avenue in the Midtown Manhattan neighborhood of New York City, New York, U.S. The 1,396-foot-tall (425.5 m) tower was developed by CIM Group and Harry B. Macklowe and designed by Rafael Viñoly. A part of Billionaires' Row, 432 Park Avenue has some of the most expensive residences in the city, with the median unit selling from 10.5 to 90 million dollars. At the time of its completion in 2015, 432 Park Avenue was the third-tallest building in the United States and the tallest residential building in the world. As of 2025, it is the sixth-tallest building in the United States, the fifth-tallest building in New York City, and the third-tallest residential building in the world.

432 Park Avenue has 84 numbered stories and a mezzanine above ground. The tower's exterior is a lattice of poured-in-place concrete made with white Portland cement. The tower is segmented into 12-story blocks separated by open double-story mechanical spaces that allow wind gusts to pass through the building. It features 125 condominiums and amenities, such as a private restaurant, for residents. The skyscraper has received mixed reviews from both professionals and the public, with commentary about both its slenderness and its symbolism as a residence for the ultra-wealthy.

432 Park Avenue is located on the site of the former Drake Hotel, which was sold to Macklowe in 2006. The project faced delays for five years because of lack of financing as well as difficulties in acquiring the properties on the site. Construction plans were approved for 432 Park Avenue in 2011 and excavations began the next year. Sales within 432 Park Avenue were launched in 2013; the building topped out during October 2014 and was officially completed in 2015. After the building's completion, residents complained of mechanical and structural problems, leading to multiple lawsuits in the 2020s.

== Site ==
The building is located in the Midtown Manhattan neighborhood of New York City, New York, U.S. It is in the middle of the block bounded by 56th Street to the south, Madison Avenue to the west, 57th Street to the north, and Park Avenue to the east. The roughly L-shaped lot encompasses 34,470 square feet (3,202 m^{2}). The tower is centered within the block, while its base extends east along 56th Street to Park Avenue. The base has a frontage of 75 feet (23 m) on Park Avenue, though its main entrance is on 56th Street. Nearby buildings include Park Avenue Tower to the south, 550 Madison Avenue to the southwest, 590 Madison Avenue to the west, the Fuller Building and Four Seasons Hotel New York to the north, Ritz Tower to the northeast, and 425 Park Avenue to the east.

== Architecture ==
432 Park Avenue was designed by Rafael Viñoly, and SLCE Architects served as the architect of record. The interiors were designed by Deborah Berke and the firm Bentel & Bentel. Other firms involved in construction included structural engineer WSP Cantor Seinuk, MEP engineer WSP Flack and Kurtz, and general contractor Lendlease. The project was developed by Harry B. Macklowe's company, Macklowe Properties.

=== Form and facade ===
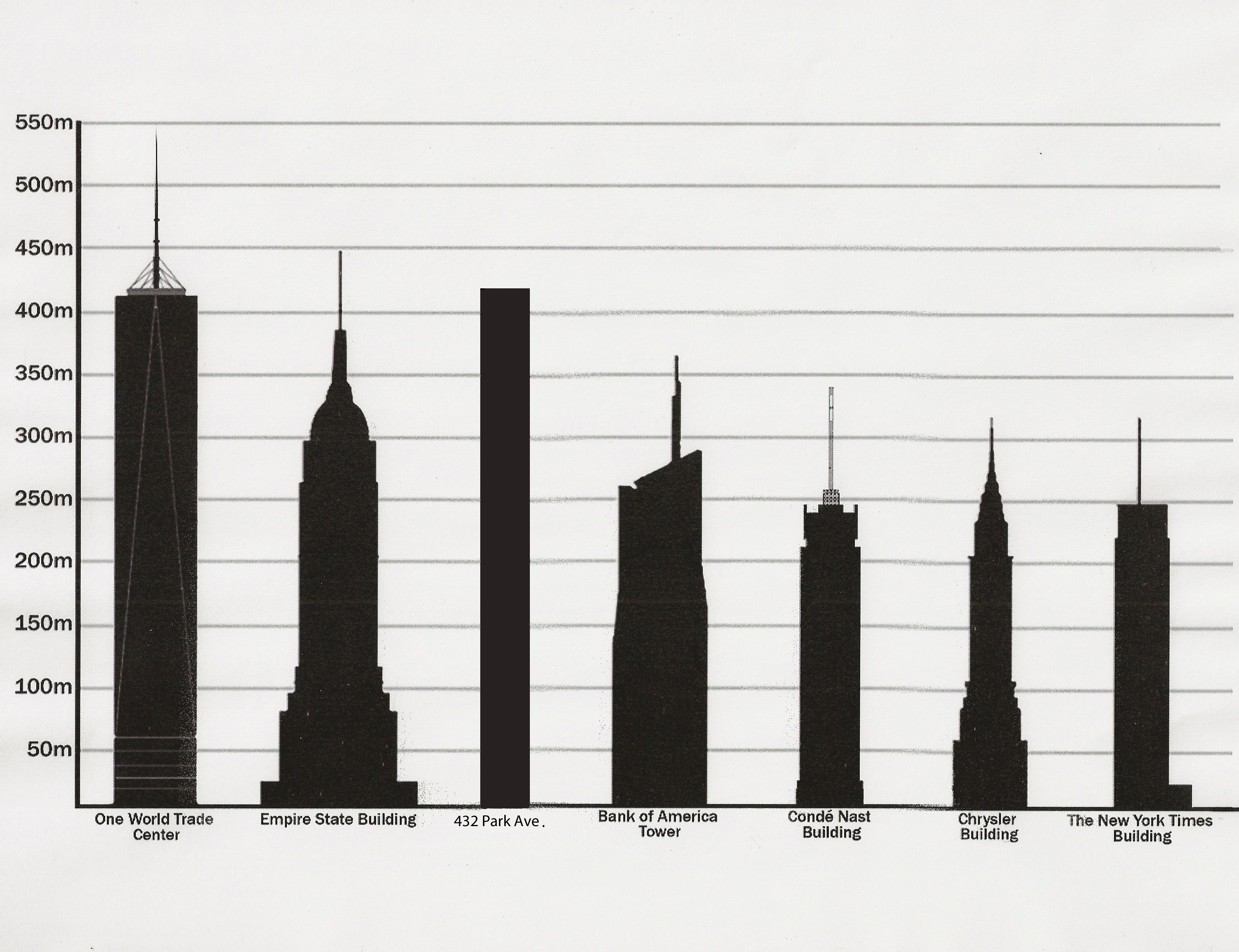
Tallest buildings in New York City by pinnacle height as of 2015. 432 Park Avenue is third from the left.

432 Park Avenue has a mezzanine and 84 numbered stories. Five two-story windbreaks, spaced every 12 floors from the top, are unenclosed. The windbreaks contain modular mechanical services for the six floors above and below to reduce required ducting. The floor numbering system includes mechanical levels near the building's base, so the top story is numbered as floor 96.

When 432 Park Avenue officially topped out at 1,396 feet (426 m), it became the tallest building in New York City by roof height, and the third-tallest by total height, after One World Trade Center and the Empire State Building. The building is so tall, even compared to others in New York City, that its construction required approval from the Federal Aviation Administration. As of 2025, 432 Park Avenue is the 30th-tallest building in the world, the sixth-tallest building in the United States, and the fifth-tallest building in New York City. At 15:1, the height-to-width ratio of 432 Park is one of the most slender in the world. The building's height was permitted by the city's zoning regulations partly because nearly a quarter of the building's floor area is devoted to structural and mechanical equipment, which is excluded from floor area ratio calculations. Due to its slenderness, the building has been characterized as part of a new breed of New York City "pencil towers", and it is particularly susceptible to high winds.

The tower's exterior is a lattice of poured-in-place concrete made from white Portland cement. Viñoly thought the concrete frame, as opposed to an all-glass curtain wall, would reassure residents of the building's sturdiness. Each usable floor features six windows on each elevation of the facade, and each windbreak features two tiers of six unglazed openings per elevation. The facade forms a regular grid of 10-foot-square (3.0 m) apertures. The base is clad with limestone, but no additional finishes were applied to the tower. Viñoly said that the regular lattice was inspired by a 1905 trash can by Austrian designer Josef Hoffmann. The windbreaks were intended to reduce swaying caused by wind, but after the tower was completed, the facade experienced excess wind forces that caused the concrete to crack. Concrete cylinders for mechanical equipment, which were illuminated at night, were placed inside the windbreaks.

Abutting the main tower are a 6,341-square-foot (589.1 m^{2}) plaza designed by Zion Breen Richardson Associates. This plaza has birch trees and a vehicular drop-off. There is also a retail entrance at 56th Street and Park Avenue, an underground retail space, and a four-story office wing on 57th Street. This retail space has a tinted glass facade.

=== Structural features ===
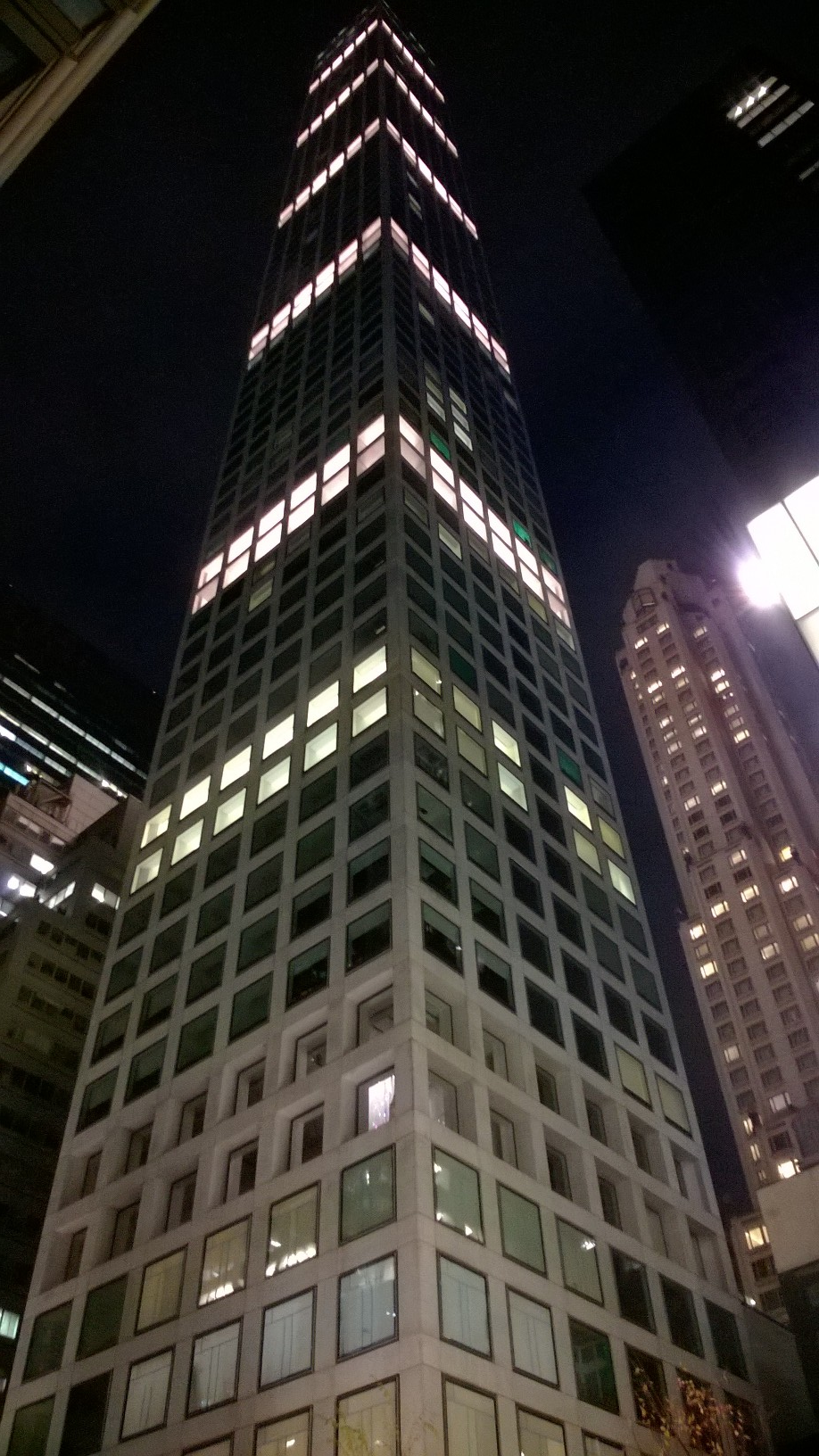
The building's permanent nightly illumination scheme (shown on its unoccupied windbreaks) began on November 14, 2016.

The superstructure is composed of a square, 30-by-30-foot (9.1 m × 9.1 m) reinforced concrete core. This core has 30-inch-thick (76 cm) walls and an outer shell of columns that taper from 5 ft 4 in (1.63 m) wide at the bottom of the tower to 20 in (51 cm) at the top. The core houses the elevator shafts and mechanical services. There are six elevator cabs, including service cabs; the top floors contain two elevator shafts. The tower also contains an emergency-stair shaft with two concrete stairways. To maximize occupiable space, the stairways are installed in a scissor-stair configuration, in which each stairway's flights are installed atop the other's. The distance between the tower's core and the exterior is 27 feet (8.2 m) on all sides.

The floor plates of the tower stories are square with 93-foot (28 m) sides, giving each floor a usable area of 8,255 square feet (766.9 m^{2}). The floor-to-floor height of each story is 15 ft 6 in (4.72 m), of which at least 10 in (25 cm) is the depth of the floor slabs. Upper floors have slabs up to 18 in (46 cm) thick to add more mass, which dampens acceleration from wind loads. To finalize the structural design prior to construction, engineers performed a dynamic analysis for stresses, deflections, and horizontal movements to revise the tower's lateral force resisting system against wind and seismic motion. The design was also placed in a wind tunnel.

The foundation of the building contains about 60 rock anchors that descend 60 to 70 feet (18 to 21 m) into the underlying bedrock, providing stability. The open-air windbreaks are also intended to reduce swaying by decreasing the tower's wind load. To mitigate swaying further, the top of the tower contains two Motioneering designed tuned mass dampers, each weighing 600 short tons (540 long tons; 540 t). The TMDs are placed between the 86th and 89th floors. Viñoly's team decided to install the TMDs after simulating the tower's projected wind forces at the Marine Institute of Memorial University of Newfoundland. Several additional dampers are located in the outriggers of some of the mechanical floors.

=== Interior ===
The finalized plans called for 147 apartments in total: 122 luxury condominium units of one to six bedrooms between floors 34 and 96, and 25 studio units on floors 28 and 29. The highest units, on floors 91 through 96, contain layouts that differ from those of the units on the floors below. The tower's condominium units feature 15 ft 6 in (4.72 m)-high ceilings. The smallest unit is a 351-square-foot (32.6 m^{2}) studio, while the largest unit is the 8,255-square-foot (766.9 m^{2}), six-bedroom, seven-bath apartment on floor 96, with its own library. A sample medium-sized unit, #35B, covers 4,000 square feet (370 m^{2}) with three bedrooms and four-and-a-half baths, facing south and west with views of Central Park to the northwest. Macklowe initially placed thick frames on some of the windows, as he wanted to highlight the views of Central Park, but some tenants removed these frames because they took up interior space.

The building's amenities include 12-foot (3.7 m) ceilings, golf training facilities, and private dining and screening rooms. On floor 12 is an 8,500-square-foot (790 m^{2}) private restaurant with a 5,000-square-foot (460 m^{2}) private terrace, which has been led by chef Shaun Hergatt since 2016. Floors 12 through 16 comprise a "club unit" with a fitness center; a swimming complex with a 75-foot-long (23 m) pool, whirlpool, sauna, and steam room; private meeting rooms, including a 14-seat boardroom; and a library curated by Assouline Publishing. The Atlantic magazine described the screening room as having velvet armchairs and the meeting room as having mahogany paneling. Macklowe branded these amenities as the "432Club".

== History ==
=== Early plans ===
==== Macklowe acquisition ====
432 Park Avenue was the second supertall skyscraper in Billionaires' Row to be built, after One57. The first piece of the site to be acquired was the Drake Hotel at the corner of Park Avenue and 56th Street. The Drake, a 21-story, 495-room hotel, had been constructed in 1926 but, by the early 2000s, no longer attracted the celebrity clientele of its heyday. In January 2006, the hotel's owner, Host Hotels & Resorts, was intending to sell the property "in the mid-$400 million range", primarily marketing the site with the prospect of replacing the aging hotel with a mixed-use skyscraper. Harry Macklowe purchased the Drake that year for $418 million (equivalent to $680 million in 2025 (Note: Johnston, Louis; Williamson, Samuel H. (2023). "What Was the U.S. GDP Then?". MeasuringWorth. United States Gross Domestic Product deflator figures follow the MeasuringWorth series.)). Macklowe paid French delicatessen company Fauchon $4 million to shorten the terms of their lease on the Drake Hotel's ground floor, requiring them to vacate in April 2007 instead of 2016. Shortly afterward, Fauchon sued Macklowe in New York Supreme Court claiming that the developer was harassing the store to leave; a judge ruled that Macklowe could not interfere with the store's operation before the lease expired.

Macklowe's next acquisition consisted of a 150-foot-wide (46 m) assemblage on 57th Street, consisting of a 13-story building and five 5-story townhouses. In April 2007, Macklowe purchased the Buccellati store at 46 East 57th Street for $47.5 million. This followed Macklowe's purchase of the Audemars Piguet store at 40 East 57th Street for $19.2 million, the Franck Muller store at 38 East 57th Street for $60 million, as well as 44 and 50 East 57th Street for $41 million. Following over 14 months of negotiations, Macklowe also had to pay Audemars Piguet $16.6 million to end their lease early and move across the street to 137 East 57th Street. The total cost of additional nearby parcels and air rights brought the acquisition cost to over $724 million. These purchases gave Macklowe a large L-shaped site between 56th and 57th Streets. In early 2007, Macklowe Properties secured a $543 million mortgage from Deutsche Bank on the site. Macklowe reportedly planned a 65-story Armani-branded tower that would consist of three stories of retail, offices until the 20th floor, topped by a 10-story hotel and 33 floors of residential space. Nordstrom had signed a letter of intent to open their first New York store, a 253,500 square feet (23,550 m^{2}) flagship, at the building's base.

Macklowe had been in contract to purchase the Turnbull & Asser storefront at 42 East 57th Street for $33 million but the company's owner executed a call option in the store's lease to allow him to buy the building for $31.5 million instead. Jacob & Co's founder Jacob Arabo demanded $100 million for the store's building at 48 East 57th Street, a price Macklowe was unable to pay. These holdouts meant Macklowe was unable to connect the other buildings he owned on East 57th Street, depriving Nordstrom of the space needed for the store's ground floor entrance. Nordstrom also reportedly required a 18-foot-high (5.5 m) ceiling, which was not feasible at the site. This caused Nordstrom to back out of the deal and instead open their flagship in Central Park Tower several blocks west on 57th Street. In October 2007, the New York City Department of Buildings issued demolition permits for the site; at the time, the demolition cost was estimated at $6 million, or roughly $15 per square foot ($160/m^{2}).

==== Financial crisis ====
During the 2008 financial crisis, Macklowe defaulted on the Deutsche Bank loan which was due in November 2007. That October, Harry Macklowe had personally repaid $156.3 million of Macklowe Property's debt on the site, bringing his personal investment in the project to over $250 million. The repayment included $38 million of mezzanine loans with a 15 percent interest rate that were held by Vornado Realty Trust. The project's estimated cost had reached by $750 million by early 2008, and Macklowe was unable to find an equity partner to finance part of the tower. That May, hotelier Kirk Kerkorian and investment company Dubai World reportedly considered purchasing the site for $200 million in addition to assuming the existing debt on the property. Macklowe also talked to potential investors, whose proposals he rejected because they intended to add affordable housing or hotel space.

The bank sued in August 2008 to begin foreclosure on the loan (which had amortized down to $482 million at the time) and take control of the development site. Deutsche Bank had divided the loan into 21 tranches and sold much of the debt to ten different investors including Highland Capital Management and Sorin Capital Management, earning tens of millions of dollars in fees. The bank retained just $12 million of the loan on its own balance sheet. During the height of the recession in November 2008, one of the investors, iStar Financial, was unable to find any buyers for its $224 million tranche of the debt for $160 million, representing just over 71 cents on the dollar. Initially, over 20 bidders were believed to be interested including Apollo Global Management, The Related Companies, and Silverstein Properties. Only a half-dozen bidders eventually offered between $100 million and roughly $130 million, or 45 and 58 cents on the dollar respectively.

==== Paul Manafort and CMZ Ventures ====
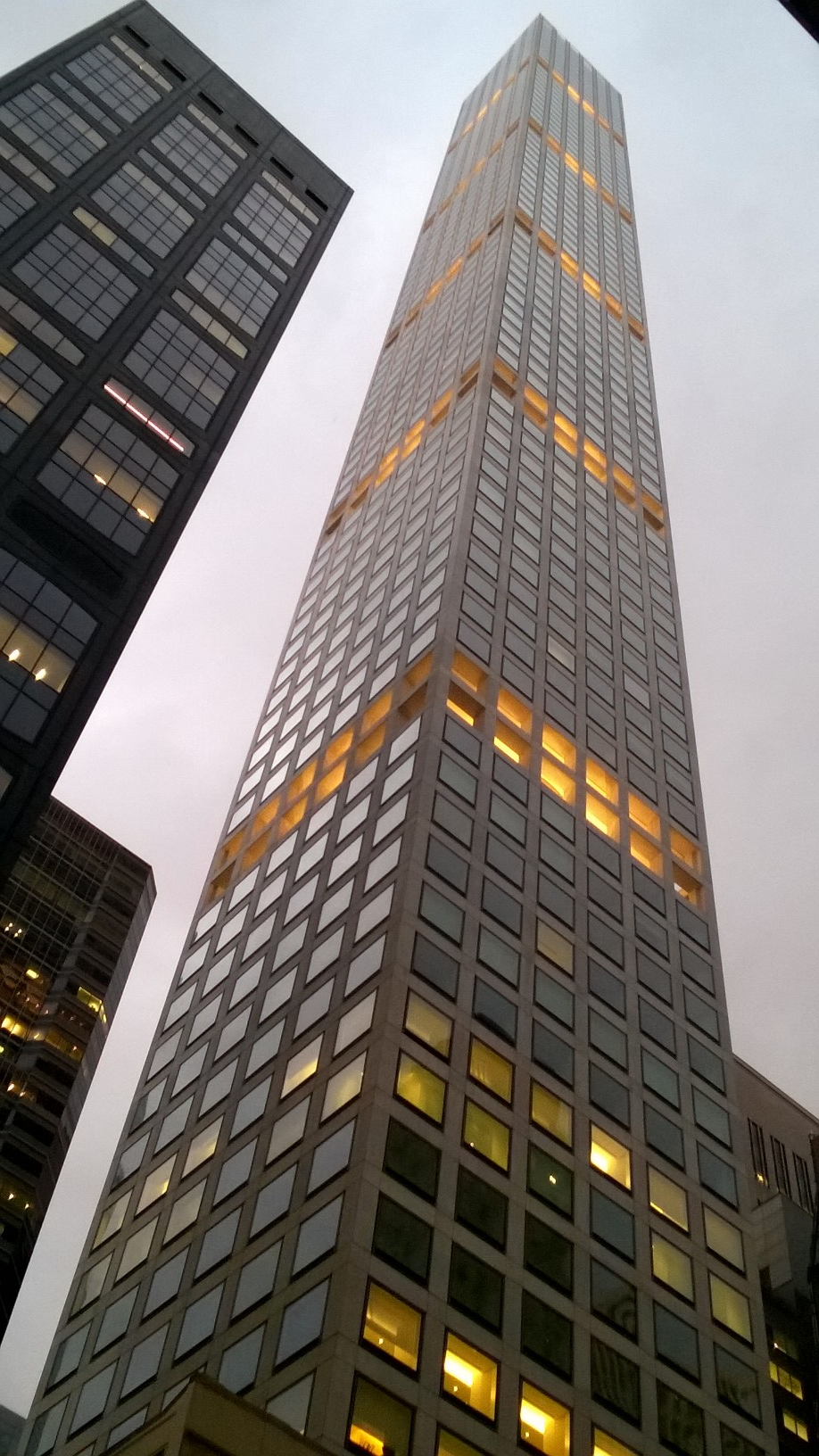
Seen from ground level

In late 2007, Joseph Sitt, founder of Thor Equities, introduced Macklowe to an investment firm named CMZ Ventures. The letters "CMZ" represented Arthur G. Cohen, a New York real estate developer; Paul Manafort, a former lobbyist, political consultant, and lawyer; and Brad Zackson, a frequent partner of Manafort and Fred Trump.

In 2008, CMZ Ventures agreed to pay $850 million for the development site, paying off the Deutsche Bank loan and making Macklowe a small profit. In fact, the purchase price was higher even than the appraised value of $780 million, a premium of over 10 percent which was unheard of for development site purchases. The partners wanted to build a 700,000-square-foot (65,000 m^{2}) skyscraper with a Bulgari-branded luxury hotel, condominiums, a private club, and a vertical mall. In late 2008, Dmytro Firtash, a Ukrainian natural gas oligarch and alleged associate of Russian organized crime, agreed to fund $112 million in equity and paid Manafort a deposit of $25 million. The deposit was wired from a Raiffeisen Zentralbank account that U.S. officials alleged was a front for Russian organized crime "boss of bosses" Semion Mogilevich. Manafort had met Firtash while consulting for the pro-Russia Party of Regions, at the time the ruling political party in Ukraine. French fund Inovalis offered to buy a 50% stake in the project for $850 million and agreed to arrange another $500 million of equity for the project from various backers. Ultimately, the bid fell apart when CMZ could not arrange the necessary financing.

In 2011, the former prime minister of Ukraine, Yulia Tymoshenko, alleged in the United States District Court for the Southern District of New York that Firtash violated the Racketeer Influenced and Corrupt Organizations Act. Specifically, Tymoshenko stated that Firtash had used CMZ as a front organization for funds that he skimmed unlawfully from RosUkrEnergo, the natural gas company that he jointly controlled with Russian state-owned enterprise Gazprom. Tymoshenko also alleged that Firtash planned to use the money for political purposes, rather than as a real estate investment; specifically, she claimed that the money would go to help her opponent, Victor Yanukovych, who became Ukraine's president in 2010.

Another CMZ Ventures investor was Oleg Deripaska, a Russian oligarch and leader of the world's second-largest aluminum company Rusal, who was sanctioned by the U.S. government in 2017. Deripaska agreed to invest $56 million into 432 Park Avenue through an investment fund named Pericles which was managed by Rick Gates, a Manafort partner who has since pleaded guilty to conspiracy against the United States and making false statements in the investigation into Russian interference in the 2016 United States elections.

==== CIM Group investment ====
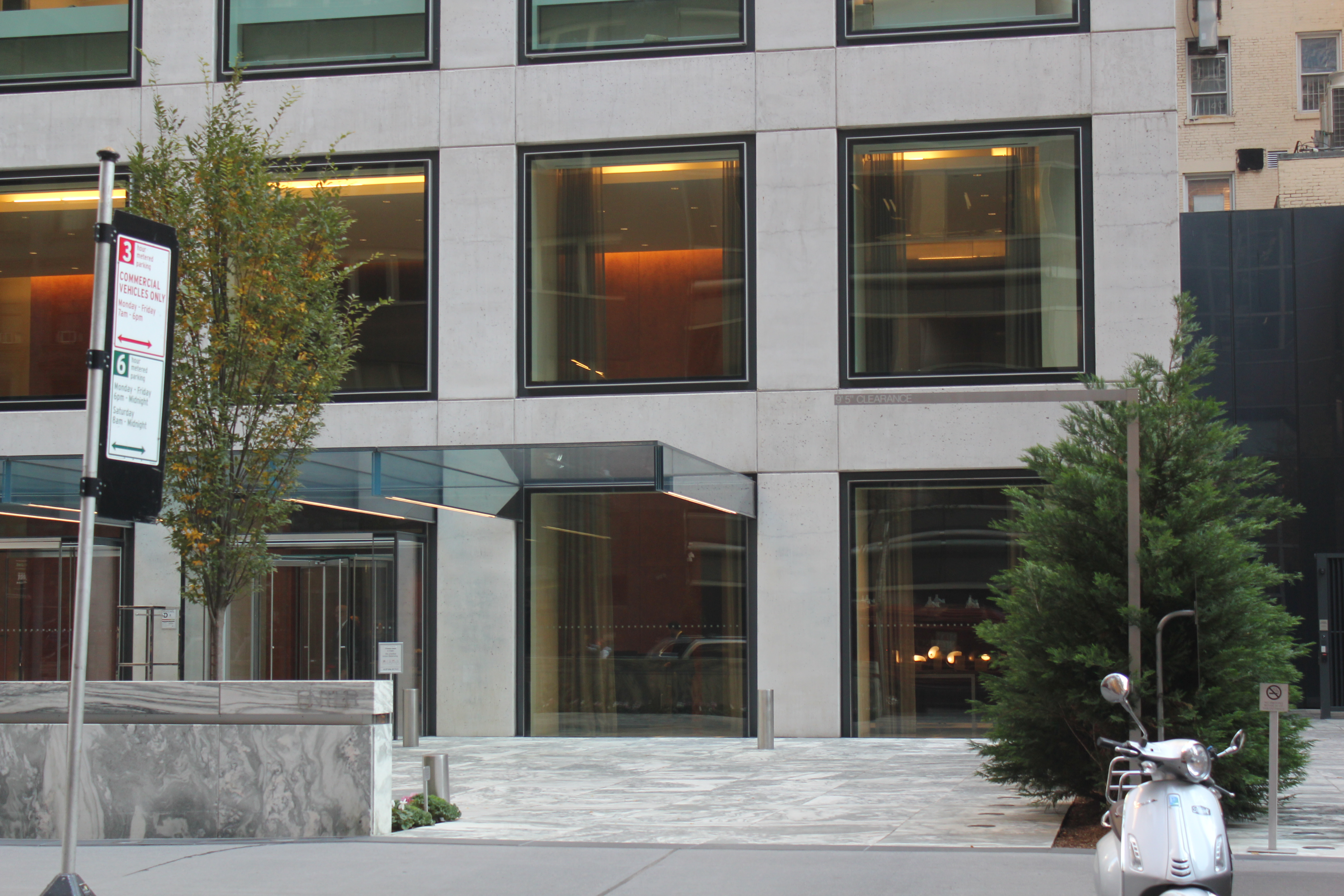
Porte-cochère on 56th Street

In January 2010, CIM Group agreed to pay $305 million for the complete development site including 434 Park Avenue and 38, 40, 44 and 50 East 57th Street while keeping Macklowe involved as a partner. The investment by CIM allowed Macklowe to repay the senior-most tranche 90 cents on the dollar while the junior-most tranches were completely wiped out. At the time, the site was considered one of New York's most valuable due to its location between East 56th and 57th Streets on the west side of Park Avenue. Citigroup's private banking arm raised an additional $415 million in equity for the project from high-net-worth individuals who invested $1 million to $5 million each. Another $100 million in equity came from CIM's existing institutional investor clients. Following the investment, CIM continued to expand the development site, purchasing 46 East 57th Street for $42.5 million in January 2011.

CIM and Macklowe were sued by Franck Muller in September 2010 after the company tried to evict the watch retailer from their space at 38 East 57th Street that Macklowe had purchased several years earlier for over $60 million. The building was master-leased to a real estate investment company, Sovereign Partners, who in turn had subleased the ground floor and mezzanine space to Franck Muller until 2018. CIM and Macklowe had purchased that master lease for $5.35 million in November 2008, making a CIM-owned company Franck Muller's new landlord. Subsequently, CIM and Macklowe had the building reappraised by Cushman & Wakefield who determined that the fair market rent for the space was $1.4 million per year, higher than the rent initially agreed to by Sovereign Partners. However, the CIM-owned company that had purchased Sovereign Partners' lease failed to pay this increased rent, leading to an event of default under the lease and allowing CIM and Macklowe to begin the eviction process. Franck Muller objected, claiming that CIM was essentially choosing not to pay itself the increased rent and manufacturing an excuse to evict the CIM-owned master lessee and in turn Franck Muller, the sublessee. In October, a New York Supreme Court ordered the case be determined through arbitration instead.

The developers received a $30 million mortgage from Pacific Northwestern Bank on the site in early April 2011. Later that month, CIM filed dummy permits for a 5-story office building in order to begin excavation work on the site. Macklowe, speaking at a real estate conference that May, claimed the building would be "monumental" and a "capstone" to his career.

=== Design ===
The developers hired Rafael Viñoly to design the new tower in mid-2011. Macklowe and Viñoly had been longtime friends, and although CIM had approved of Viñoly's selection, Macklowe wanted the design to impress his partners. The two men presented plans for a concrete tower with waffle-like rectangular openings on each side. Though Viñoly and Macklowe were friends, they argued over the design details, such as the inclusion of seating near windows or whether the building should have a pinnacle. Viñoly and Macklowe often insulted each other over the various perceived flaws in the design. Viñoly called Macklowe "a truck driver with an education in aesthetics", while Macklowe said that Viñoly's supertall design was motivated by "penis envy" among the city's developers, who were vying to build the tallest structures. Viñoly reportedly joked that the design had a "couple of screw-ups", such as Macklowe's window frames, the placement of the restrooms, and Berke's interior design; he later apologized for his comments.

In October 2011, plans were revealed for a 1,300 feet (400 m) tall condominium tower on the site using the address 432 Park Avenue. Previously, CIM had reportedly considered using the building's lower floors as a luxury hotel similar to nearby One57 and spoken to operators including Mandarin Oriental Hotel Group, Taj Hotels, and One&Only Resorts. The next month, CIM purchased Turnbull & Asser's storefront at 42 East 57th Street for $32.4 million and concurrently sold the nearby 50 East 57th Street to the clothier for $31.5 million, allowing CIM to expand their development site and Turnbull & Asser to remain on the same block. In December 2011, LVMH reportedly considered investing in the site for an expansion of the company's "Cheval Blanc" luxury hotel chain, creating a campus with the company's nearby LVMH Tower.

=== Construction ===
==== Early progress ====
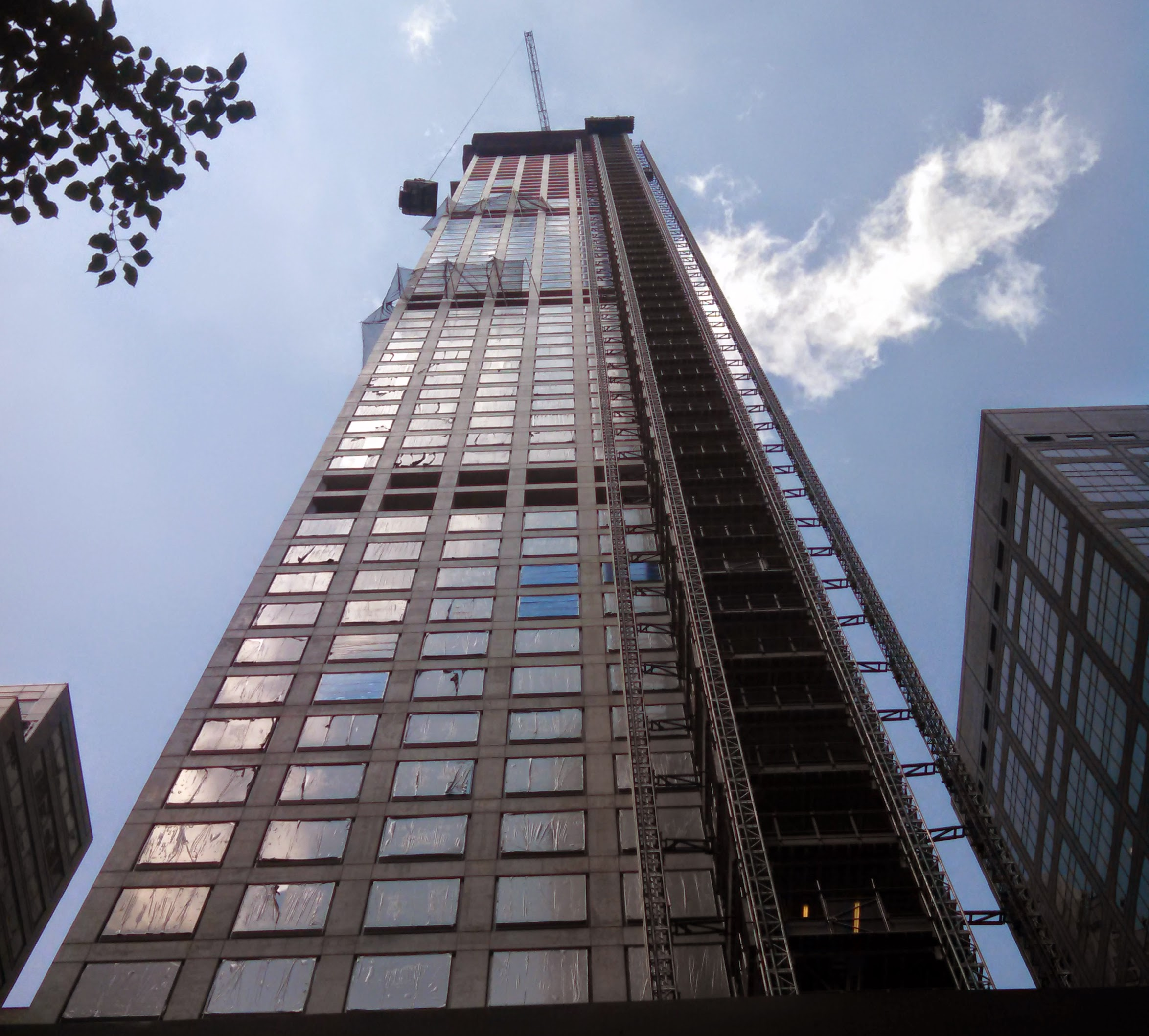
Ground up view from 56th Street in July 2014

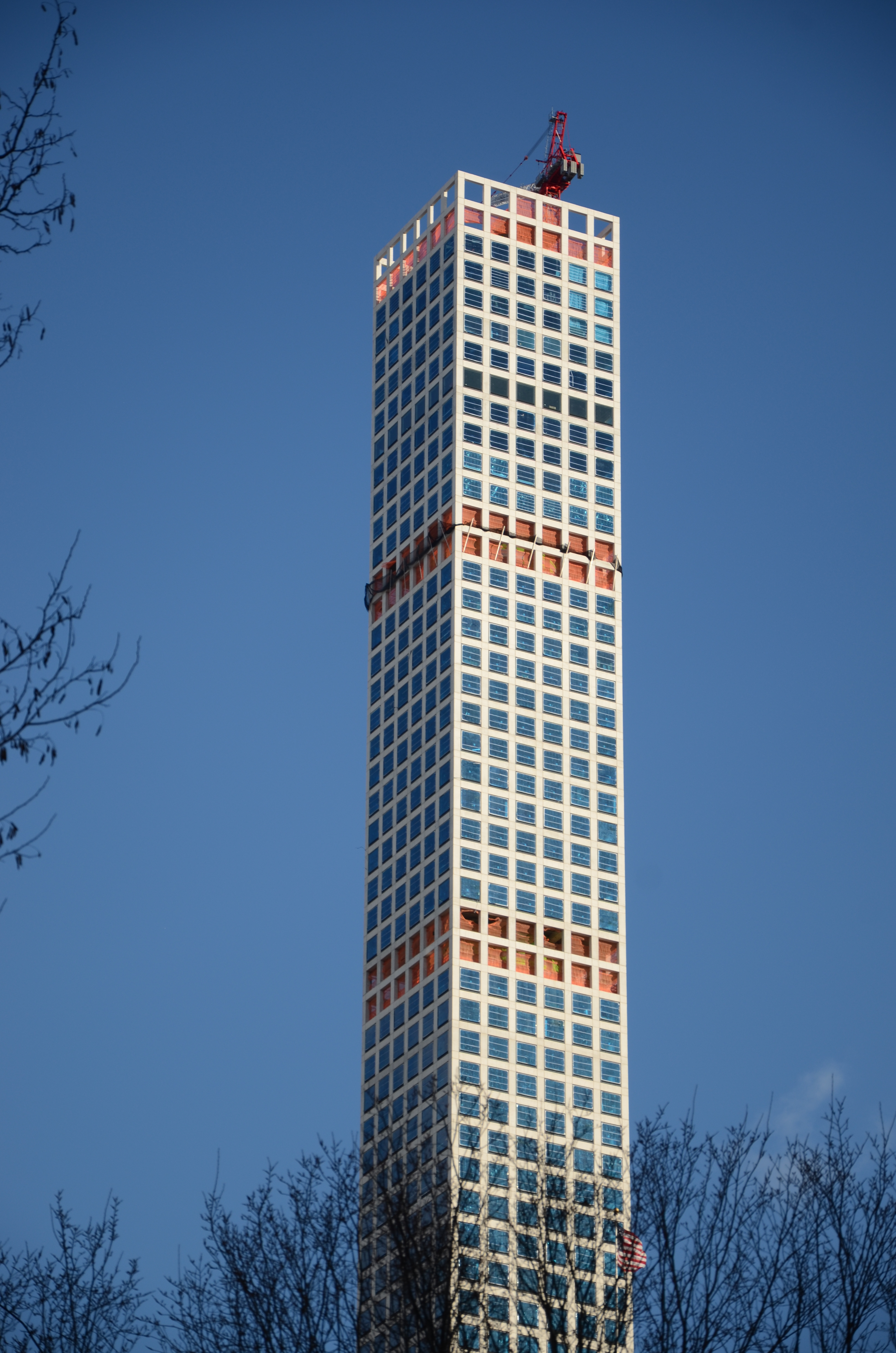
Under construction in March 2015

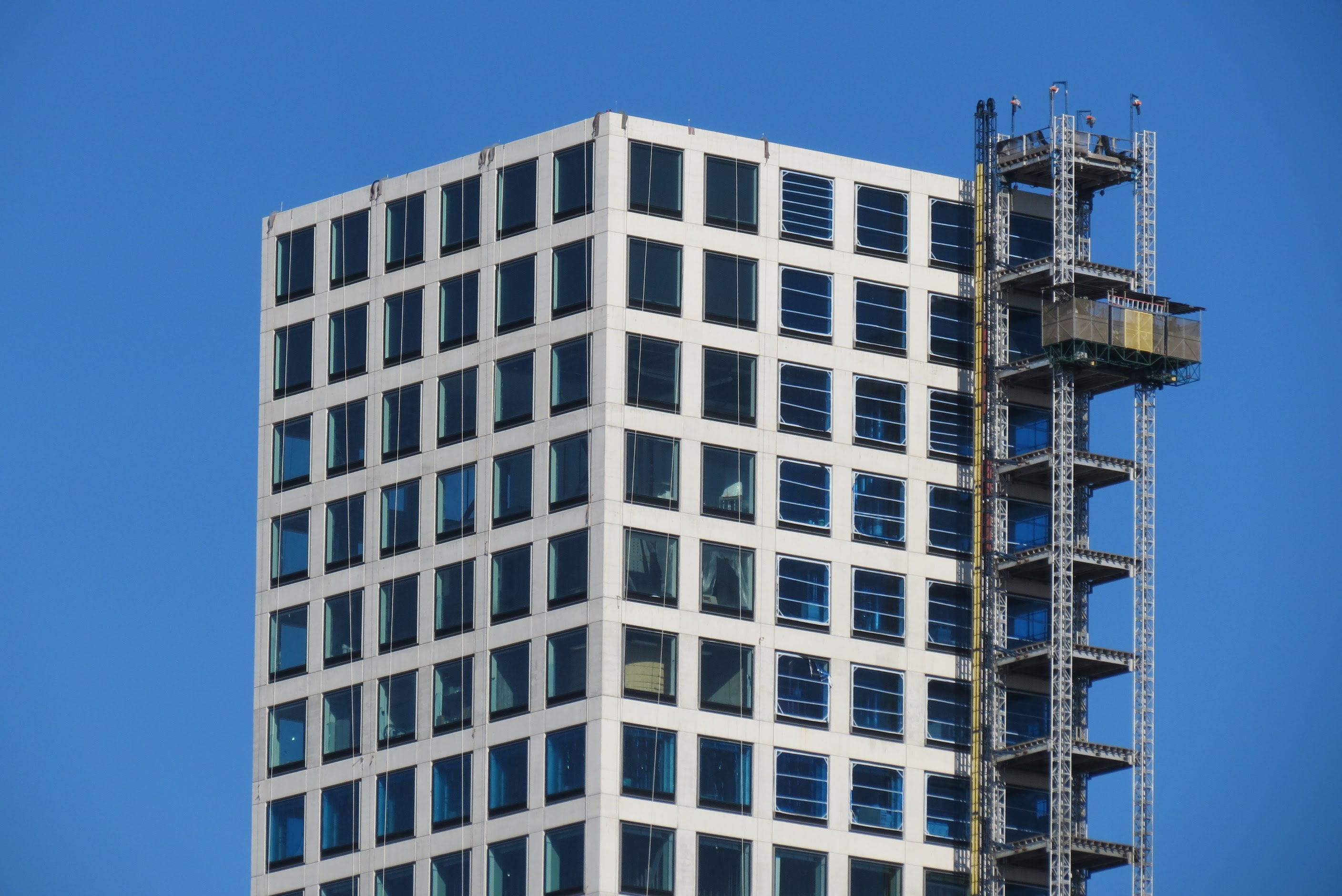
Under construction in October 2015

Excavation for the building's foundations began in early 2012. In March, CIM filed plans for the full building, revealing its 82-story, 1,397-foot (426 m) height. The New York City Department of Buildings issued the construction permit two months later. By September 2012, the building's concrete foundation had been completed and the tower crane had been installed. The building passed street level by the end of the year. As construction progressed, 432 Park's developers raised asking prices for the building's units several times. A brochure in June 2012 indicated that units would cost $4,500 per square foot ($48,000/m^{2}), but that rate had increased to $5,800 per square foot ($62,000/m^{2}) by September 2012. By March 2013, asking prices had reached $6,742 per square foot ($72,570/m^{2}).

The project's second crane was installed in early 2012. In October 2012, the development also received $400 million in construction financing from hedge fund The Children's Investment Fund Management. The construction loan carried a low loan-to-value ratio of under 40 percent but an unusually high interest rate of over 10 percent per year. However, the loan was also nonrecourse meaning that the lender could not go after CIM or Macklowe's other assets if they defaulted on the construction loan. There were also disputes over the composition of the concrete, as the facade was required to be all-white while also being durable. The developers rejected the idea of using fly ash in the concrete, which would have strengthened the material but also darkened it; as a result, the final mixture began cracking when it was built.

Construction was temporarily halted in February 2013 after crews damaged a neighboring building and the Department of Buildings gave the project several safety violations. Though work resumed within the month, a worker was injured in an on-site construction accident that March, when a piece of wood dropped from the fifth story. In mid-2013, developers filed a revision to the plan to add another floor. This was achieved by converting floor 95, a formerly double-height story, into two separate stories of standard height.

===== Sales launch and completion =====
Also in March, sales officially launched with units being listed at between $2 million to $82.5 million apiece. At the time, the developers claimed more than a third of the building's units were already under contract. The sales office, located in the nearby General Motors Building at 767 Fifth Avenue, had a lobby, displays of Macklowe's earlier projects, and models of rooms at 432 Park Avenue. To assist with marketing, Macklowe spent $1 million on a four-minute film that would air exclusively in the sales center. The film, directed by Danny Forster and filmed at Silvercup Studios, follows a young woman leaving her English country house in a 1957 Rolls-Royce and taking a Learjet to her new home at 432 Park Avenue. The film also featured famed French high-wire artist Philippe Petit dangling from a helicopter, music by Cass Elliot, references to Mies van der Rohe's Barcelona Pavilion and the Pantheon, and depictions of King Kong, Le Corbusier, Al Capone, and Anna May Wong. Richard Wallgren—who had previously led sales at another luxury development, 15 Central Park West—was hired as the main broker for 432 Park Avenue's apartments. Macklowe also sometimes personally met with potential buyers.

432 Park Avenue passed the 1,000-foot (300 m) mark in June 2014. The topping out ceremony was held on October 10, 2014, signifying that the building had reached its maximum height. 432 Park Avenue was nearly completed in January 2015 when work was temporarily halted again after another construction accident. That year, Macklowe acquired another property at 36 East 57th Street for demolition. In November 2015, Macklowe added a team from brokerage Douglas Elliman to supplement the developer's internal sales team tasked with selling the tower's units. By early 2016, several websites reported that 432 Park had been officially completed on December 23, 2015. The building had cost about $2,500 per square foot ($27,000/m^{2}). The first residential sale was finalized in December 2016.

=== Post-opening ===
==== 2010s ====
After the building was finished, its condominium board was originally controlled by five CIM representatives and one resident—typical of new condominium buildings in New York state, whose boards were generally initially controlled by the building's developers. Residents reported leaks and cracks, and one resident claimed she had to use the freight elevator. At the time, the allegations were treated as rumors. Meanwhile, a clause in the board's bylaws prevented residents from taking over the board until December 2021 or until 90% of the apartments were sold, whichever came later. Residents alleged that the original board reportedly obstructed efforts to repair issues with the building.

In June 2016, Macklowe Properties agreed to pay $411.1 million to acquire the building's retail component from CIM. Macklowe's stake amounted to $15.7 million. Boutique watch store Richard Mille subsequently leased part of the ground-floor retail space that December. The 4,200-square-foot (390 m^{2}), two-story Richard Mille store opened in October 2018; at the time, it was the only retail tenant. Two months later, auction house Phillips signed a contract for retail space, consisting of 55,000 square feet (5,100 m^{2}) at the base of the building, as well as 30,000 square feet (2,800 m^{2}) underground, with plans to move into the space in May 2020. By the end of 2018, John Barrett also agreed to open a 6,300-square-foot (590 m^{2}) salon on the building's second floor and boutique perfumery Amaffi leased 4,000 square feet (370 m^{2}) on the ground floor. Joanne Podell, broker for Cushman & Wakefield, stated in 2019 that she had to promise lower rents in order to attract retail tenants.

Linda Macklowe filed for divorce from Harry Macklowe in 2016, and a trial was held between September and December 2017 to determine how their fortune should be split. During the trial, Linda claimed that Harry had illegally shrunk a condo on the building's 78th floor that Linda had agreed to purchase for $14.4 million. The couple had initially agreed to purchase separate, adjacent condominiums on the 78th floor in 2013, with Linda occupying a smaller "A" unit and Harry a larger "B" unit. After paying a deposit of $2.2 million, Linda claimed that the developers delayed closing four times and downsized her unit by transferring some floor area to Harry's neighboring unit. At the end of the trial, Linda chose not to move into her Park Avenue unit. Instead, she remained at the couple's penthouse in the nearby Plaza Hotel and dropped her lawsuit over the unit's shrinkage in exchange for the return of her $2.2 million deposit. The divorce trial also revealed that Macklowe had earned far less from 432 Park Avenue than originally anticipated; sources disagree on the exact amount, but The Real Deal estimated his profit at $2.5 million.

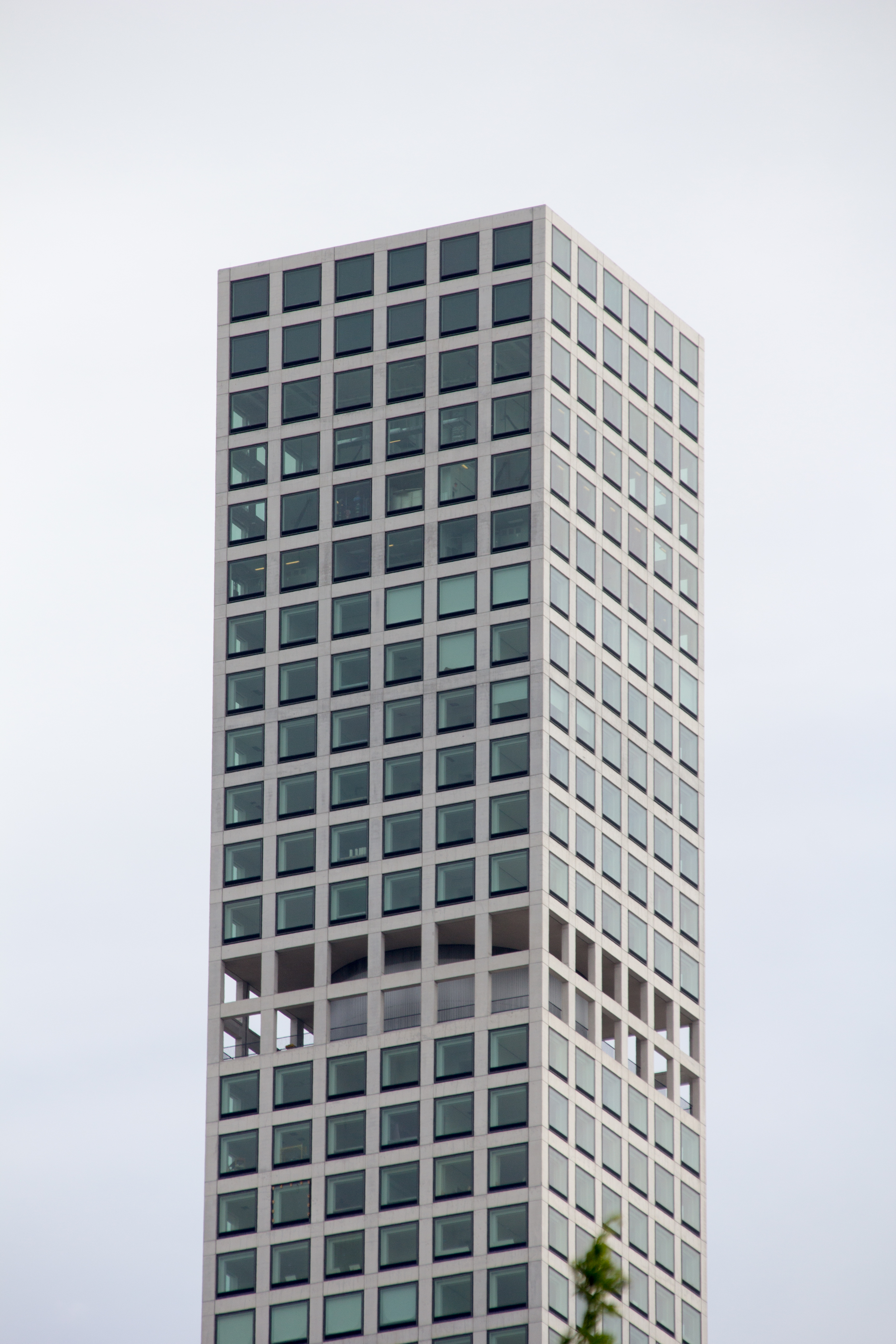
Top of 432 Park Avenue following its completion. Twelve floors below the top is one of the five two-story windbreaks, which are unenclosed and serve to reduce the tower's wind load.

Following his subsequent marriage to Patricia Landeau, Macklowe installed a 1,008-square-foot (93.6 m^{2}) portrait of the couple taken by Studio Harcourt on the northwest corner of the tower's retail space in March 2019. The wedding's 200-person reception took place on the building's 78th floor in a condo that was turned into a temporary ballroom. The building also hosted an event for theater director Robert Wilson's Watermill Center as part of the Park Avenue Armory's "Armory Week" of art sales in January 2018. The event, attended by Macklowe, Zac Posen, and Claude Grunitzky, was notable for employing multiple nude performers in a departure from the more classically focused events of Armory Week which centered on 18th and 19th century art.

==== 2020s ====
The New York Times published residents' allegations of defects and complaints about the building in early 2021. According to the report, a leak at a mechanical floor forced two elevators out of service for several weeks in 2018. There were reports that 35 apartments had been damaged by the leaks, and at least one would-be buyer reneged due to that issue. Another complaint included high winds trapping residents inside an elevator. The wind allegedly also caused "creaking, banging and clicking noises"—which, according to structural engineers, was a commonplace issue among multiple supertall skyscrapers. A study commissioned by a group of residents found 73 percent of mechanical, plumbing, or electrical infrastructure in the building was not built to plans. Residents also took issue with the high annual costs of the private restaurant service (which rose from $1,200 per household in 2015 to $15,000 in 2020) as well as the 300 percent increase in insurance costs during a two-year period. In response, Lendlease said they had contacted CIM and Macklowe about the issues. The complaints depressed demand for apartments at 432 Park Avenue compared with other luxury buildings, Although 432 Park Avenue had 11 vacant units at the beginning of 2021, only one of these was sold by that September, while existing residents placed their apartments for sale.

Toward the end of 2021, a new condo board was appointed. The board sued CIM Group and Macklowe Properties in September 2021 over allegations of design defects. An engineer hired by the board discovered an alleged 1,500 flaws. The lawsuit listed various complaints regarding vibrations, noise, leaking, and flooding. Among the complaints was that garbage tossed down the trash chute from higher floors "sounds like a bomb" on impact and that an engineer once accidentally cut off power and air-conditioning while trying to fix a leak. Prior to Labor Day in 2021, the entire building had to be vacated for two days for extensive repairs to the building's electrical system. CIM filed its answer to the lawsuit that December, threatening to countersue over the "vastly exaggerated" complaints and describing them as commonplace issues among new developments. The lawsuit against CIM and Macklowe had grown to include four million pages of documents by early 2024. The New York City Department of Buildings also issued building-code violations to the developers after discovering issues with the facade.

CIM also sought to foreclose on Macklowe's units in the building in 2023 after Macklowe defaulted on a $46 million loan from CIM; that dispute was settled the next year. There were 18 apartments on sale by May 2024, including one that the sponsors had never managed to sell, although CIM and Macklowe ultimately found a buyer for the final unsold unit that July. Macklowe requested that CIM's lawsuit against him not go to trial, but a judge denied his request in November 2024. Several residents filed another lawsuit against Macklowe and CIM in April 2025, claiming that the building's facade had many cracks and that the developers had tried to conceal the structural defects. A New York Times article from that October stated that the roof damper had already undergone significant refurbishment and that the issues would cost $100 million to fix. Macklowe was ultimately forced to give up his condominiums in the building to CIM, though he tried to sell the units after losing ownership of them. Macklowe unsuccessfully attempted to indemnify the condo board, which would force it to pay his legal fees.

== Residents ==
As early as 2012, a dozen potential clients were described as being interested in occupying units at 432 Park, and by the next year, tenants had signed contracts for over a third of the units. The following year, that proportion had risen above 50%, with all of the tenants collectively paying an estimated $1 billion. By the end of 2015, close to 90 percent of the apartments had been sold, with almost half of those owned by a foreign citizen, "part of a global elite that collects residences like art." Many of the buyers were wealthy Chinese, though there were also numerous Brazilian and Russian clients. The German newspaper Der Spiegel estimated that the majority of the units would remain unoccupied for more than ten months a year. Many buyers concealed their identities by forming limited liability companies to buy the units, and some buyers placed their apartments for sale without ever having lived there. The journalist Katherine Clarke wrote that, in the mid-2010s, "it seemed that every billionaire on the planet wanted to take a look.

Notable residents have included Lewis A. Sanders, Bennett LeBow, Ye Jianming, David Chu, Hely Nahmad, Jennifer Lopez, and Alex Rodriguez. Other wealthy residents have included diplomat Jamie McCourt, designer Jacob Arabo, Bridgewater Associates executive Bob Prince, and Douglas Elliman owner Howard Lorber. One buyer, hedge fund executive Mitch Julis, had the Japanese architect Hiroshi Sugimoto design a garden with Bonsai trees for his apartment.

=== Apartment selling prices ===
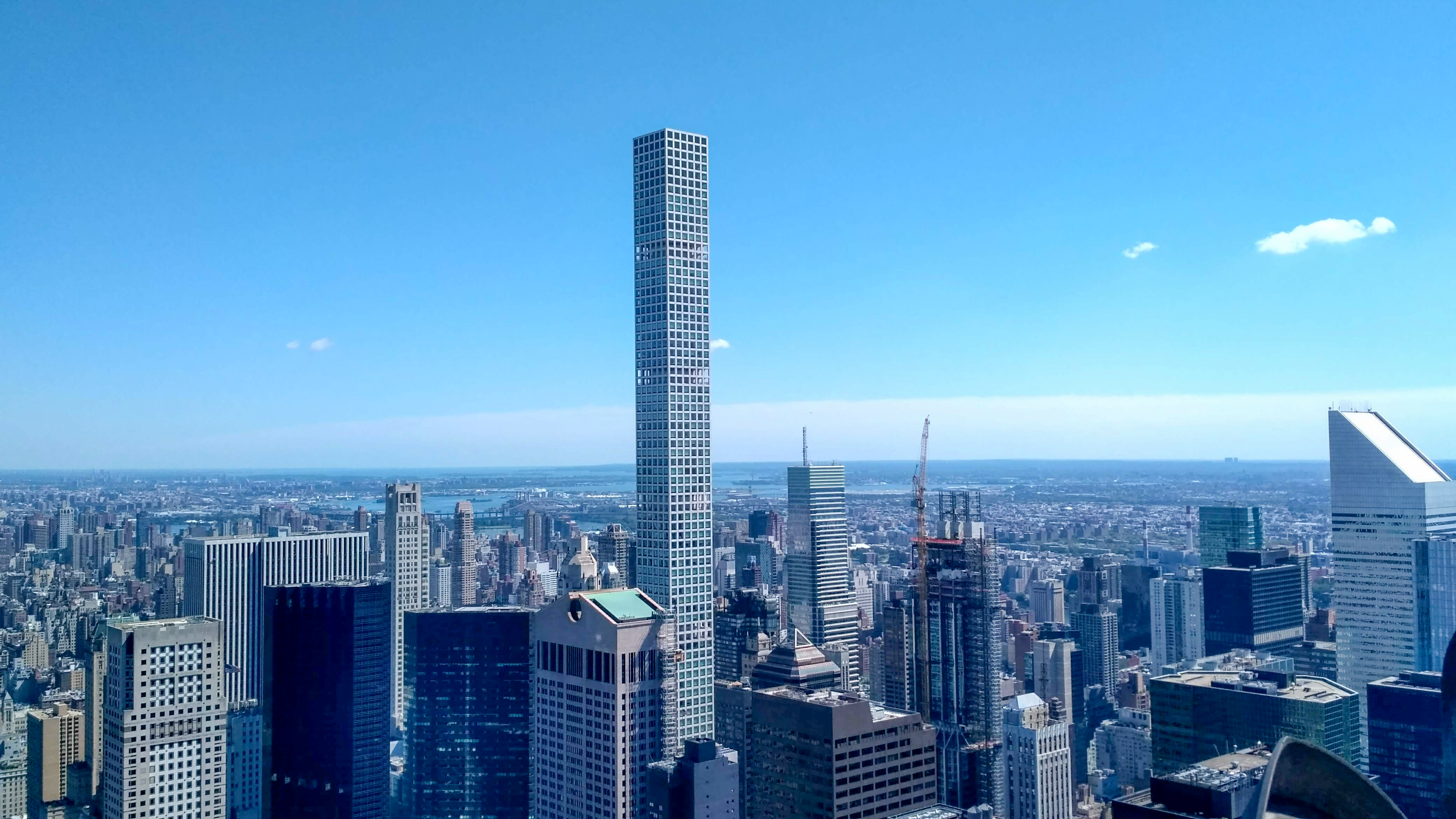
Seen from 30 Rockefeller Plaza

In 2016, 81 of the 104 units had been sold at a median price of $18.4 million; by the following year, the remaining unsold units were put for sale at prices between $6.5 and $82 million. The first sale to be completed was that of apartment #35B, which was reported in January 2016 for $18.116 million, more than the $17.75 million asking price. Ten additional apartments were available at that time, ranging from $17.4 to $44.25 million.

The median higher-floor units were more expensive than the other units. Two units on floor 91 were sold for $60 million in 2018 to Caryl Schechter, the wife of hedge-fund manager Israel Englander, while three units on floors 92 and 93 were sold in 2017 for a combined $91 million. The 94th-floor unit was sold for $32.4 million in 2019, about 25 percent lower than the original asking price. The 95th-floor unit, originally listed for $82 million, was split in half in 2018 and the individual units were sold at $30 million. The highest unit, on floor 96, was listed at $95 million but actually sold to Saudi businessman Fawaz Alhokair for $88 million in 2016.

The sale of all of the units was expected to bring in a total of $3.1 billion, the highest aggregate sales price of any building in New York City. After the condominium board's 2021 lawsuit, some units were placed for sale at substantial discounts. For example, Alhokair had placed his apartment for sale in June 2021 with an asking price of $169 million, before the issues were publicized; he had reduced his asking price to $105 million by May 2024. Conversely, one unit sold for $70 million in 2022, after the structural issues had been announced. An August 2025 analysis by The Real Deal found that 10 of the 13 original owners who had resold their apartments in 2017 and 2018 (before the structural issues were reported) had done so at a profit. Conversely, 10 of the 16 owners who had resold their apartments between 2021 and 2025 (after the issues were reported) had taken a loss.

== Reception and impact ==
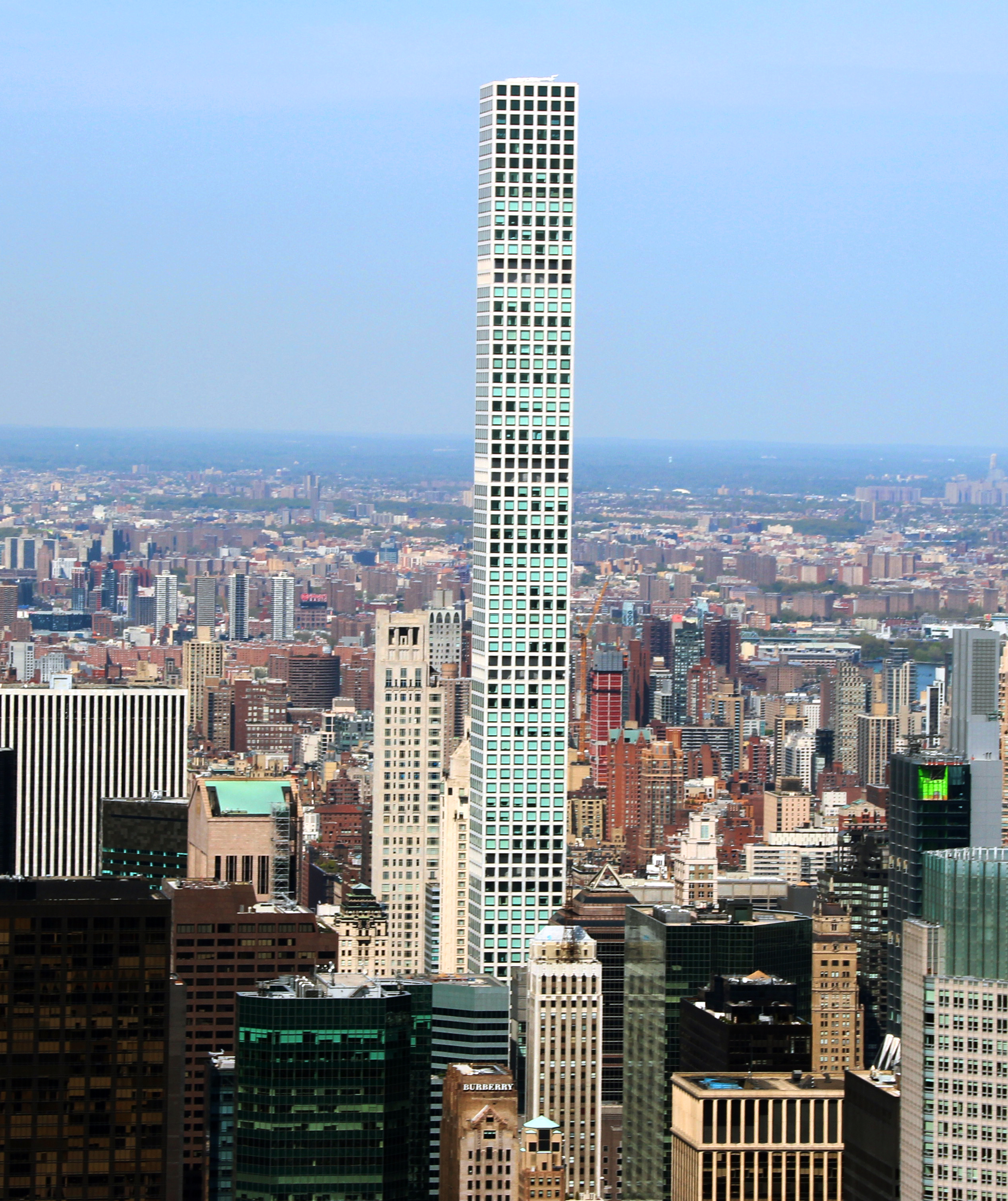
Seen in 2021 from the Empire State Building

The skyscraper has received mixed reviews from both professionals and the public. Robert A. M. Stern and the coauthors of his book New York 2020 wrote that the building was more positively received than the older One57, even as commentators disagreed whether it fit the skyline. Because 432 Park Avenue could be seen from so many places in New York City, observers also commented on its omnipresence. Its presence inspired an Instagram account that "appeared to stalk New Yorkers around the city", as Clarke described it.

Paul Goldberger of Vanity Fair magazine said the building's "sophisticated" exterior design reminded him of the work of Tadao Ando. Jonathan Margolis of the Financial Times said he was "obsessed by the almost childlike simplicity of 432 Park Ave", and Aaron Betsky of Architect magazine called 432 Park "a gridded tube abstracting and punctuating the more leaden masses of the lesser boxes around it". Bill Millard of Oculus magazine and James Gardner of The Real Deal praised the building's regular geometry while acknowledging its overpowering scale. Skyscraper Museum founder Carol Willis was optimistic that several Billionaires' Row buildings would become New York City designated landmarks in the 2050s, saying: "I have no doubt that some—such as 432 Park Avenue and 111 W 57 Street—will be designated as superior examples of the iconic forms characteristic of New York of the 2010s."

The architecture critic for New York magazine, Justin Davidson, wrote that the building is nothing more than "stacked cubbyhole units" and questioned the creative value of the building. The writer Ralph Gardner Jr. regarded the building's size as overwhelming to the point of disrespect, and another critic, James S. Russell,, said the window designs clashed with the building's slenderness. The fashion consultant Tim Gunn described the building as "just a thin column. It needs a little cap." Martin Filler of The New York Review of Books questioned the necessity of the building's omnipresence and likened it to a three-dimensional balance sheet.

Some critics have cited 432 Park Avenue as a representation of New York's increasing cost of living and ostentatious wealth. A critic for the Los Angeles Times called the skyscraper an "architectural emblem of rising inequality", while New York magazine called the building's units "fancy prisons for billionaires". Bianca Bosker wrote for The Atlantic magazine that some New Yorkers had given 432 Park the nickname of "Awful Waffle", saying that New York City's supertall buildings were "an eyesore" at best and a symbol of wealth inequality at worst. 432 Park's association to wealth inequality was also remarked upon by the building's own architect, Viñoly, who commented that "There are only two markets, ultraluxury and subsidized housing." Several residents of nearby buildings said that the influx of rich residents at 432 Park Avenue would increase the worth of their own properties.

== See also ==
- List of tallest buildings in New York City
- List of tallest buildings in the United States
- List of tallest residential buildings
