= Princess Tower =

Residential skyscraper in Dubai, UAE

Coordinates: 25°05′19″N 55°08′49″E

- Interactive map of the Princess Tower area

General information
- Status: Completed
- Architectural style: Postmodern
- Construction started: 25 February 2006
- Opening: 9 September 2012; 13 years ago

Height
- Architectural: 413.4 m (1,356 ft)
- Antenna spire: 414 m (1,358 ft)
- Roof: 392 m (1,286 ft)
- Top floor: 356.9 m (1,171 ft)

Technical details
- Floor count: 101, plus 6 basement floors
- Floor area: 171,175 m^{2} (1,842,512 sq ft)
- Lifts/elevators: 13

Design and construction
- Architect: Eng. Adnan Saffarini Office
- Developer: Tameer Holding Investment LLC
- Main contractor: Arabian Construction Company (ACC)

Other information
- Parking: 957

The Princess Tower (Arabic: برج الأميرة) is a 101 - storey , 413.4 m (1,356 ft) tall residential-only skyscraper located in the Marina district of Dubai, UAE. As of September 2022, Princess Tower is the third tallest building in Dubai, after the Burj Khalifa and Marina 101 and the 36th tallest building in the world. Princess Tower was the tallest residential building in the world from 2012 to 2015, when it was overtaken by 432 Park Avenue in New York City.

== Overview ==
The tower's engineering was performed by Syed Majid Hashmi as the Chief Structural Engineer and his deputy manager Mohammad Ali Alogaily.

The building comprises 763 units, 957 underground parking bays (spread over six floors), and eight retail outlets. The building was completed and delivered by its developer, Tameer Holdings, in September 2012.

The development stands at 107 stories and includes basement floors, a ground floor and 100 levels above ground. The tallest Princess Tower, which consists of standing at 414 metres, 23 Marina (395 metres), Elite Residence (380.5 metres), Almas Tower (363 metres) and the two JW Marriott Marquis towers (355 metres).

The development also features an indoor swimming pool, outdoor swimming pool, fully functioning gymnasium, sauna, steam room, exercise studio, multiple games rooms, children's play area, banqueting hall and an Observation Deck on the 97th floor with Wifi access.

== Construction gallery ==
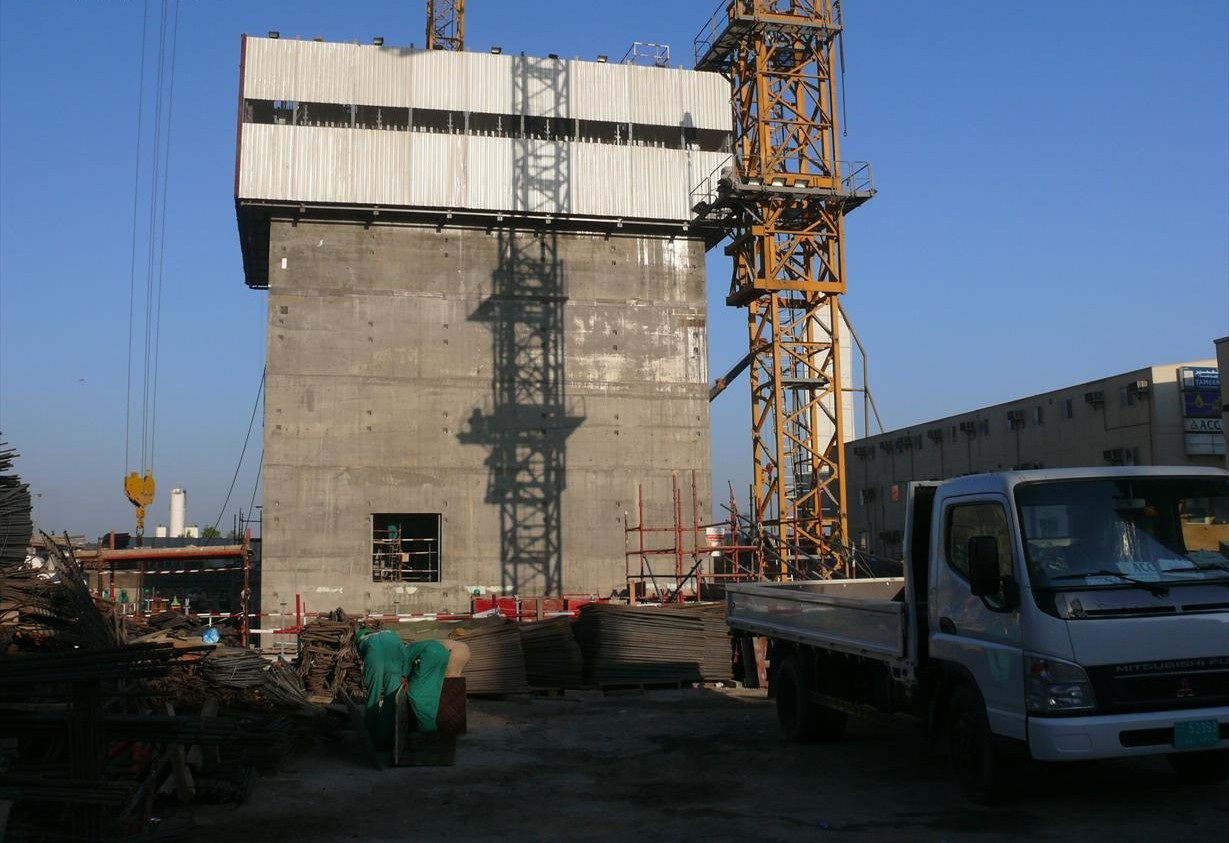
9 November 2007

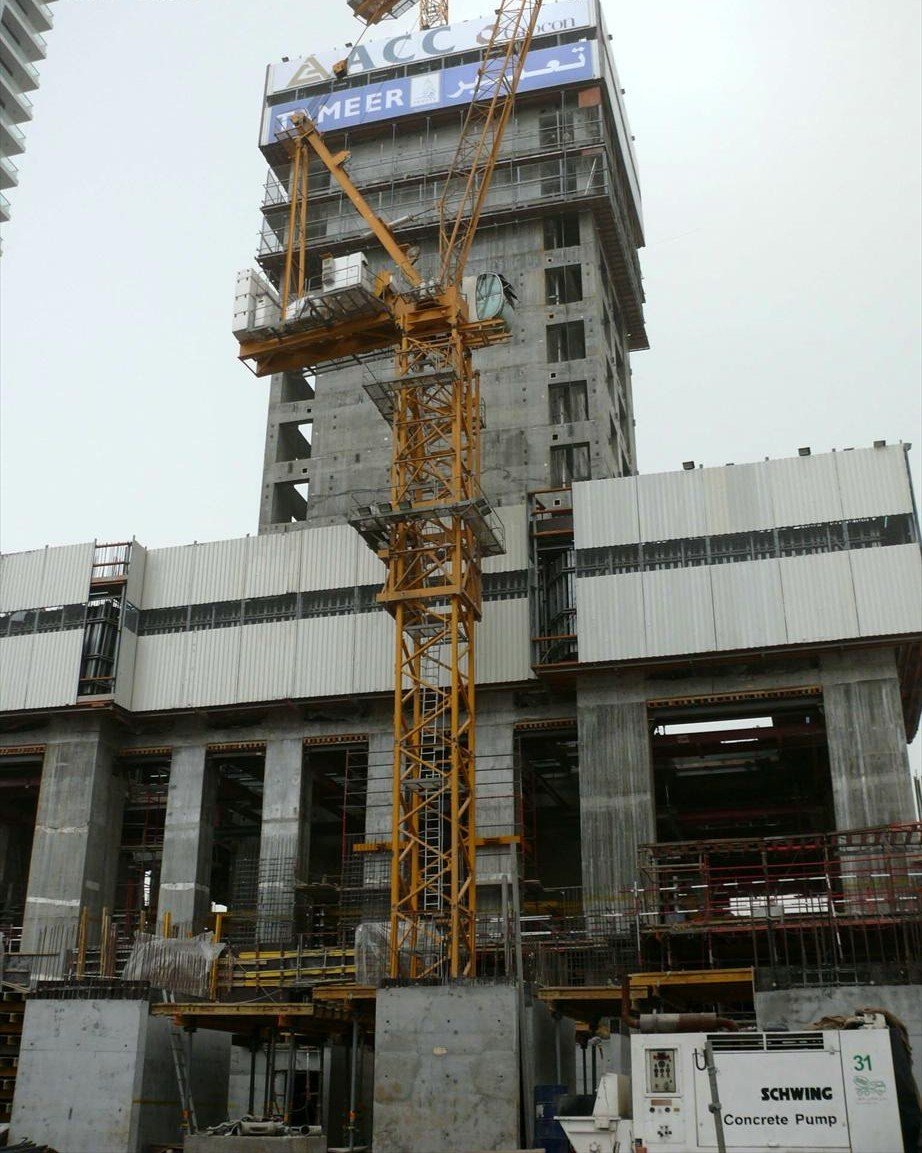
1 February 2008

== Gallery ==
View from the street

View amidst other towers in the Marina District

Outdoor pools and sunbathing area for residents

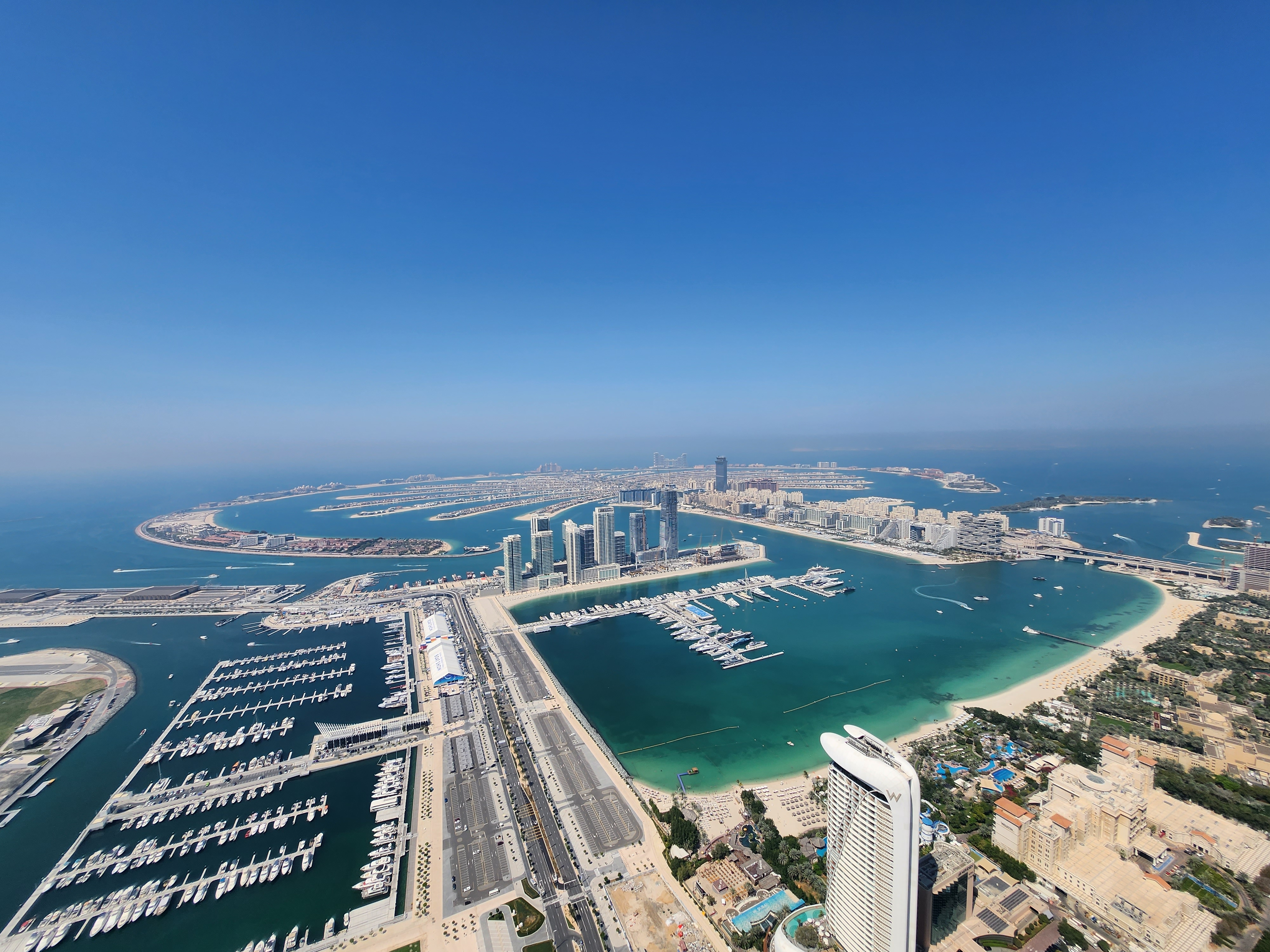
View from 90th floor: Palm Jumeirah

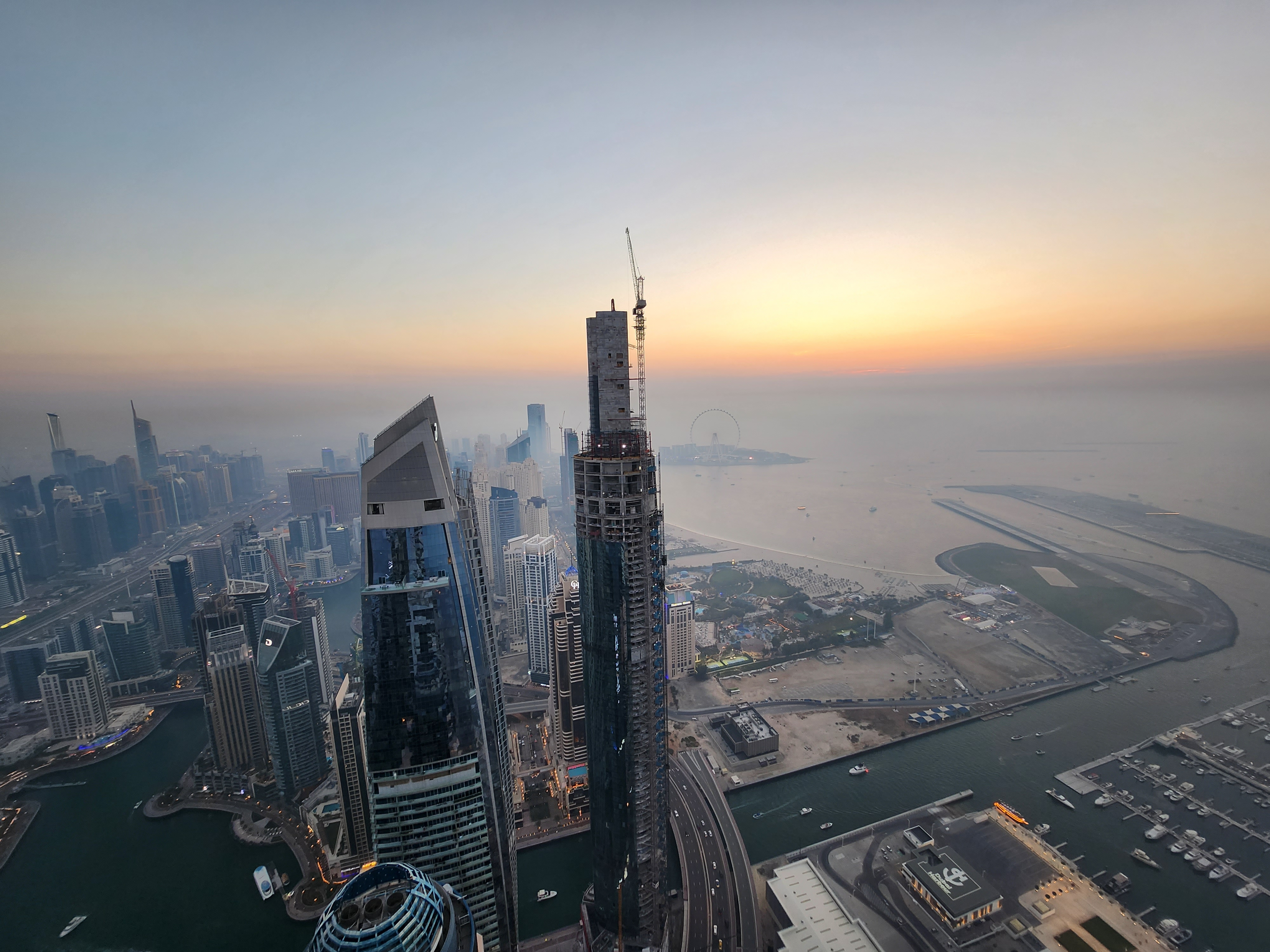
View from 90th floor: JBR and Ain Dubai

== See also ==
- List of tallest buildings in Dubai
- List of buildings with 100 floors or more
- List of tallest buildings in the United Arab Emirates
- List of tallest residential buildings in the world
- World One
