= Billionaires' Row =

Skyscraper group in New York City

- Development
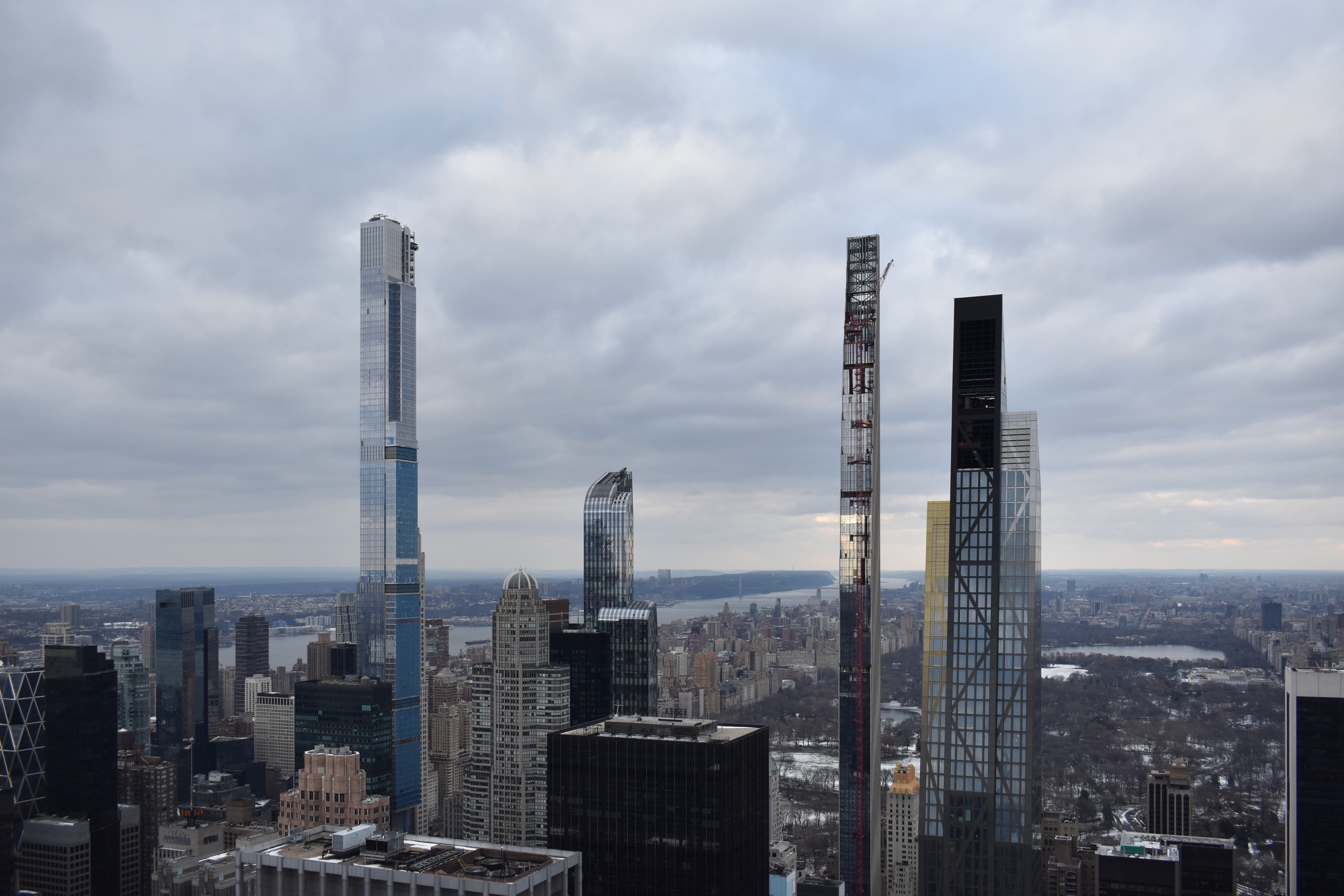
- Part of Billionaires' Row and Central Park (background)
- Interactive map of Billionaires' Row
- Coordinates: 40.7644°N 73.9772°W
- Country: United States
- State: New York
- City: New York City
- Borough: Manhattan

Billionaires' Row is a group of ultra-luxury residential skyscrapers, and the neighborhood surrounding them, near the southern end of Central Park in the Midtown section of Manhattan in New York City. Several of these buildings are in the supertall category—taller than 1,000 feet (300 m)—and, as of 2024, include the world's three tallest residential buildings. Since several of these pencil towers are on or near 57th Street, the term can refer to this street as well.

== Context ==
The neighborhood has some of the most expensive residences in the world. The top two floors of One57 sold to Michael Dell for $100.47 million in 2015, setting a record for the most expensive apartment ever sold in New York. Another bi-level apartment in the building was bought by hedge fund manager Bill Ackman for $91.5 million. The top penthouse at 432 Park Avenue went to Saudi retail magnate Fawaz Al Hokair for $87.7 million, and hedge fund manager Kenneth C. Griffin is said to have bought four floors at 220 Central Park South for $238 million, breaking One57's record for the most expensive home sold in New York City and setting a new record for the most expensive home sold in the United States. Also at 220 Central Park South, several units were combined into a four-story mansion costing $250 million. These projects have highlighted the controversial economic conditions and zoning policies that have encouraged these buildings, and concerns have been raised about their effects have on the surrounding neighborhoods and the shadows they cast on Central Park. NYC regulates building size based on floor area ratio (FAR), which treats thin, tall buildings the same as short, wide buildings. 57th Street has a high concentration of parcels with an relatively high allowed FAR of 15.

As of August 2021, an estimated 44% of units in seven buildings considered part of Billionaires' Row still hadn't been sold.

One of the factors underlying the boom is foreign investment, often in the form of capital flight. Some of these buyers have poured money into high-end New York real estate to dodge taxes, launder money or transfer wealth to a jurisdiction where it is less easily forfeited. Many of the apartments are only sporadically occupied, functioning as pied-à-terres or "safe deposit boxes" for valuables.

The ultra-luxury building boom in the area predates the term "Billionaires' Row". Deutsche Bank Center, built in 2003, is at the southwest corner of Central Park. A majority of its tenants bought their condos anonymously (through shell companies and trusts); at least 17 of these have been identified as billionaires. 15 Central Park West, two blocks east, contains units that have been purchased by billionaires Sara Blakely, Lloyd Blankfein, Omid Kordestani, Daniel Loeb, Daniel Och, Eyal Ofer, Pan Shiyi, Sandy Weill, Jerry Yang and Zhang Xin. Before the sale of the $100 million penthouse at One57, the record for an apartment in New York was $88 million paid by Dmitry Rybolovlev for a penthouse at 15 Central Park West.

In 2016, the United States Treasury Department announced it would start identifying and tracking the purchase of multi-million-dollar units, especially those paid for in cash or via shell companies, to cut down on the practice of money laundering. New laws in China restricting capital outflow have also been implemented, and lower oil prices have affected potential Middle Eastern buyers. Uncertainty over Brexit has also played a role. This has weakened the market for the highest-end units, with some declaring that the "Eight Digit Boom" on Billionaires' Row has ended. In the face of this soft market, at least one project in the area (1 Park Lane) has been put on hold.

== Buildings ==
The first supertall building to be built in the neighborhood was One57, a 1,004-foot (306 m) apartment building between Sixth and Seventh Avenues completed in 2014. By then, several other even-taller skyscrapers were proposed or under construction along the stretch of 57th Street roughly corresponding to the southern edge of Central Park. Due to the often record-breaking prices that have been set for the apartments in these buildings, the press dubbed this section of 57th Street "Billionaires' Row". The term has since been extended to other supertall luxury buildings facing southern Central Park not strictly on 57th Street.

Projects (planned, underway, or complete) that have been listed as part of Billionaires' Row include:

Building name (street address)	Developer	Architect	Construction started	Completed date	Architectural height	Image
One57 (157 West 57th Street)	Extell Development Company	Christian de Portzamparc	2009	2014	1,005 feet (306 m)	
432 Park Avenue	CIM Group and Harry B. Macklowe	Rafael Viñoly	2011	2015	1,397 feet (426 m)	
252 East 57th Street	World Wide Group and Rose Associates, Inc.	Roger Duffy of Skidmore, Owings & Merrill	2013	2016	712 feet (217 m)	
111 West 57th Street	JDS Development Group and Property Markets Group	SHoP Architects	2014	2021	1,438 feet (438 m)	
Central Park Tower (225 West 57th Street)	Extell Development Company and Shanghai Municipal Investment Group	Adrian Smith + Gordon Gill Architecture	2014	2021	1,550 feet (470 m)	
220 Central Park South	Vornado Realty Trust	Robert A.M. Stern Architects	2015	2019	952 feet (290 m)	
53W53 (53 West 53rd Street)	Pontiac Land Group and Hines	Jean Nouvel	2014	2019	1,050 feet (320 m)	
520 Park Avenue	Zeckendorf Development	Robert A.M. Stern Architects	2015	2018	781 feet (238 m)	

== See also ==
- The Bishops Avenue, a street in London known as "Billionaires' Row"
- Millionaires' Mile
