= East Pacific Center =

Skyscraper complex in Shenzhen, Guangdong, China

- 东海商务广场
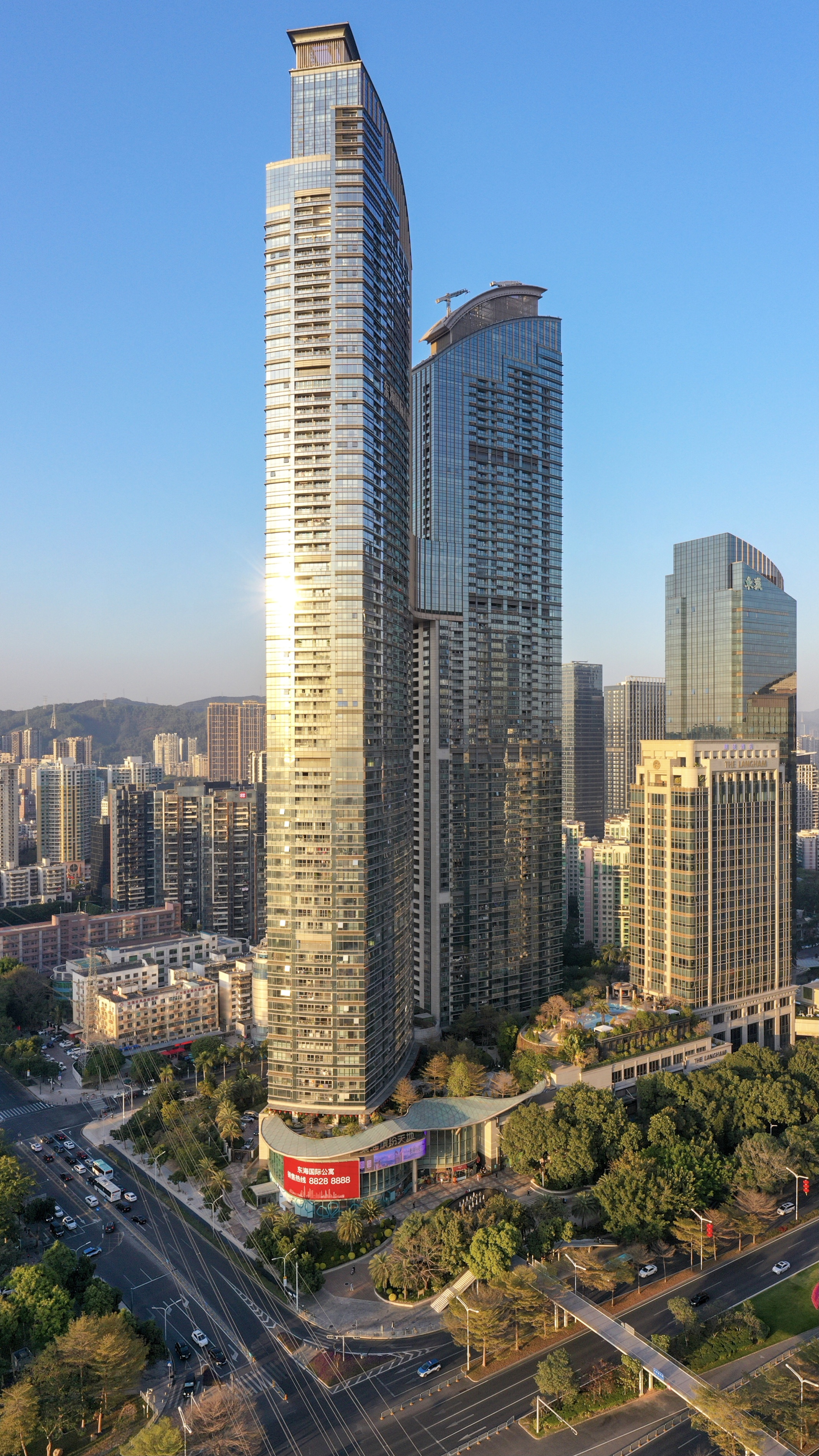
- East Pacific Center in February 2021
- Interactive map of the East Pacific Center area

General information
- Status: Completed
- Type: A & B. Residential; C & D. Office
- Architectural style: Modern
- Location: 7888 Shennan Boulevard, Futian District, Shenzhen, Guangdong, China
- Coordinates: 22°32′18″N 114°0′51″E
- Construction started: A & B. March 4, 2008; C & D. November 29, 2007
- Opening: A & B. December 5, 2013; C & D. 2010

Height
- Architectural: A. 306 m (1,004 ft); B. 261 m (856 ft); C. 206 m (676 ft); D. 155 m (509 ft)
- Tip: A. 306 m (1,004 ft)
- Top floor: A. 278 m (912 ft)

Technical details
- Floor count: A. 85; B. 72; C. 40; D. 29
- Floor area: 360,000 m^{2} (3,875,008 sq ft)

Design and construction
- Architecture firm: Wong & Ouyang
- Developer: Shenzhen East Pacific Group
- Structural engineer: Arup Group
- Main contractor: China Construction Second Building Group

The East Pacific Center (Chinese: 东海商务广场, Chinese: 東海商務廣場) is a skyscraper complex in Shenzhen, China. The complex consists of four buildings:

- East Pacific Center Tower A is 306 m (1,004 ft) tall with 85 storeys.
- East Pacific Center Tower B is 261 m (856 ft) tall with 72 storeys.
- East Pacific Center Tower C is 206 m (676 ft) tall with 40 storeys.
- East Pacific Center Tower D is 155 m (509 ft) tall with 29 storeys.

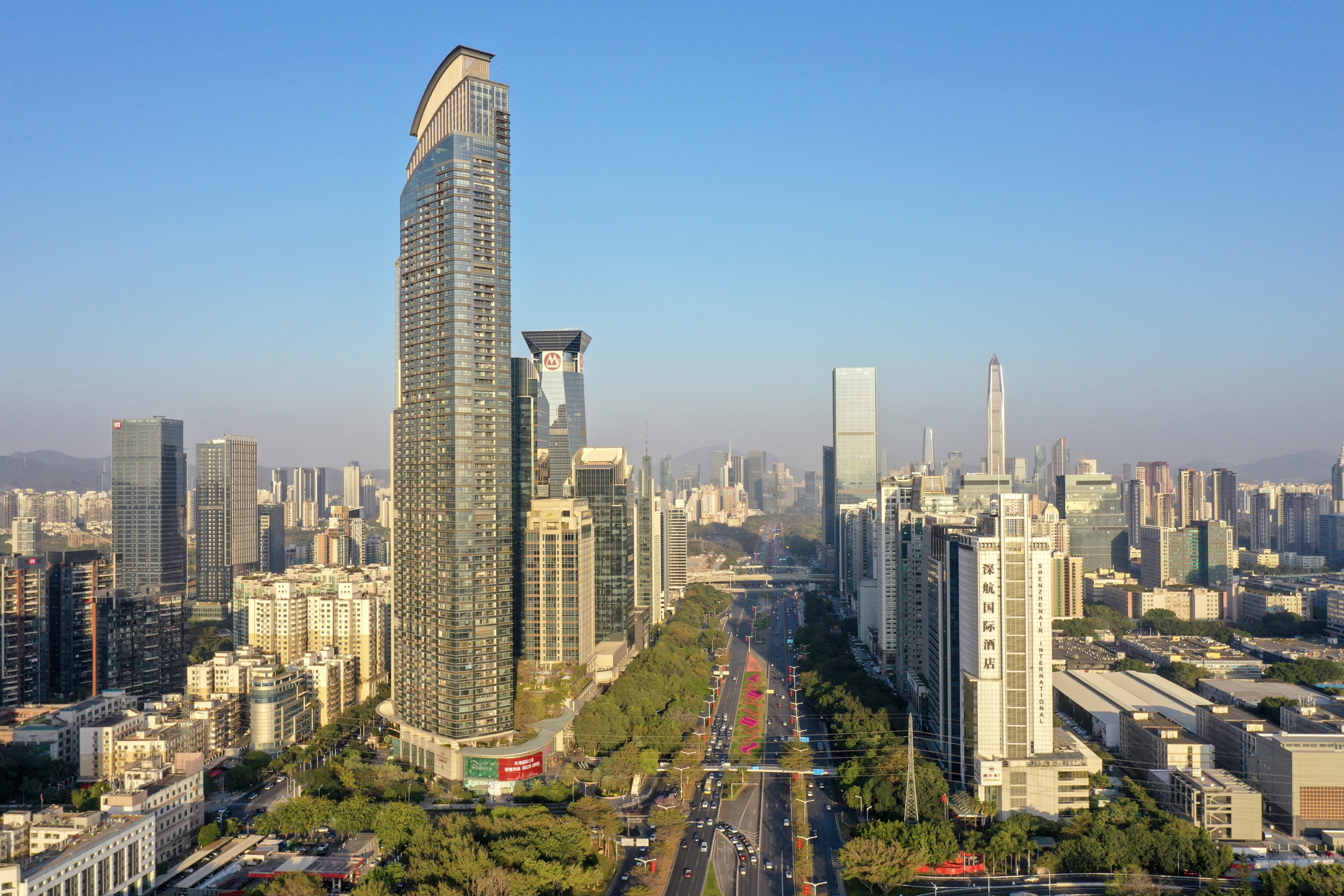
the view of the East Pacific Center alongside Shennan Boulevard

Towers A and B are for residential use and are joined by a sky bridge. They were topped out in late 2012 and completed in 2013. Towers C and D are office blocks and were completed in 2010.

As of 2022, Tower A was the tallest residential building in China.

== See also ==
- List of tallest buildings in Shenzhen
- List of tallest buildings in China
- List of tallest residential buildings in the world
