= SLCE Architects =

Architecture firm

- Founded: New York City, New York, United States
- Services: Architecture, Interior Design, Sustainable Design, Urban Design, Planning
- Number of employees: 150
- Website: www.slcearch.com

SLCE Architects is an American architecture firm which provides architectural services in both the public and private sector. Between 2010 and 2015, the firm received the most commissions for residential developments in New York City. The firm is best known for being the architect of record on many of the projects it is involved in.

The firm was founded in 1941 as Schuman Lichtenstein Architects, a partnership between Bell Telephone Company draftsmen Sidney Schuman and Samuel Lichtenstein. In 1952, Peter Claman was hired as a draftsman; he subsequently became a partner. The firm promoted Al Efron as a partner in 1970 and promoted Jerold Clark and Enzo DePol as partners in 1984.

== Projects ==
Buildings designed by SLCE or on which it has served as the architect of record include Jewelers Row Tower, 220 Central Park South (with Robert A.M. Stern Architects), 252 East 57th Street, and 712 Fifth Avenue (with Kohn Pedersen Fox).
