= Jewelers Row Tower =

Coordinates: 39.9485°N 75.1525°W

- Interactive map of the Jewelers Row Tower area

General information
- Status: Proposed
- Type: Residential
- Location: Washington Square West

Technical details
- Floor count: 29

Design and construction
- Architect: SLCE Architects
- Developer: Toll Brothers

Jewelers Row Tower is a 29-story residential building planned for the Washington Square West neighborhood of Philadelphia on the southeast corner of Sansom Street and south Seventh Street. It is being developed by Toll Brothers and designed by SLCE Architects. The plans for the project have proved controversial, and have been criticized by parties including Philadelphia mayor Jim Kenney and architectural critic Inga Saffron.

== Design ==
The building was designed by SLCE Architects. The proposed design has two facades: one that is primarily brick, in keeping with adjacent buildings, and the other side, which is a glass curtain wall.
