= Pied-à-terre =

Small secondary residence used for work

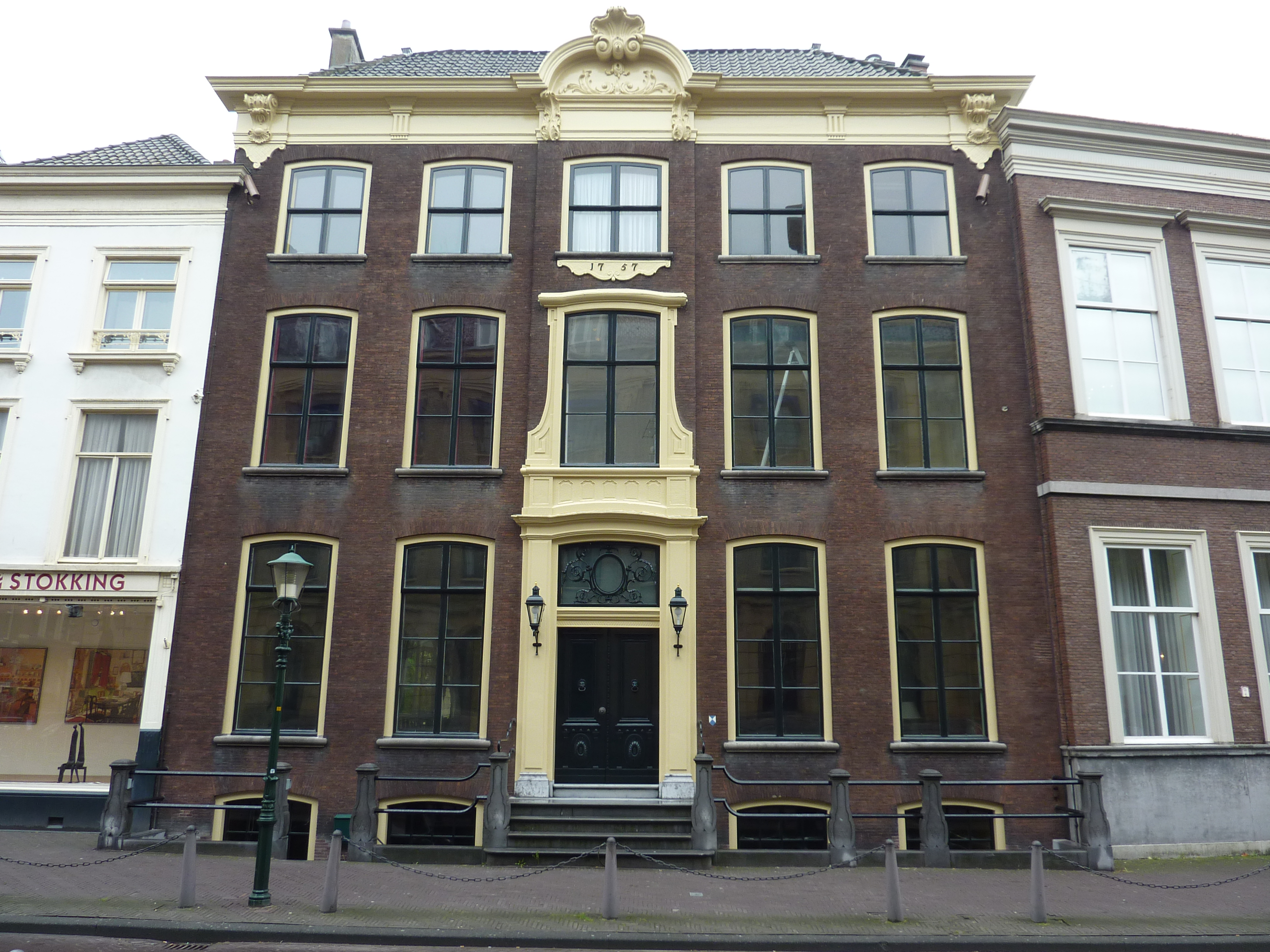
Noordeinde 66, the pied-à-terre of Princess Beatrix in The Hague

A pied-à-terre (French pronunciation: [pjet‿a tɛʁ]; plural: pieds-à-terre; French for "foot/feet on the ground") is a living unit, e.g., apartment or condominium, often located in a large city and not used as an individual's primary residence. The term implies use of the property as a temporary second residence, but not a holiday home, either for part of the year or part of the work week, usually by a rather wealthy person. If the owner's primary residence is nearby, the term also implies that the residence allows the owner to use their primary residence as a vacation home.

Pieds-à-terre attracted discussion during the 2010s in Paris and New York, where they are argued to cause a reduction in the overall housing supply. A tax on such units has been discussed since 2014.

== Legislation of pieds-à-terre ==
=== New York ===
In 2014, The New York Times reported 57% of units on one three-block stretch of midtown Manhattan were vacant over half of the year. Many of the buildings mentioned border Central Park and have become known as Billionaires' Row. New York state senator Liz Krueger, whose district includes Midtown, stated:

My district has some of the most expensive land values in the world—I'm ground zero for the issue of foreign buyers. I met with a developer who is building one of those billionaire buildings on 57th Street and he told me, "Don't worry, you won't need any more services, because the buyers won't be sending their kids to school here, there won't be traffic."

A 2019 bill in the New York State Assembly that would place a recurring tax on luxury pieds-à-terre was blocked after intense pressure from real estate developers and their lobbyists.

On Tax Day in 2026, New York State Governor Kathy Hochul and New York City Mayor Zohran Mamdani proposed a New York City pied-à-terre tax on second homes worth over $5 million, projected to bring in more than $500 million annually. On May 27, 2026, the New York State Legislature approved the tax, which took effect on July 1, 2026. How much the city will ultimately be able to collect in revenue is a matter of dispute. On September 29, 2026, judge Wayne M. Ozzi of the State Supreme Court on Staten Island ruled that the city must scrap and restart the process of determining which properties are subject to the tax. On November 4, 2026, the New York Supreme Court, Appellate Division overruled on appeal on the grounds that the plaintiffs lacked standing, clearing the way for the tax to proceed.

Many cooperative buildings in New York City have restrictions on pied-à-terre purchasers or occupancy in their co-op bylaws.

=== France ===
In the Parisian real estate market, mini-apartments measuring a few square metres, often less than 8 m^{2} (86 sq ft), are sold or rented to people who work or study in Paris during the week but live elsewhere. As of 2010, French cities with more than 200,000 inhabitants have a minimum one-year lease for apartments in order to crack down on pieds-à-terre that are offered as short-term rentals.

=== Netherlands ===
In Amsterdam, a house must be above a certain rental value to be classified as a pied-à-terre. If the owner of such a house lets their children live in it, then all children should be registered in that municipality. In addition to students, politicians and many television personalities own pieds-à-terre in Amsterdam while they live elsewhere.

Many ministers and deputies own pieds-à-terre in The Hague while remaining registered in their own municipality.

== See also ==
- Maisonette
- Commuting
