= List of tallest residential buildings =

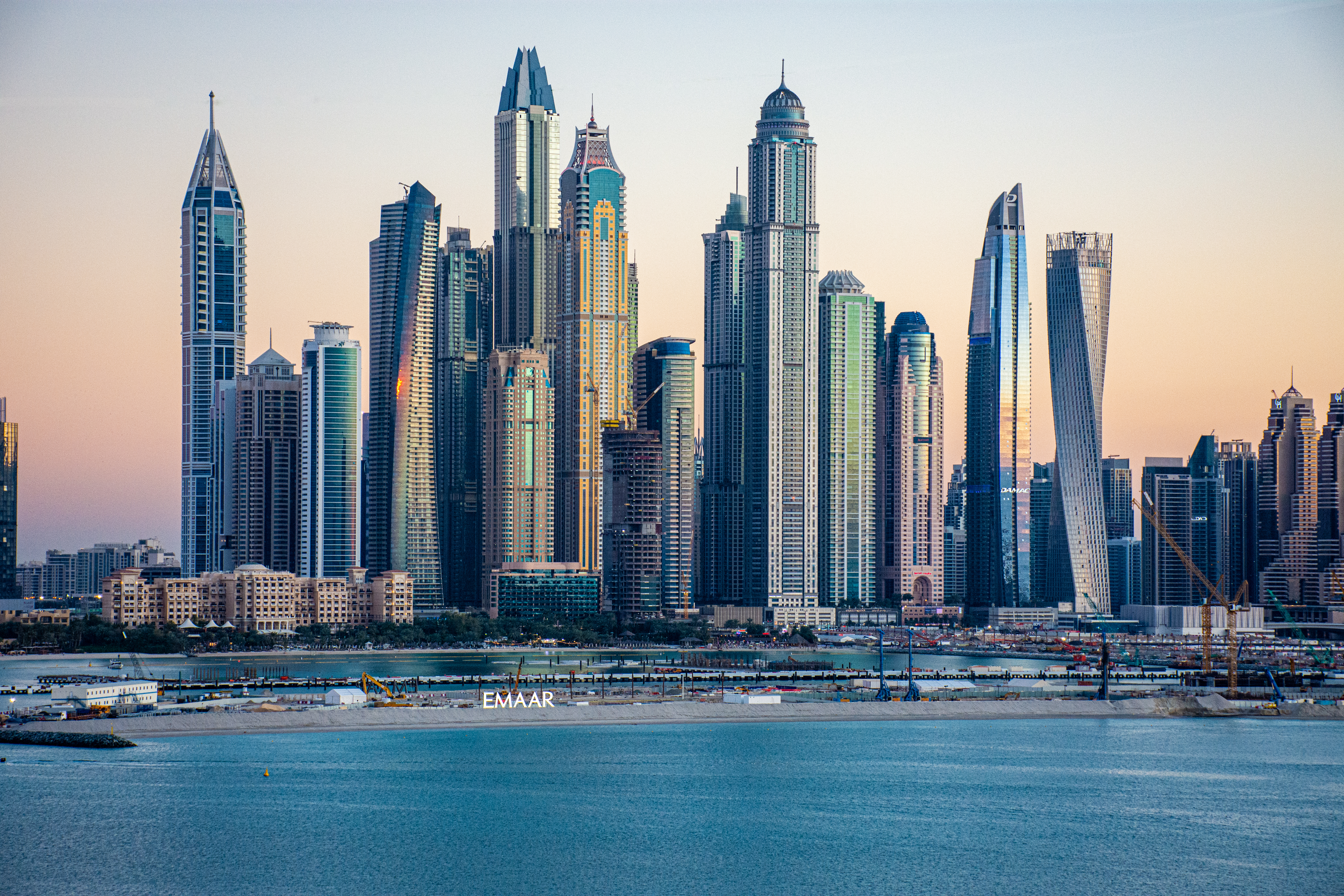
The Dubai Marina in Dubai, also known as the "tallest block in the world", is home to five of the ten tallest residential buildings in the world.

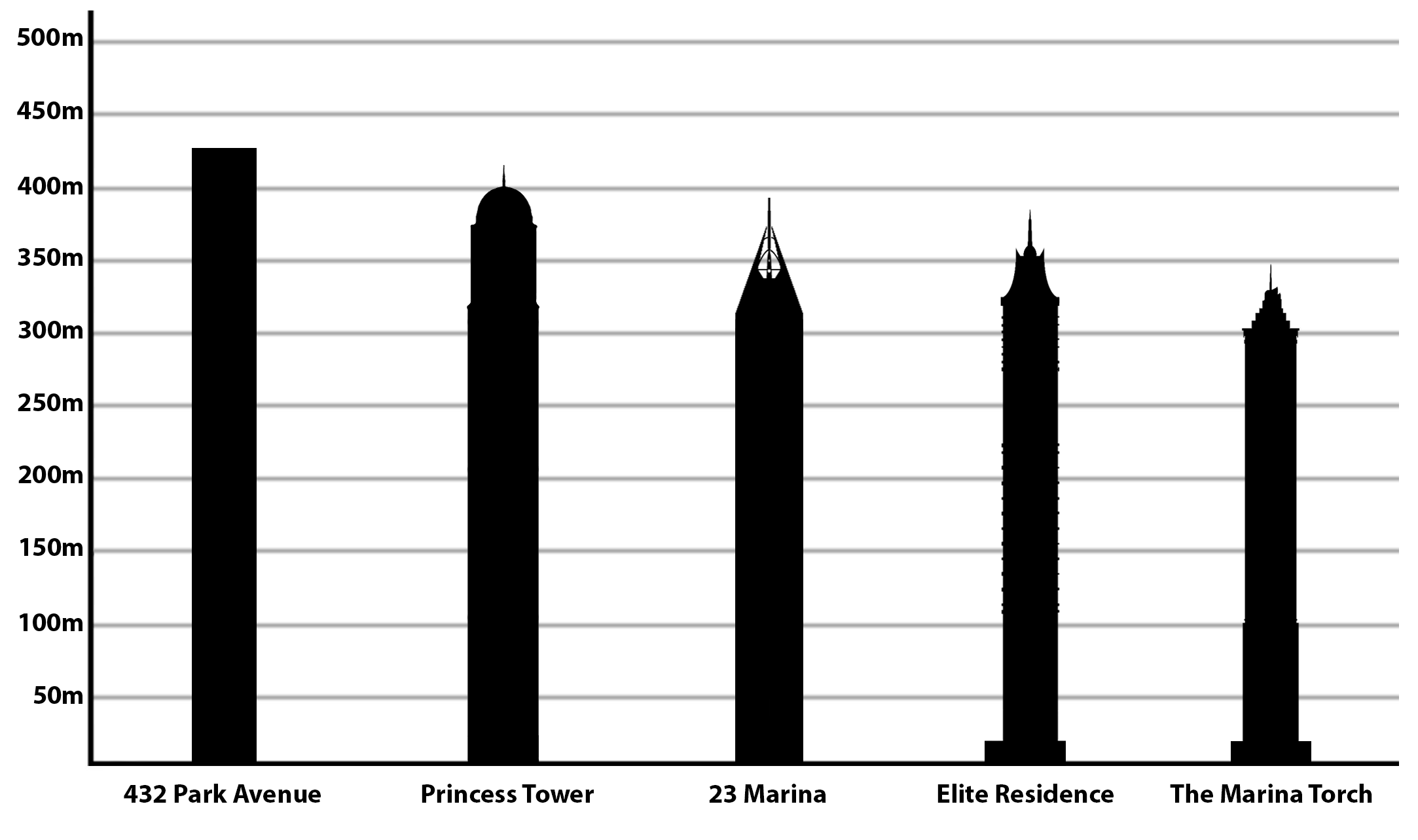
Tallest residential buildings in the world in 2015

The Council on Tall Buildings and Urban Habitat (CTBUH) defines a residential building as one where 85 percent or more of its total floor area is dedicated to residential usage.

Currently, the tallest residential building in the world is Central Park Tower in a part of Midtown Manhattan, New York City, colloquially referred to as "Billionaires' Row". It was topped out at a height of 472.4 metres (1,550 ft) in 2019.

As of 2025, New York City is also home to all top three tallest residential buildings in the world, while Dubai in the United Arab Emirates has six of the ten tallest.

== History and ranking criteria ==
Since 2000, when CTBUH started maintaining a list of tallest residential buildings, The Belcher's Tower 1 and The Belcher's Tower 2 located in Hong Kong were the first tallest residential buildings whose heights equal 221 metres (725 ft) and were completed in 2000.

In 2001, Trump World Tower in New York City became the tallest residential building in the world, until it was surpassed in 2003 by the 21st Century Tower followed by the Q1 on the Gold Coast in 2005. In 2012, Princess Tower in Dubai became the tallest residential building in the world, before being surpassed by 432 Park Avenue in New York City in 2014. The current tallest residential building, Central Park Tower, was topped out during September 2019 and completed in 2020.

The percentage of residential buildings whose height exceeds 200 metres increased from 34 percent in 2009 to 45 percent in 2010, making Burj Khalifa the world's first megatall building to include residential space.

The CTBUH insist that a building should only be added to the official tallest list when it is (i) topped out structurally and architecturally, (ii) fully clad, and (iii) open for business, or at least partially open. This became the CTBUH official definition of a building's "completion".

== Tallest residential buildings ==
This list ranks residential buildings that stand at least 300 metres (980 ft) tall, based on standard height measurement. This includes spires and architectural details, but does not include antenna masts. An equal sign (=) following a rank indicates the same height between two or more buildings. The "Year" column indicates the year in which a building was completed.

Was the tallest residential building in upon completion
Indicates buildings still under construction that have been architecturally topped out but not yet fully opened

Rank	Name	Image	City	Country	Height metres / feet	Floors	Year	Notes
1	Central Park Tower		New York City	United States	472.4 metres (1,550 ft)	98	2020	Has been the tallest residential building in the world since 2020. Tallest pencil tower in the world.
2	111 West 57th Street		New York City	United States	435.3 metres (1,428 ft)	84	2021	Topped out in April 2019.
3	432 Park Avenue		New York City	United States	425.7 metres (1,397 ft)	85	2015	Was the tallest residential building in the world from 2015 to 2020.
4	Marina 101		Dubai	United Arab Emirates	425 metres (1,394 ft)	101	2017	
5	Princess Tower		Dubai	United Arab Emirates	413 metres (1,355 ft)	101	2012	
6	23 Marina		Dubai	United Arab Emirates	392 metres (1,286 ft)	89	2012	
7	Burj Mohammed Bin Rashid		Abu Dhabi	United Arab Emirates	381 metres (1,250 ft)	88	2014	
8	Elite Residence		Dubai	United Arab Emirates	381 metres (1,250 ft)	87	2012	
9	City Tower 1		Dubai	United Arab Emirates	363 metres (1,191 ft)	96	2026	
10	Il Primo Tower		Dubai	United Arab Emirates	356 metres (1,168 ft)	79	2023	
11	SkyTower at Pinnacle One Yonge		Toronto	Canada	353 metres (1,158 ft)	106	2027	
12	Marina Torch		Dubai	United Arab Emirates	352 metres (1,155 ft)	86	2011	
13	Al Habtoor Tower		Dubai	United Arab Emirates	345 metres (1,132 ft)	82	2026	
14	Neva Towers 2		Moscow	Russia	345 metres (1,132 ft)	79	2020	
15	Mercedes-Benz Places Binghatti		Dubai	United Arab Emirates	341 metres (1,119 ft)	71	2027	
16	Haeundae LCT The Sharp Tower A		Busan	South Korea	339.1 metres (1,113 ft)	85	2019	
17	DAMAC Residenze		Dubai	United Arab Emirates	335 metres (1,099 ft)	88	2018	
18	Haeundae LCT The Sharp Tower B		Busan	South Korea	333.1 metres (1,093 ft)	85	2019	
19	AMA Tower		Dubai	United Arab Emirates	333 metres (1,093 ft)	65	2021	
20	Regalia		Dubai	United Arab Emirates	331 metres (1,086 ft)	70	2026	
21	The Brooklyn Tower		New York City	United States	325 metres (1,066 ft)	74	2023	
22	Q1	Q1, in Gold Coast, Australia	Gold Coast	Australia	322.5 metres (1,058 ft)	80	2005	Was the tallest residential building in the world from 2005 to 2011
23	53W53		New York City	United States	320 metres (1,050 ft)	77	2019	
24	HHHR Tower		Dubai	United Arab Emirates	317 metres (1,040 ft)	72	2009	
25	Australia 108		Melbourne	Australia	316 metres (1,037 ft)	100	2020	
26	Magnolias Waterfront Residences		Bangkok	Thailand	315 metres (1,033 ft)	70	2018	
27	Waterline		Austin	United States	311.2 metres (1,021 ft)	74	2026	Construction completed.
28	Abu Dhabi Plaza		Astana	Kazakhstan	310.7 metres (1,019 ft)	75	2022	
29	Ocean Heights		Dubai	United Arab Emirates	310 metres (1,020 ft)	84	2010	
30	35 Hudson Yards		New York City	United States	308.8 metres (1,013 ft)	72	2019	
31	One Bloor West		Toronto	Canada	308.6 metres (1,012 ft)	85	2028	
32	Burj Rafal		Riyadh	Saudi Arabia	307.9 metres (1,010 ft)	68	2014	
33 =	Amna Tower		Dubai	United Arab Emirates	307 metres (1,007 ft)	75	2020	
33 =	Noora Tower		Dubai	United Arab Emirates	307 metres (1,007 ft)	75	2019	
35	Cayan Tower	One57 in New York City, United States.	Dubai	United Arab Emirates	306.4 metres (1,005 ft)	76	2013	
36 =	East Pacific Center Tower A	East Pacific Center Tower A in Shenzhen, China	Shenzhen	China	306 metres (1,004 ft)	85	2013	
36 =	One57	One57 in New York City, United States.	New York City	United States	306 metres (1,004 ft)	75	2014	
38	Etihad Tower 2		Abu Dhabi	United Arab Emirates	305.3 metres (1,002 ft)	80	2011	
39	Neva Towers 1		Moscow	Russia	302 metres (991 ft)	65	2020	
40	Capital City Moscow Tower		Moscow	Russia	301.8 metres (990 ft)	76	2010	
41	Lokhandwala Minerva		Mumbai	India	300.6 metres (986 ft)	78	2023	
42	We've the Zenith Tower A		Busan	South Korea	300 metres (980 ft)	80	2011	

== Under construction and on hold ==
=== Under construction ===
These buildings are under construction and are planned to be at least 300 metres (980 ft).

Rank	Name	City	Country	Height metres / feet	Floors	Year started	Year ends (est.)	Notes
1	Jeddah Tower	Jeddah	Saudi Arabia	1,008 metres (3,307 ft)	167	2013	2028	
2	Burj Azizi	Dubai	United Arab Emirates	725 metres (2,379 ft)	133	2025	2028	
3	Burj Binghatti Jacob & Co Residences	Dubai	United Arab Emirates	557 metres (1,827 ft)	105	2023	2027	
4	Senna Tower	Balneário Camboriú	Brazil	550 metres (1,800 ft)	154	2025	2030	
5	Tiger Sky Tower	Dubai	United Arab Emirates	532 metres (1,745 ft)	116	2024	2029	
6	Six Senses Residences Dubai Marina	Dubai	United Arab Emirates	517 metres (1,696 ft)	122	2008	2028	
7	Suzhou CSC Fortune Center	Suzhou	China	460 metres (1,510 ft)	100	2022	2028	
8	Aeternitas Tower	Dubai	United Arab Emirates	450 metres (1,480 ft)	106	2009	2027	
9	Hainan Center Tower 1	Haikou	China	428 metres (1,404 ft)	94	2015	2027	
10	Lucheng Square	Wenzhou	China	388.8 metres (1,276 ft)	79	2021	2028	
11	Downtown Baghdad tower	Baghdad	Iraq	380 metres (1,250 ft)	80	2024	2027	
12	One	Moscow	Russia	379 metres (1,243 ft)	90	2025	2030	
13	Bayz 101 Tower	Dubai	United Arab Emirates	363 metres (1,191 ft)	108	2024	2028	
14	Rixos Financial Center Road	Dubai	United Arab Emirates	348 metres (1,142 ft)	87	2024	2027	
15	SRG Tower	Dubai	United Arab Emirates	346 metres (1,135 ft)	90	2023	2028	
16	Safa Two de Grisogono	Dubai	United Arab Emirates	345 metres (1,132 ft)	85	2022	2027	
17	Dau House	Moscow	Russia	340 metres (1,120 ft)	87	2024	2028	
18	25h Heimat	Dubai	United Arab Emirates	326 metres (1,070 ft)	74	2024	2027	
19	Mr. C Residences Downtown	Dubai	United Arab Emirates	323 metres (1,060 ft)	72	2021	2026	
20	Waldorf Astoria Miami	Miami	United States	320 metres (1,050 ft)	100	2022	2027	
21	Aaradhya Avaan Tower 1	Mumbai	India	307 metres (1,007 ft)	80	2024	2028	
22	Cypress Palms Tower 1	Gold Coast	Australia	305 metres (1,001 ft)	90	2024	2027	
23	Concord Sky	Toronto	Canada	301 metres (988 ft)	86	2018	2027	

=== On hold ===
This list contains residential buildings that are at least 300 metres (980 ft) in height and their construction is currently on hold.

Name	City	Country	Height metres / feet	Floors	Construction originally started	Notes
Bengaluru Turf Tower	Bengaluru	India	660 metres (2,170 ft)	156	2016	
Burj Almasa	Jeddah	Saudi Arabia	432 metres (1,417 ft)	93	2011	
Nanjing Olympic Suning Tower	Nanjing	China	419.8 metres (1,377 ft)	99	2011	
Fairmont Kuala Lumpur Tower 1	Kuala Lumpur	Malaysia	370 metres (1,210 ft)	78	2014	
Ocean One Tower	Pattaya	Thailand	367 metres (1,204 ft)	91	2006	
45 Broad Street	New York City	United States	366 metres (1,201 ft)	68	2018	
SUNAC A-ONE Tower 4	Chongqing	China	349 metres (1,145 ft)	89	2020	
IBN Bukit Bintang	Kuala Lumpur	Malaysia	330 metres (1,080 ft)	68	2019	
The Stratford Residences	Makati	Philippines	312 metres (1,024 ft)	74	2011	
Dubai Pearl	Dubai	United Arab Emirates	300 metres (980 ft)	73	2009	

== Timeline of tallest residential buildings ==
This is a list of buildings that in the past held the title of tallest residential buildings in the world.

Name	City	Country	Height metres / feet	Floors	Years as tallest	Notes
Kotelnicheskaya Embankment Building	Moscow	Russia	176 metres (577 ft)	32	1952–1960	
Marina City I	Chicago	United States	179 metres (587 ft)	65	1960–1964	
Marina City II	Chicago	United States	179 metres (587 ft)	65	1960–1964	
Lake Point Tower	Chicago	United States	197 metres (646 ft)	69	1968–1991	
Tregunter Tower 3	Hong Kong	Hong Kong	220 metres (720 ft)	66	1991–2000	
The Belcher's 1	Hong Kong	Hong Kong	221 metres (725 ft)	63	2000–2000	
The Belcher's 2	Hong Kong	Hong Kong	221 metres (725 ft)	63	2000–2000	
Trump World Tower	New York City	United States	262 metres (860 ft)	72	2001–2003	
21st Century Tower	Dubai	United Arab Emirates	269 metres (883 ft)	55	2003–2005	
Q1	Gold Coast	Australia	322 metres (1,056 ft)	80	2005–2011	
The Marina Torch	Dubai	United Arab Emirates	352 metres (1,155 ft)	80	2011–2012	
Elite Residence	Dubai	United Arab Emirates	381 metres (1,250 ft)	91	2012–2012	
23 Marina	Dubai	United Arab Emirates	392 metres (1,286 ft)	90	2012–2012	
Princess Tower	Dubai	United Arab Emirates	414 metres (1,358 ft)	101	2012–2015	
432 Park Avenue	New York City	United States	425.5 metres (1,396 ft)	96	2015–2020	
Central Park Tower	New York City	United States	472 metres (1,549 ft)	98	2020–present	

== See also ==
- List of tallest buildings in the world
- List of tallest hotels in the world
- List of cities with the most skyscrapers
- List of buildings with 100 floors or more
- List of tallest buildings in Asia
- List of tallest residential buildings in Dubai
- List of tallest buildings in North America
- List of visionary tall buildings and structures
