= 252 East 57th Street =

Residential skyscraper in Manhattan, New York

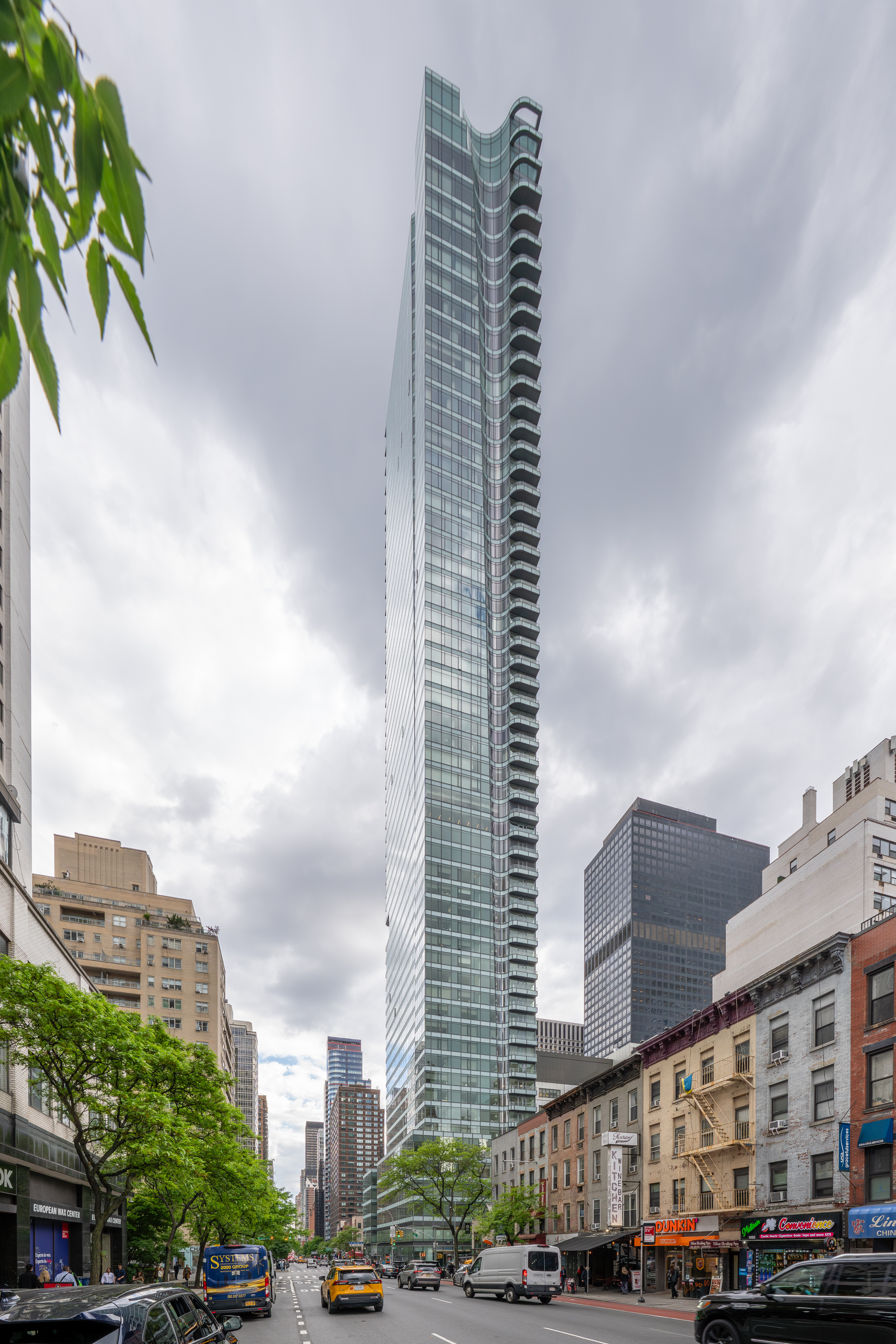
- 252 East 57th Street in 2026

General information
- Status: Completed
- Type: Residential, Mixed Use
- Location: Manhattan, New York
- Coordinates: 40°45′32.5″N 73°57′57″W
- Construction started: 2013
- Topped-out: October 13, 2015
- Opening: 2016

Height
- Roof: 217 m (712 ft)
- Top floor: 217 m (712 ft)

Technical details
- Floor count: 65
- Floor area: 40,500 m^{2} (436,000 ft^{2})

Design and construction
- Architects: Skidmore, Owings & Merrill; Roger Duffy; Scott Duncan
- Developer: World Wide Group, Rose Associates
- Structural engineer: DeSimone Consulting Engineers

Website
- www.252east57th.com

252 East 57th Street is a mixed use modernist style residential skyscraper in Midtown Manhattan, New York City, developed by the World Wide Group and Rose Associates, Inc. Construction started in 2013. The building is part of a luxury residential corridor along 57th Street called Billionaires' Row. The residential tower rises to 712 feet (217 m) with condominiums starting on the 36th floor, and is the 83rd tallest building in New York. The complex also houses two new schools and 78,000 square feet (7,200 m^{2}) of retail space, in addition to a Whole Foods Market. The residential tower and additional retail portions were anticipated to open in late 2016, and the project was largely complete by 2017.

== Architecture ==
The building was designed by Roger Duffy of Skidmore, Owings & Merrill. The building’s curved glass design is based on Alvar Aalto’s Aalto Vase of Finnish design created in 1936. The interiors are designed by AD100 designer Daniel Romauldez. It is Romauldez’s first new development commission, having previously designed private homes for celebrities Aerin Lauder, Tory Burch, Daphne Guinness, and Mick Jagger.

== Amenities ==
The building includes a private gated porte-cochère, automated parking, swimming pool, sauna, steam, and ice rooms. The 34th amenity floor will comprise a library, screening room, dining room, terrace, and fitness center with pilates, yoga, and private training studios. The building will also house two furnished guest suites.
