= Ralph Gardner Jr. =

American writer

Ralph Gardner Jr. (born June 16, 1953) is an American writer, author, and radio commentator. From 2010 to 2016, his daily column, the "Urban Gardner" appeared in the Wall Street Journal's Greater New York section. His work has also appeared in The New York Times, New York, The New York Observer, The New Yorker, and The Huffington Post.

== Career ==
Early in his career, Gardner worked for NBC News, Ed Koch's successful 1978 mayoral campaign, and served as the spokesperson for the New York City Department of Correction.

Gardner is a journalist and humorist, and chronicles life in New York City. His early writing appeared in the SoHo Weekly News, Spy, and Cosmopolitan. In the 1990s, Gardner wrote for The New York Observer, penning the Crime Blotter and contributing to the New Yorker's Diary. As a freelance writer, Gardner has written feature stories for New York (magazine) (Married to the Market) and The New York Times (The Farewell Tour).

In 2009, Gardner covered the Anthony Dryden Marshall trial for The Huffington Post and The Daily Beast. Marshall was the son of socialite and philanthropist Brooke Astor. The lengthy and highly publicized trial saw Marshall indicted on sixteen charges relating to the handling of his mother's will and financial affairs. The charges included conspiracy, grand larceny and possession of stolen property. On December 21, 2009, Marshall was sentenced to one to three years in prison. He served eight weeks before being granted immediate parole due to failing health.

In 2010, The Wall Street Journal launched the Greater New York section. Five days a week Gardner penned the "Urban Gardner" column, an account of the quotidian features of New York City from MetroCard machines (Swipe It, Swipe It Good) to beloved local citizens (A Jewel of a Proprietor) and the city's skyscrapers (Topping Expectations at the Empire State Building). Gardner wrote over 1,000 "Urban Gardner" before the Greater New York section closed in 2016.

In 2016, Gardner began a weekly radio commentary on WAMC Northeast Public Radio, a National Public Radio affiliate. Gardner has a residence in Columbia County, New York and his commentary focuses on topics relating to being a "weekender."

== Personal life ==
Born in New York City, Gardner is the son of Natalie Gardner and Ralph Gardner (1923–2005), Horatio Alger biographer. He has two brothers, James Gardner (1960), architectural critic, and Peter Gardner (1958). Gardner attended the Browning School and Middlebury College. In 1986, Gardner married Deborah Downing. The couple has two daughters, Lucy and Gracie. Gardner splits his time between New York City and Columbia County in upstate New York.

== Awards ==
In 2015, Gardner was honored with Mychal Judge Heart of New York prize from the New York Press Club. In 2016, Gardner was honored with the Browning School's Charles W. Cook Alumnus Achievement Award.

== Bibliography ==
- Young, Gifted, and Rich (1984)
- Hay Fever (2010)
