= Fawaz Alhokair =

Saudi billionaire property developer

- Born: 1965 or 1966 (age 59–60)

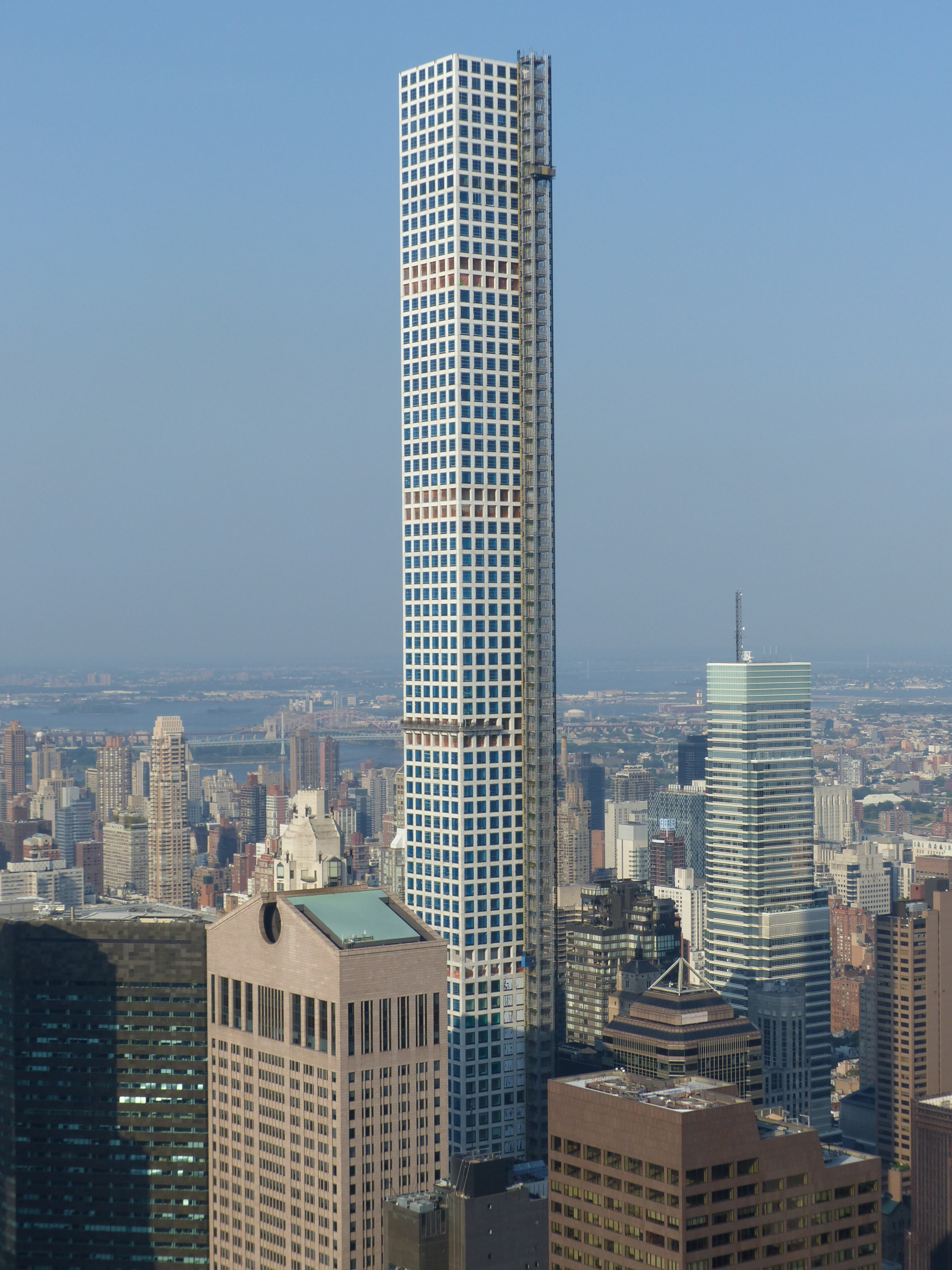
432 Park Avenue, 2015

Fawaz Alhokair (Arabic: فواز الحكير, romanized: Fawāz al-Ḥukayr; born 1965/66) is a Saudi billionaire property developer.

In 1989, he founded Fawaz Abdulaziz Alhokair Group with his two brothers, and started with just two menswear stores. The company now has 19 shopping malls in Saudi Arabia, and the local franchise rights to brands including Zara, Banana Republic, Gap, Nine West and Topshop.

Alhokair lives in Riyadh, Saudi Arabia.

In 2015, Alhokair bought the largest apartment at 432 Park Avenue, New York, a 8,255-square-foot (766.9 m^{2}), six-bedroom, seven-bath penthouse with a library, for $87.7 million. Later, in June 2021, it was reported that the apartment would be listed for $170 million.
