= Event of default =

An event of default is "an occurrence that gives rise to a non-defaulting party's right to seek remedies". It is any situation when a lender or landlord can sue for money or other rights, such as eviction or foreclosure on a mortgage.

Default is the occurrence of an event or circumstance against which a party to a contract seeks protection.

For example, a contract may state that the recording of a lien against certain property is a default. If the default is left uncured after notice and the passage of time, it may ripen into an event of default, which creates in the non-defaulting party certain rights, such as acceleration of a debt or the right to exit a contract.

In a revolving credit facility, the occurrence of an event of default normally also allows the lender to cancel any obligations to make further loan advances.

There are three types of event of default:

- payment default, i.e. the failure to pay principal or interest when it falls due for payment; or being late with rent after the three days' grace period;
- prospective default, when payment is not yet due, but it is clear that it will not be capable of being paid when it does fall due. For example, a payment is due in three months' time but the borrower has been put into liquidation: and
- covenant default, when the borrower fails to keep a promise (a covenant) that it has made in the contract.
