= Emirates Hills =

Emirates Hills تلال الإمارات
- Community
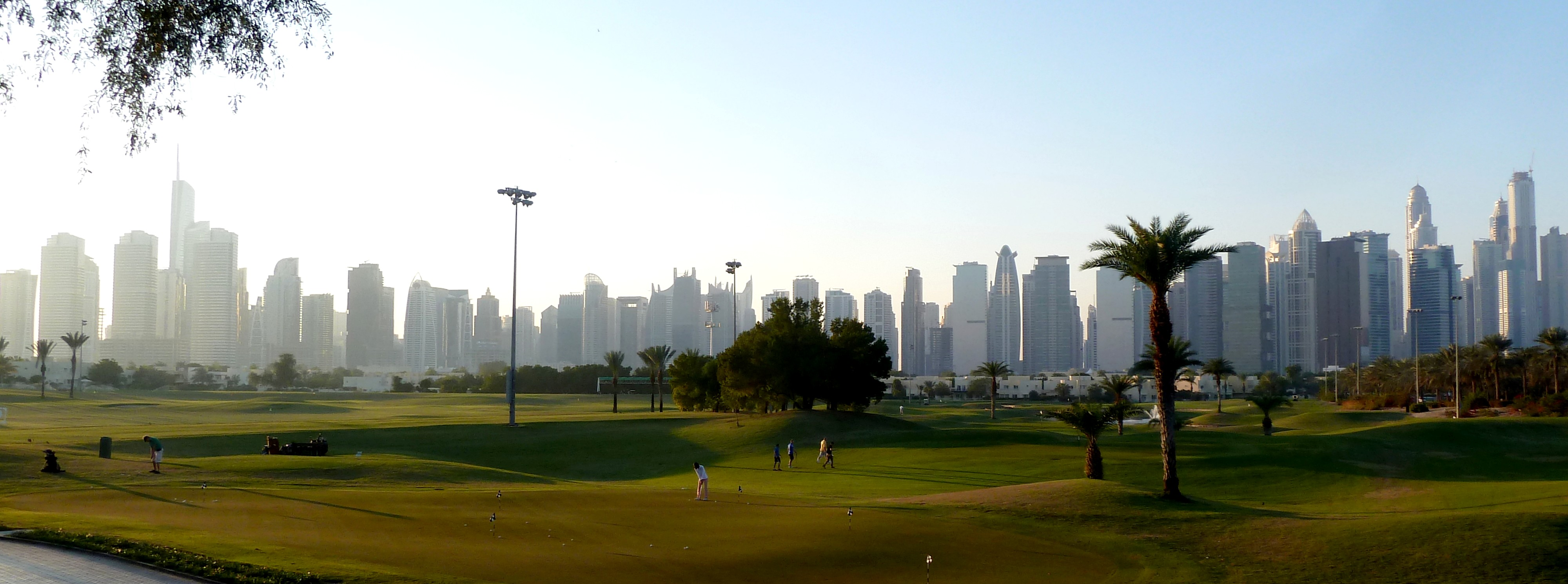
- View of the golf course at Emirates Hills
- Interactive map of Emirates Hills
- Coordinates: 25.06624°N 55.17111°E
- Country: United Arab Emirates
- Emirate: Emirate of Dubai
- City: Dubai
- Established: 2003

Area
  - Total: 3.5 km^{2} (1.4 sq mi)
- Community number: 388, 393, 394

Emirates Hills (Arabic: تلال الإمارات) is a gated community located in Dubai, United Arab Emirates. It is named after Beverly Hills.

Emirates Hills is referred to as 'Dubai's old-money enclave' and the 'crown jewel for high-net-worth investors'. The community is regarded as unique because of the size of the plots, the location next to two golf courses-Montgomerie and Emirates Golf Club, the presence of lake-facing mansions and its central location. In 2025 Lakshmi Mittal bought a Villa in Emirates Hills for AED 425 million/$116 million (some news outlets erroneously reported the price as AED 367 million/$100 million.) Most recently, The Sunday Times newspaper reported that the price paid was in fact 'about $200 million (£152.7 million) for a baroque mansion at Emirates Hills'. (The difference in published values are likely due to some figures taking account of fixtures and fittings in the final purchase price while others, such as those available at the Dubai Land Department, excluding them altogether.)

In January 2026, the New York Post reported that Formula 1 heiress Petra Ecclestone had purchased a '$70 million home in the Emirates Hills'. The Villa sits on a 27,000 square foot plot facing the golf course. Ecclestone's husband confirmed the purchase describing Emirates Hills as "the most luxurious community in Dubai".

Realtors maintain that the real value lies in the land rather than the Villa construction. The most coveted plots are those with views over the golf course that typically sell for between AED 2000/$545 and AED 3000/$818 per square foot. A handful of plots that are located on high ground with extensive views over lakes and the premium holes of the golf course can command huge premiums. These rarely available lands sell at starting rates of AED 4,500/$1,226 per square foot and can surpass prevailing records of AED 7,154/$2,000 per square foot. In August 2025, an Emirates Hills Villa "with sweeping views over the lakes and the distinguished Address Montgomerie golf course" sold for AED 260 million/$71 million or AED 18,489/$5,000 per square foot, according to data from GCP-Reidin.

In 2022 an Emirates Hills plot of 41,704 square feet sold for AED 209 million/$57 million or AED 5,011/$1365 per square foot.

On 15 July 2026 the Khaleej Times Newspaper reported that a villa in Emirates Hills was leased for AED 17 million ($4.6 million)) per year, making it the most expensive residential property ever leased in the UAE.

== Overview ==
Emirates Hills was developed by Emaar Properties, classified as freehold and open for anyone to purchase. The majority of owners are from wealthy families in the region, and it has been noted as one of the most exclusive neighbourhoods in the GCC.

Some notable residents included the late Benazir Bhutto; the managing director of Géant Middle East, Mohammed Ayub Shaikh; Abdul Rahiman Abdul Azeez, owner of Alpha Smart Security Systems Business; and the owners of the Middle East Broadcasting Center and Habib Bank.

Properties in Emirates Hills look out over the fairways of the Address Montgomerie, an 18-hole golf course created by architect Desmond Muirhead and golfer Colin Montgomerie.

Emirates Hills is in close proximity to Dubai British School, Dubai International Academy, Emirates International School, Meadows and Emirates Hill Nursery, and Raffles Nursery. Vida Emirates Hills hotel is located here, close to the golf course.

== Notable residents ==
- Vinod Adani wealthiest person in the Gulf (member of Adani Group)
- Lakshmi Mittal Indian billionaore (chairman of AcelceorMittal)
- Hussani Sajwani wealthiest Emirati (member of Damac properties)
- Reinuka Jagtiani Dubai based Indian billionaire (member of Hallmark group)
- Sunil Vaswani (Owner and chairman of the Stallion Group)
- The Gupta family, a wealthy and influential family from India.
- Jacob Zuma, former South African president.
- Raghuvinder Kataria (Investor and chairman of Kataria Holdings)
- Sima Ved (member of Apparel Group)
- Chirag Suri (former International Cricketer and influencer)
- Kabir Mulchandani (real estate tycoon and CEO of SKAI)
- Hasan Abdullah Ismaik (Former CEO of Arabtec)
- Andrew and Tristan Tate, social media personalities.
- Shah Rukh Khan, bollywood actor and icon
- Mahesh Tourani, business person
- Akshay Kumar, bollywood actor and icon
- Anil Kapoor, bollywood actor and icon
- Abhishek Bachchan, bollywood actor and icon
- Aishwarya Rai Bachchan, bollywood actor and icon
- Roger Federer, Tennis Star
- Lionel Messi, Soccer Star
- David Beckham, Soccer Star
- Lindsay Lohan, hollywood actor and icon
- Rihanna, musician, singer and pop star
- Will Smith, hollywood actor and icon
- Sukhbir, Indian hit singer

== See also ==
- List of communities in Dubai
