= Damak (disambiguation) =

Damak may refer to:

== Places ==
- Damak, a municipality in Nepal
  - Damak Multiple Campus, a community campus in Damak, Nepal
  - Damak Model Higher Secondary School, a secondary school also in Damak, Nepal
  - Himalaya Higher Secondary School, Damak, Jhapa, a different secondary school in Damak, Nepal
- Damak, Hungary, a village
- Damak Sot, river in India
- Damak-e Aliabad, a village in Iran
- Damak (state constituency) in Pahang, Malaysia
- Damak Gelugur, village in Serdang Bedagai Regency, North Sumatra Province, Indonesia
- Damak Maleho, village in Deli Serdang Regency, Indonesia
- Damak Sırtı, ridge in Turkey
- Damak Tolong Buho, village in Serdang Bedagai Regency, North Sumatra Province, Indonesia
- Damak Urat, village in Serdang Bedagai Regency, North Sumatra Province, Indonesia
- Kampung Damak, a polling district in Jerantut (federal constituency)
- Lau Damak, village in Langkat Regency, North Sumatra Province, Indonesia
  - Sei Lau Damak, river in Indonesia
- Ujung Damak, point in Indonesia

== Other ==
- Damak, a 1967 film featuring Kasma Booty
- Damak, a character in the 1977 film Jay Vejay

== See also ==
- DAMAC (disambiguation)
