= DAMAC =

DAMAC can refer to:

== Organizations ==
- DAMAC Properties, a property development company
- DAMAC Maison Hotels & Resorts, the hospitality division of DAMAC Properties
- Damac F.C., a Saudi Arabian professional sports club based in Khamis Mushait city

== Buildings ==
- DAMAC Residenze, a supertall skyscraper under construction in Dubai Marina
- DAMAC Paramount Hotel & Residences, a residential and hotel tower under construction in Downtown Dubai
- DAMAC Maison-Paramount Tower 1, 2, and 3, a set of 250-metre-tall residential towers under construction in Downtown Dubai
- Dubai Marina (Dubai Metro), a rapid transit station on the red line of the Dubai Metro

== Other uses ==
- "Me Damac", a track on the album Ronald Dregan: Dreganomics by Mac Dre

== See also ==
- Damak (disambiguation)
