= Roberto Cavalli =

Italian fashion designer and inventor (1940–2024)

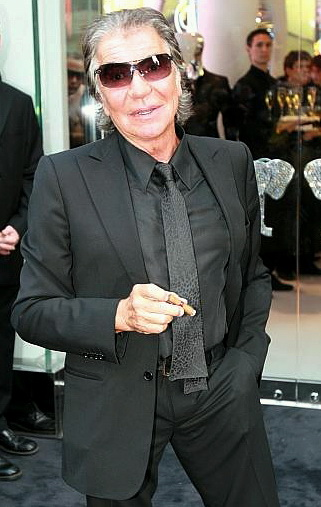
- Cavalli in 2009
- Born: 15 November 1940; Florence, Kingdom of Italy
- Died: 12 April 2024 (aged 83); Florence, Italy
- Occupation: Fashion designer
- Labels: Roberto Cavalli; Justcavalli; Roberto Cavalli Junior; Roberto Cavalli Parfums; Roberto Cavalli Home
- Spouse(s): Silvanella Giannoni (m. 1964; div. 1974) Eva Düringer (m. 1980; div. 2010)
- Partner: Sandra Nilsson
- Children: 6

Roberto Cavalli (Italian pronunciation: [roˈbɛrto kaˈvalli]; 15 November 1940 – 12 April 2024) was an Italian fashion designer and inventor. He was known for exotic prints and for creating the sand-blasted look for jeans. The Roberto Cavalli fashion house sells luxury clothing, perfume, and leather accessories.

== Early life ==
Cavalli was born in a suburb of Florence, Italy, on 15 November 1940. His grandfather, Giuseppe Rossi, an artist and member of the Macchiaioli Movement, produced work that was exhibited in the Uffizi Gallery. His father was killed in 1944 during the Cavriglia massacre, a Nazi reprisal on civilians, when he was four. Cavalli enrolled at the local art institute, concentrating on textile print. While still a student, he made a series of flower prints on knit that caught the attention of major Italian hosiery manufacturers.

== Career ==
In the early 1970s, he invented and patented a leather-printing process, and started creating patchworks of different materials. He debuted these techniques in Paris, immediately winning commissions from the likes of Hermès and Pierre Cardin. At age 32, he presented his first namesake collection at the Salon for Prêt-à-Porter in Paris. He brought it to the catwalks of the Sala Bianca of Palazzo Pitti in Florence, and later his Milano Collezioni featured jeans made of printed denim, intarsia leathers, brocade, and wild-animal prints. In 1972, he opened his first boutique in Saint-Tropez.

In 1975, he founded the house of Roberto Cavalli fashion, incorporating "femininity, spiritedness, and leopard print" as its pillars. The brand acquired appeal for its stable and unvarying looks despite the changing trends.

In Milan in 1994, Cavalli presented the first sand-blasted jeans. By December of the same year, he had opened boutiques in Saint Barth, in the French Caribbean, followed by others in Venice and Saint-Tropez. Besides his main line, which is sold in more than 50 countries worldwide, Cavalli designed RC Menswear, as well as the youth-aimed diffusion line Just Cavalli, launched in 2000, today encompasses men’s and women’s wear and accessories, watches, jewelry, perfumes, eye wear, under garments, and beach attire. There is also the Angels & Devils Children Collection, the Class line, shoes and two underwear collections. In 2002, Cavalli opened his first café-store in Florence, revamping it with his signature animal prints. Soon after, in Milan, the Just Cavalli café at Torre Branca opened, as well as another boutique on Via della Spiga.

In July 2011, his company collection was presented at the catwalk of The Brandery fashion show in Barcelona.

On 18 June 2013, he was awarded an Honorary Master Diploma in Fashion Management from Domus Academy in Milan, during a ceremony after which he held a lectio magistralis.

== Personal life and death ==
In 1964, Cavalli married Silvanella Giannoni, with whom he had two children, before their divorce in 1974.

In 1977, while serving as a judge at the Miss Universe pageant, he met contestant Eva Düringer, whom he married in 1980. Together, they had three children and Düringer became his business partner. They worked together until selling the business. They divorced in 2010.

In 2023, Cavalli announced the birth of his sixth child, with his partner, Swedish model and actress Sandra Nilsson.

Cavalli died at his home in Florence, Italy, on 12 April 2024, aged 83, following a long period of ill-health.

== Brand ==
As of January 2014, Cavalli returned to the role of men's creative director from his son, Daniele Cavalli, starting with the 2014 fall collection, appointing Martyn Bal as his righthand man. Also, on 24 January 2014, Gianluca Brozzetti (CEO) and Carlo Di Biagio (COO) announced they were leaving the fashion brand.

In May 2014, Cavalli approached Investcorp, an investment firm in the Persian Gulf, as a potential buyer of a stake in his fashion brand.

Many leading models have worked for the brand: Jessica Stam, Eva Riccobono, Laetitia Casta, Natasha Poly, Mariacarla Boscono, Karen Elson, Karolina Kurkova, and Ivan Olita among others.

Former Acne Studios creative consultant Paul Surridge succeeded Peter Dundas as creative director for the brand in May 2017.

In 2019, DAMAC Properties's Hussain Sajwani completed the acquisition of Italian fashion group Roberto Cavalli.

In May 2026 Marquee Brands acquired Roberto Cavalli from DAMAC Properties.

== Criticism ==
Cavalli was sharply criticized in 2004 by the Hindu community for marketing a line of feminine underwear (designed for Harrods) which featured the images of Hindu goddesses. The line was eventually withdrawn and formal apologies were made.

The Maktab Tarighat Oveyssi Shahmaghsoudi school of Islamic Sufism accused Cavalli of copying their "sacred emblem" for branding the Just Cavalli line. The Sufi school brought forth a proceeding in Europe to the Office for Harmonization in the Internal Market (OHIM). "On 16 May 2014, the OHIM pronounced itself in the first degree rejecting the request made by the School to invalidate the Just Cavalli logo. The Court stated that the two logos are not mistakable and do not present any similarities." Nonetheless, students of the Sufi school continued their protest.
