= Morellato Group =

Italian manufacturer of jewels and watches

- Type: Jewelry and watchmaker
- Industry: Jewelry and watch manufacturing
- Founded: 1930
- Founder: Giulio Morellato
- Headquarters: Fratte di Santa Giustina in Colle, Italy
- Area served: Worldwide
- Key people: Massimo Carraro CEO
- Products: Jewelry and wristwatches
- Website: www.morellatogroup.com

Morellato Group is an Italian corporate group that designs and manufactures design jewellery and watches. The group's parent company was founded by Giulio Morellato initially in Bologna and later was moved to near Padova.

== History ==
Morellato started operations in the 1930s, as a maker of watch straps.

In 1990, Massimo Carraro bought the small family watchmaking business from his father and two partners. The company started to make jewelry bozes in 1986, and jewelry in 2000.

In 2005, Morellato acquired the licence for Miss Sixty jewelry. In 2006, Morellato acquired Sector Group (Sector, Philip Watch, several licences, and a foothold in the USA and the menswear market). The following year, the group changed its name to Morellato & Sector, bought the watch and jewelry store Bluespirit, and established itself in India and China.

In April 2014, Morellato signed an alliance with Spanish watchmaker Geresa, making the new joint-venture Spain's second-biggest watchmaker, after Rolex. The two companies invested $70 million in the new venture. Through that deal, Morellato got Geresa's distribution networks, but 50% of Morellato Group's holding company (Morellato &Sector S.A) became the property of Geresa. Morellato launched in the Philippines.

The Morellato Group and Pepe Jeans London signed an agreement for the production and worldwide distribution of watches Pepe Jeans London branded that started during autumn 2014. In 2015, Morellato partnered with Trussardi to create the T01 collection. In February 2016, luxury brand Furla launched a new collection of watches designed by Morellato. Morellato also chose Grenchen Time, as its distributor for the UK.

Over the following years, Morellato bought European jewellery retail chains Mister Watch (2019), Cleor (2019), and Christ Group (2023).

== Activities ==
The group is present on the Italian and international market with brands of property and brands in license such as Just Cavalli, Furla and Maserati. It is also one of the leading global manufacturer of watch straps and cases for jewelry, which constitute the original activity of Morellato since 1930. Morellato’s focus markets are Europe, the Middle East and Asia, with a particular concentration on China.

Besides headquarters in Fratte di Santa Giustina in Colle in the province of Padova with the design and marketing offices in Milan, the group is divided into a number of branches in the USA, Germany, France, Spain, Switzerland and Hong Kong; it is also present, through some joint ventures, in China, United Arab Emirates (Morellato Middle East) and India.

Since 1995, 5 million pieces were sold every year. In 2005, the group successfully started to expand its production in jewelry and watches.

In 2012, the group reported a $23 million profit margin on its sales of $250 million (up from $21 million the year before). In 2013, the group was ranked 17th in worldwide sales.

== Subsidiaries ==
The following companies are wholly owned subsidiaries of Morellato Group:

- Morellato
- Sector No Limits
- Philip Watch
- Chronostar
- Bluespirit
- Pianegonda joy
- Morellato Middle East

== Partnerships ==
- Chiara Ferragni collection (since 2021)
