= DAMAC Tower Nine Elms =

Coordinates: 51.4841°N 0.1246°W

DAMAC Tower
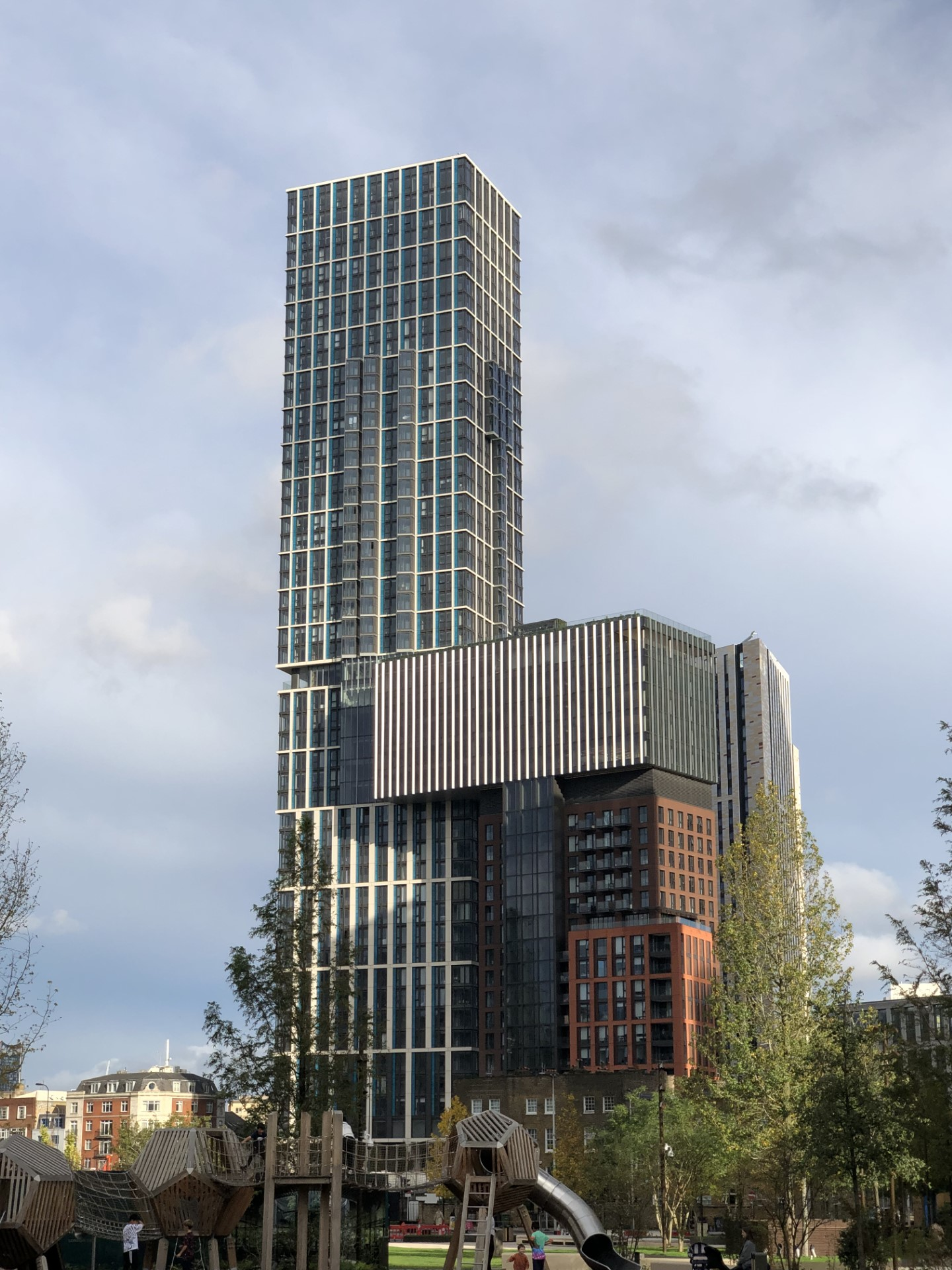
- DAMAC Tower in October 2023

General information
- Status: Completed
- Location: Nine Elms, London, England
- Completed: 2022

Height
- Roof: 170m

Technical details
- Floor count: 50

Design and construction
- Architect: Kohn Pedersen Fox
- Other designers: Donatella (interiors)
- Main contractor: Multiplex

Website
- DAMAC Tower Nine Elms London - DAMAC Properties

DAMAC Residential Tower is a 50-storey, 170-metre high skyscraper located at 69-71 Bondway, Vauxhall, London. Originally scheduled to be completed by 2020, the tower's opening was ultimately delayed to June 2022.

The apartments went on sale on 21 July 2015, with all the Thames-side apartments having been "pre-sold". Prices start at £711,000 for a studio.

== Planning history ==
In November 2013, KPF announced a proposal for new building to be called "New Bondway", featuring two connected towers of 50 stories and 23 stories featuring 450 flats, 3,700 m^{2} of office space and 1,000 m^{2} of shops. The planning application to the London Borough of Lambeth is 14/00601/FUL.

== Ownership ==
The original joint developers, Citygrove Securities and McLaren Property, sold the project to DAMAC Properties in June 2015.

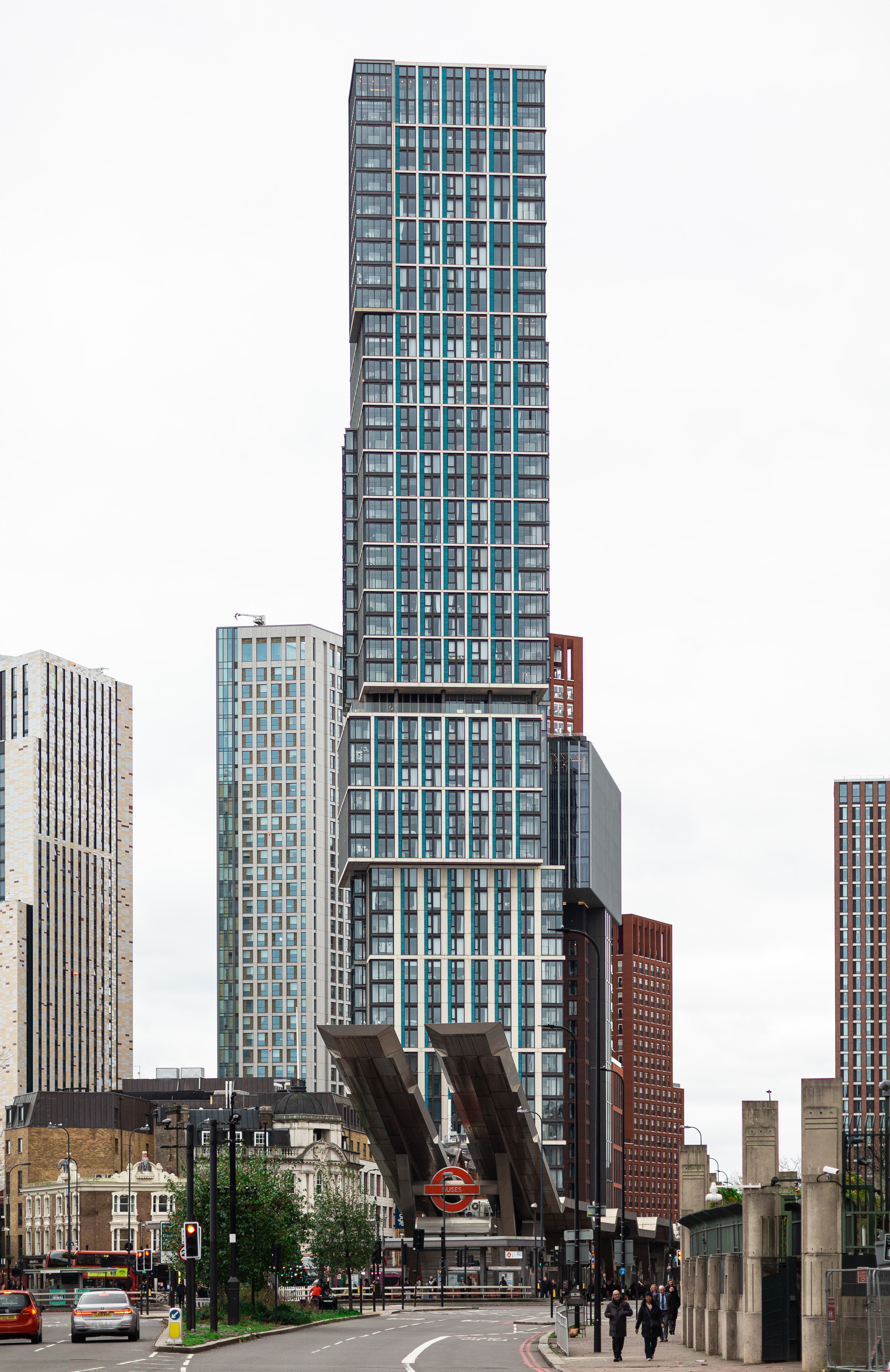

== Construction ==
In August 2016, it was announced that DAMAC had awarded the £200 million building contract to Lendlease.

== Gallery ==
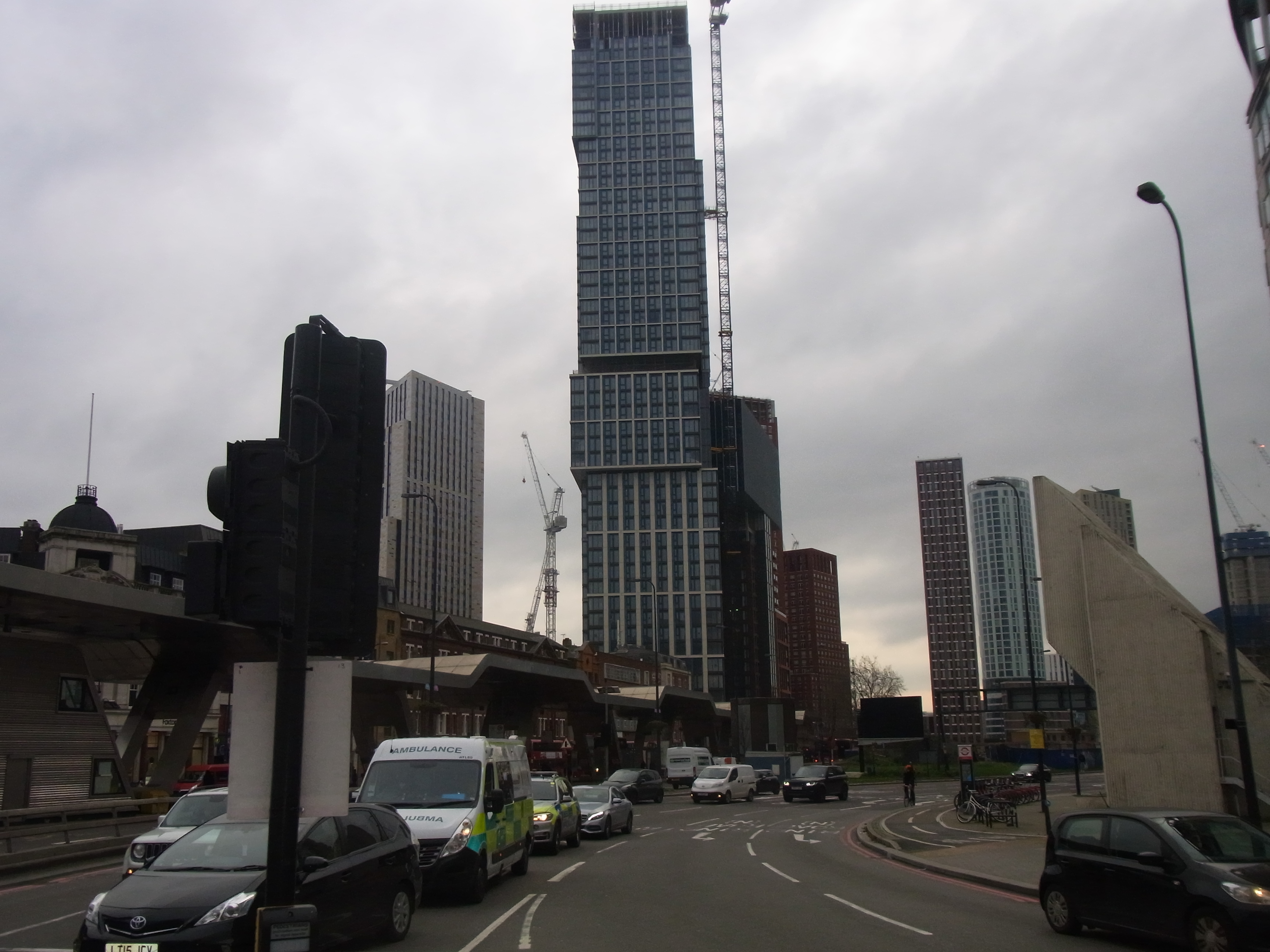
The building in December 2019.
