= Ocean Heights (Dubai) =

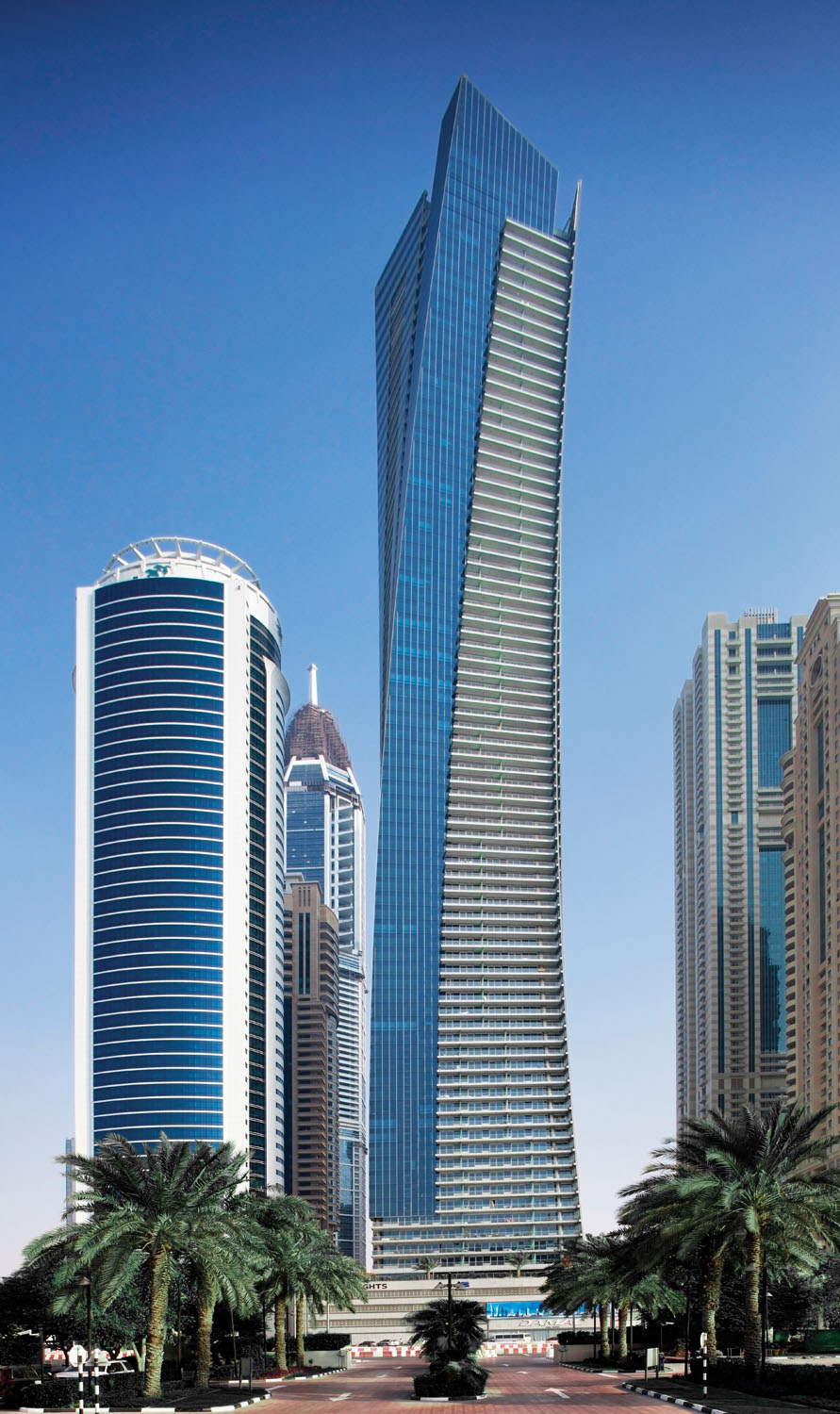

- Location within United Arab Emirates

General information
- Status: Completed
- Type: Residential
- Location: Area 392-Block Marsa Dubai; Dubai
- Coordinates: 25°05′26.13″N 55°08′55.83″E
- Construction started: 13 April 2007
- Completed: 17 April 2010
- Opening: 27 September 2010

Height
- Architectural: 310 m (1,017 ft)
- Top floor: 288.6 m (947 ft)

Technical details
- Floor count: 83 (3 basement floor)
- Floor area: 113,416 m^{2} (1,220,800 sq ft)

Design and construction
- Architects: Andrew Bromberg, Aedas
- Developer: DAMAC Properties
- Structural engineer: Meinhardt
- Main contractor: Arabtec

Ocean Heights is a supertall residential skyscraper in Dubai Marina, Dubai, UAE. The tower stands 310 m (1,017 ft) tall with 83 floors. The tower is designed by Andrew Bromberg of Aedas. The building was topped out on 22 December 2009, and completed in 2010.

As of 2022, Ocean Heights is the seventh-tallest residential building in Dubai and 20th-tallest residential building in the world.

The tower, with its unique curves and twisting motion as it ascends, is actually the third version of the tower proposed by DAMAC Properties Co. The first version had the tower at a much shorter 38 floors, the second had 50. The 83-floor tower houses more than 519 condominiums and is located along Al Sufouh Road in Dubai Marina.

== See also ==
- List of tallest buildings in Dubai
- List of tallest buildings in the United Arab Emirates
- List of tallest residential buildings
- List of twisted buildings
