= Roberto Cavalli (company) =

Italian clothing company

Roberto Cavalli S.p.A.
- Type: Società per azioni
- Industry: Luxury; fashion; food and beverage
- Founded: 1970 (56 years ago) in Osmannoro, Italy
- Founder: Roberto Cavalli
- Successor: Hussain Sajwani
- Headquarters: Sesto Fiorentino, Italy; 43.8091918°N 1.1805648°E
- Area served: Worldwide
- Key people: Fausto Puglisi (Creative Director)
- Products: Clothing; fashion accessories; perfumes; interior design; hospitality; alcohol; real estate; pet products
- Revenue: $92 Million - $750 Million (2025)
- Number of employees: 170 - 710
- Website: robertocavalli.com

Roberto Cavalli S.p.A. (Italian pronunciation: [roˈbɛrto kaˈvalli]) is an Italian luxury fashion company founded by the designer Roberto Cavalli in Osmannoro, Florence, during the 1970s. Known for animal prints on leather and textiles, the label manufactures and markets haute couture, ready-to-wear, and accessories, including handbags, eye wear, watches, swimwear, pens, bagpacks, shoes, perfumes and jewelry. The company is also involved in interior design projects for high-end buildings and hotels.

In 2015, the Italian investment fund Clessidra SGR acquired a 90 percent stake in Roberto Cavalli to relaunch the company. Sergio Azzolari was a CEO of the company and Fausto Puglisi the creative director.

== History ==
=== Founding ===
Roberto Cavalli studied at the Accademia di Belle Arti di Firenze (Academy of Fine Arts of Florence). His grandfather was a painter of the Macchiaioli group. Starting in the 1960s from his silk printing shop, Roberto began to apply a new painterly technique to fully fashioned garments, which later resulted in garment dyeing techniques. He further expanded his material experimentation in the 1970s, predominantly focusing on leather.

In 1970, Roberto's debut collection in Paris showcased leather patchwork designs, created with the collaboration of Mario Valentino. In 1972, he presented patchwork designs applied to jeans in the first Roberto Cavalli Women's Runway Collection Show at Palazzo Pitti in Florence, a prêt-à-porter event at the time. His work attracted many international fashion labels, including Hermès, Pierre Cardin, Krizia and Emilio Pucci.

=== Expansion ===
The 1994 Collection at the Milan Fashion Week presented tiger and wildlife motifs applied to jeans, printed clothing, embroidered fur and long gowns. Animal prints were a distinctive element of the brand. Subsequently, the fashion house pioneered the introduction of sand-blasted denim and was the first to showcase Lycra stretch jeans. New clothing lines were launched on the market: Just Cavalli, Angels & Devils (renamed Roberto Cavalli Junior), and Class Cavalli. The first Roberto Cavalli mono-brand boutique opened in Venice in 1996. At the end of 2001, the brand was distributed in more than 30 countries, including the United States, Asian and Russian markets.

The Marcolin group started to develop and distribute Roberto Cavalli and Just Cavalli sunglasses and optical frames in 1998. In 2002 the company collaborated with Sector to design 6 Cavalli watch lines, which itself made €3.9 million revenue. The Just Cavalli Club opened in Milan the same year. In 2007, Roberto Cavalli became the first Italian fashion brand to create a limited collection for the fast-fashion retailer H&M.

On the 40th anniversary celebration in 2010, the label presented a runway collection in Paris, which included its dresses. In 2012 the new interior design division Roberto Cavalli Home debuted at the Salone del Mobile trade fair. New licensing agreements were signed with Renzo Rosso's OTB Group for Just Cavalli and Coty Inc. For Roberto Cavalli and Just Cavalli perfumes. The company closed 2014 with €210 million revenue and €12 million loss.

=== Peter Dundas, 2015–2017 ===
In 2015 the Italian private equity fund Clessidra SGR acquired a 90% stake in Roberto Cavalli with some other minor partners including L-GAM, Chow Tai Fook Enterprises, and Roberto Cavalli himself. Named CEO in July 2016, former Versace head Gian Giacomo Ferraris started a reorganization plan to rationalize the production, logistics and retail cost operations. The Milan headquarters was closed and relocated to the Osmannoro plant, where the manufacturing of men's, children's and underwear lines were brought back in-house. The group focused on accessories, women's pret-à-porter and men's collections.

=== Paul Surridge, 2017–20200 ===
In May 2017, the company appointed Paul Surridge as the new creative director. Surridge presented his Spring/Summer 2018 debut collection for Roberto Cavalli at the Milano Moda Donna fashion show. A recent partnership with the real estate developer DAMAC Properties based in Dubai led to the construction of the new Cavalli Villas in the Middle East.

In 2019, the company was struggling financially. It closed its US stores and engaged the liquidation of its North American operations. On 28 November 2019, Hussain Sajwani, president of DAMAC, purchased the company through the private investment company Vision Investments. The company enhanced its e-commerce primarily as a result of the COVID-19 pandemic, and maintained its physical stores in Europe, Middle East and Asia.

=== Fausto Puglisi, 2020–present ===
Initially brought on as creative consultant to an in-house design team in 2020, Fausto Puglisi has been leading the brand's design since then.

In 2020, the company announced it would move its historic headquarters from Sesto Fiorentino to Milan.

In 2022, Damac’s Hussain Sajwani bought a $120 million plot in Miami on the site of collapsed Surfside condominium, in order to launch a real estate division.

In 2023, Puglisi designed 20 different Roberto Cavalli looks for singer Taylor Swift's “The Eras” tour.

== Brands/Lines ==
The galaxy of the Cavalli group lines include:

- Roberto Cavalli: the historic collection of evening gowns. The new era introduced daywear clothing and accessories, including shoes, handbags, leather goods, and jewellery.
- Just Cavalli: launched in 1998. Developed and distributed by licensing Renzo Rosso's OTB since 2011.
- Class Cavalli: outwear for women and men, distributed by licensing company Swinger International since 2015.
- Roberto Cavalli Junior: produced in-house, for boys and girls aged 0–16 years.
- Roberto Cavalli Home: officially launched in 2012 at the Salone del Mobile di Milano trade fair, the interiors' collections are developed through the collaboration of Made in Italy's partners. Among these: JC Passion Srl for the furniture line; Industrie Emiliana Parati SpA for wallpapers; Gruppo Ceramiche Ricchetti SpA for tiles; Caleffi SpA for home textiles; Arnolfo di Cambio – Compagnia del Cristallo Srl for l’Art de La Table and La Murrina for lamps and accessories crafted with glasses Made in Murano.

== Advertising ==
For it advertising campaigns, Robert Cavalli has worked with various photographers, including Annie Leibovitz (2005), Steven Meisel (2012), Michel Comte (2014). and Francesco Carrozzini (2014–2015).

== Distribution ==
The first Roberto Cavalli mono-branded boutique opened in Venice in 1996, followed by the Milan-based boutique in via della Spiga in 2000, and new stores opened in Rome and Florence. The group currently operates a network of 59 direct stores and 29 franchisee stores across the globe and its products are available in over 300 wholesale retail stores.

== Bibliography ==
- Cavalli, Roberto (2013). Just me (in Italian). Milan: Mondadori. ISBN 978-88-04-62920-7.
- Cavalli, Roberto (2013). Just me (in Italian). Milan: Mondadori. ISBN 978-88-04-62920-7.
- Cavalli, Roberto (2010). Il nero non è mai assoluto [Black is never absolute] (in Italian). Milan: Bompiani. ISBN 978-88-4526-587-7.
- Roberto Cavalli on
- Arroyuelo, Javier (2002). Roberto Cavalli. Paris: Assoulin. ISBN 2-84323-391-7.
- Cavalli, Roberto (2010). Roberto Cavalli. New York: Rizzoli International Publications. ISBN 978-0847836093.
