= Automotive industry in Nigeria =

Car industry in Nigeria

Roughly 720,000 cars per year are being sold in Nigeria every year. Only c. 140.000 of them have been built domestically.

== History ==
Automotive industry in Nigeria dates back to the 1950s and consists of the production of passenger cars and commercial trucks. Early production was led by the assembly line of Bedford TJ trucks made by United Africa Company's subsidiary, Federated Motors Industries and SCOA's production of Peugeot 404 pickup trucks. Significant development began in the 1970s, during a period of oil boom, the Federal Government of Nigeria signed joint venture partnerships with foreign car manufacturers to assemble vehicles and provide technical assistance towards vertical integration within the local industry. These foreign brands went on to dominate the industry from the middle of the 1970s to the end of the 1980s. The passenger vehicles brands were Peugeot Nigeria Ltd and Volkswagen. The commercial vehicles manufacturers, Leyland, Anambra Motor Manufacturing, and Steyr competed with Bedford truck for dominance. The companies simply assembled kits and completely knocked down parts imported from abroad. In the marketplace, demand was largely dictated by the government's budgetary concerns. Towards the end of the 1980s the industry was negatively affected by a downturn in the economy, government's inconsistency and the higher cost of locally manufactured cars compared to imported counterparts. By 2000, used foreign cars dominated car sales in the country, and the rise of these affordable used cars negatively impacted the development of backward integration in the industry. Recently, a local brand, Innoson has opened an assembly plant in the country.

Some of the plants had been privatized, VON was sold to Stallion Group and Leyland was sold to Busan. Production has been scaled down from the heights of the 1980s.

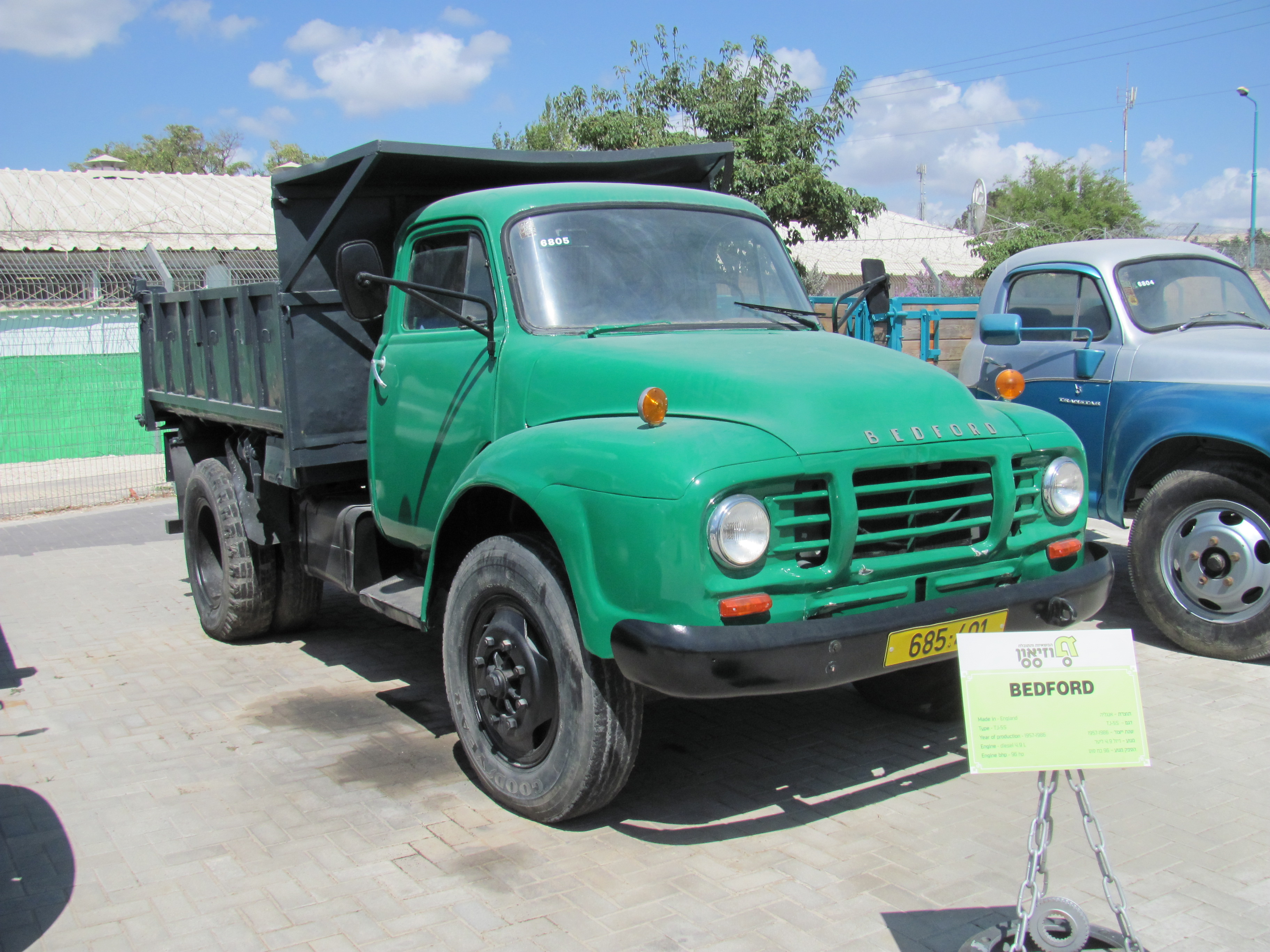
Bedford TJ-55

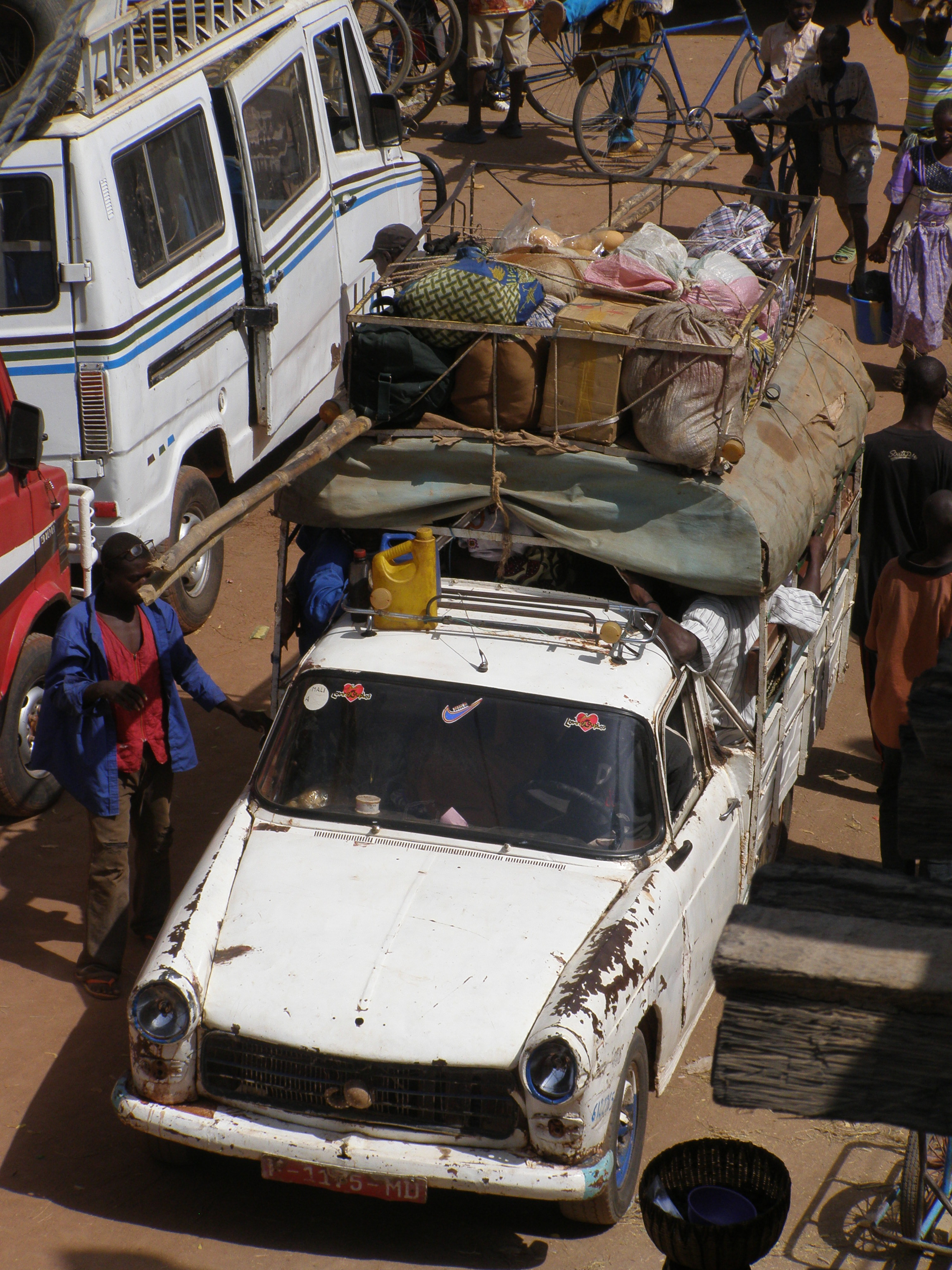
MaliPeugeot1-pickup truck

Before the Nigerian Civil War, automobile production was in the form of assemblage of partially knocked down bits. Federated Motor Industries, a branch of UAC produced Bedford TJtrucks and SCOA assembled Peugeot 404 pick up trucks. The cab, chassis, axles and wheels were imported separately to reduce the total landing cost of importation.

In 1969, hoping to promote technology transfer, industrialization and reap gains from backward integration, the Nigerian government published a request for proposal for the establishment of automotive assembly plants. About 20 car manufacturers responded but ultimately selection was influenced by the demand of the brands in Nigeria. To set up passenger vehicles assembly plants, the country went into negotiations with Peugeot of France and Volkswagen AG of Germany, the government also had in mind a medium term outlook of the provision of technical assistance to develop local content inputs with the intention that by 1990, the locally manufactured vehicles will have 100% input sourced locally. Negotiations also were initiated with Steyr of Austria, Leyland of Great Britain, Daimler-Benz of Germany and Fiat of Italy for commercial truck production. The government initiated moves to protect the local industry by increasing customs duties on fully built cars and trucks shipped into the country.

=== Passenger cars ===
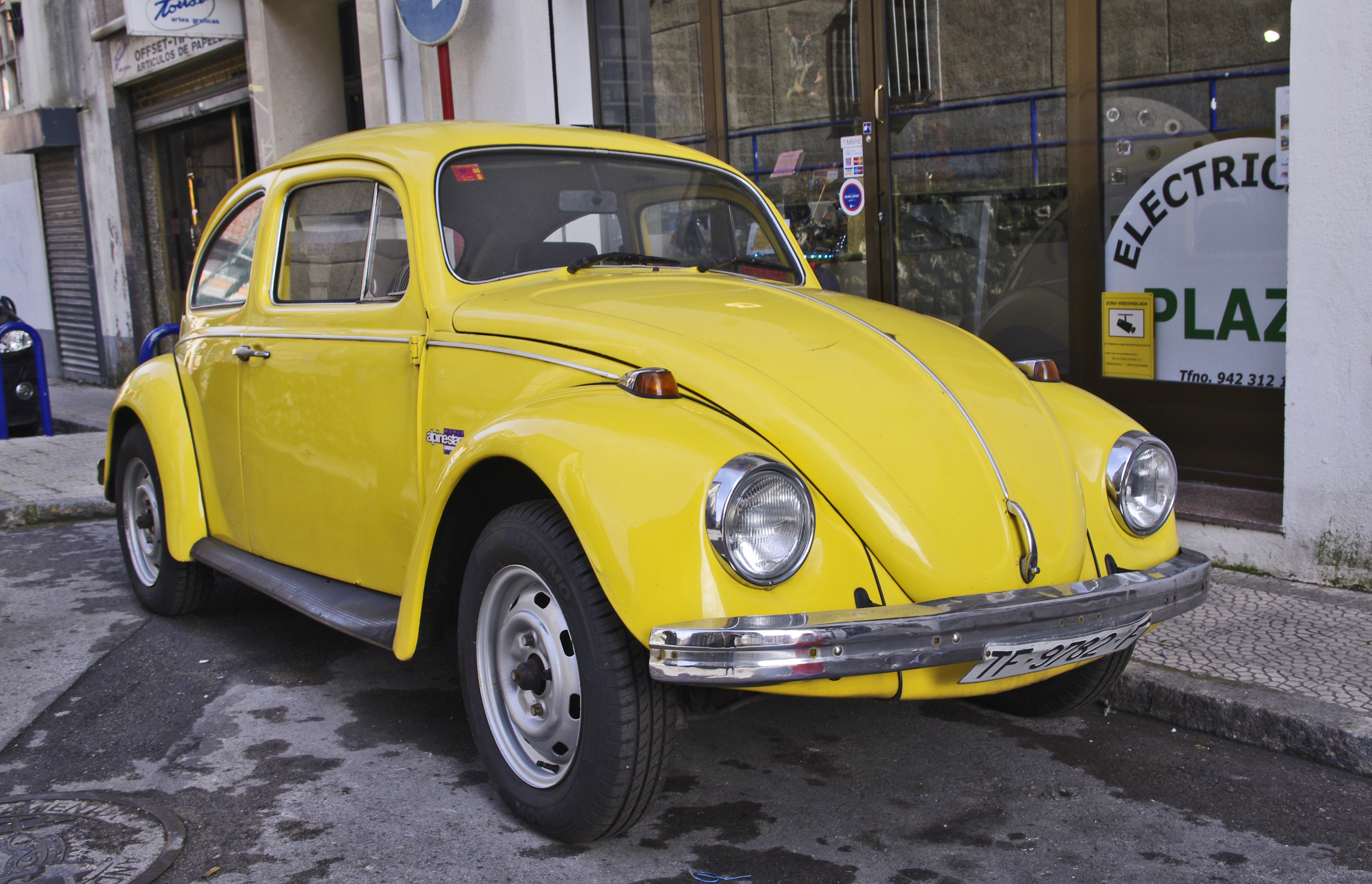
1976 Volkswagen 1300 L 'Escarabajo' (Typ 1) (5476921123)

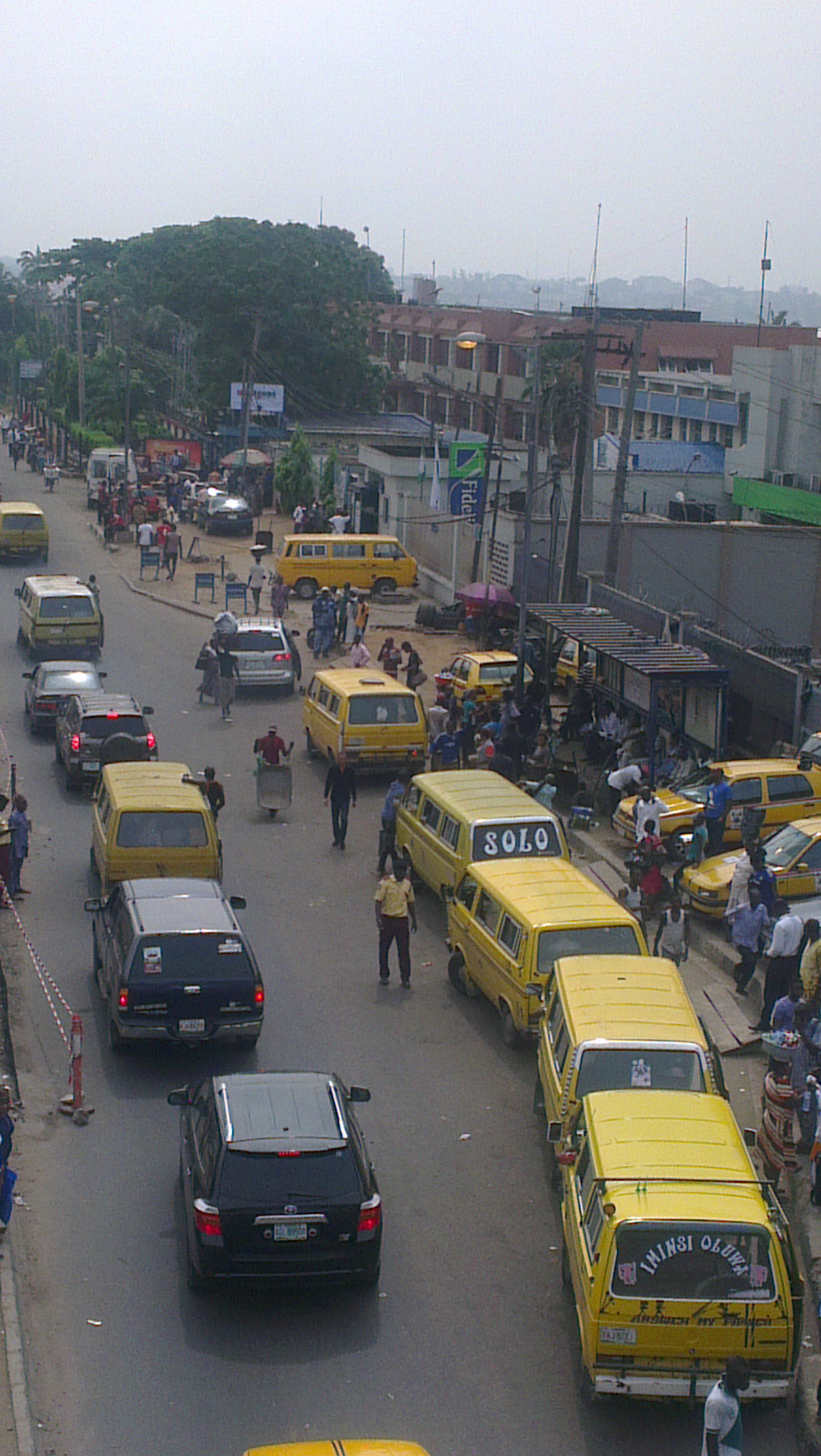
Kombi bus-predecessor of Lagos Yellow Bus

In 1972, the government signed a contract with popular brand Volkswagen of Germany to establish an assembly plant in the country. Equity interest was divided as: Volkswagen AG (40%), German financial institutions (11%), Nigerian government (35%), Lagos State (4%) and Nigerian distributors (10%). The plant was situated along the newly constructed Lagos-Badagry expressway and production began in 1975. The cars where assembled from completely knocked down parts imported from Germany and supplied by Volkswagen. The plant produced the Beetle (1300cc, 1500cc, 1600cc), Audi(100 cd), Golf, Kombi bus, Jetta and Passat. The company's vehicles were popular among the middle class in the country.

The other major passenger vehicle manufacturer is Peugeot Automobile of Nigeria also known as PAN. Like Volkswagen, PAN began production in 1975 with inputs shipped in bits and pieces from abroad. The equity distribution was Peugeot Citroen (40%), Nigerian government (35%), Kaduna State (10%) and Nigerian Industrial Development Bank (5%). At onset, the cars were priced affordably and it became a popular car among the middle class. Production rose from 2,259 in 1975 to 35,000 in 1979 to 48,235 in 1980. The company started with the 504 model and later introduced the 505 in 1980. But when the economy went through a downturn, partly caused by drop in oil prices, newly introduced fiscal policy such as foreign exchange and import controls made it hard for manufacturers to source foreign currency making the cost of production rise.

PAN still maintains a production line assembling car but at a reduced rate from its peak.

=== Commercial trucks ===
In the 1970s, the Nigerian government signed agreements with four foreign manufacturers to invest in assembly plants within the country. One of the agreements berthed Anambra Auto Manufacturing Company also known as ANAMCO, a partnership between the Nigerian federal government and Daimler Benz for the production of trucks. The assembly plant located in Enugu started production in 1980. The company produced MB trucks, ambulances and refuse disposal trucks with an annual capacity of 7,500. Another project was Leyland Nigeria Ltd, a joint venture with Leyland of U.K., the plant is located in Ibadan and at its height it produced trucks and vans for the military, customs, police and the general populace. The Leyland plant also had the ability to produce four wheel drive vehicles. The plant assembled a mixture of five vehicles including the Mitsubishi Canter, Land Rover, Range Rover, The Landmaster and the Albion.

=== Recession and high production costs ===
Commercial vehicle manufacturers wanted government protection from importation to ensure a vibrant car market that will be worthy of sustained investment and that will be able to develop a local supplier industry. However, by 1981, reduction in crude oil prices from the heights of the 1970s led to foreign exchange and import controls and rationing that negatively impacted car production and caused production delays. The assembly plants were capital intensive and depended on importation of parts from abroad but the demand for knocked down parts placed strain on foreign currency market. The government was not generous in providing import licenses to the companies and sometimes shipments were delayed at the ports until proper licenses were obtained. By 1985, all the commercial truck plants were producing below 30% of their capacity and sustaining losses. Towards the end of the 1980s, the government initiated market liberalization measures that allowed more imported cards to compete with locally made vehicles. Volkswagen and PAN increased the cost of their vehicles as a result of a depreciating naira and reduced government subsidy. Volkswagen shifted market focus to selling Kombi buses for commercial transport and corporate cars.

The plants were capital intensive and barely generated profits, equity partners like the government were happy that the plant was running and for the foreign manufacturers, profits came largely from the supply of CKD. Eight years after the plants were opened, the local content target was never met and the plants still imported bits and pieces from abroad. Lack of collaboration between manufacturers and local distributors made difficult the production of parts to meet the manufacturers specifications and life span of parts. Infrastructural deficits such as unstable electric supply increased the cost of producing vehicles and car parts made the locally manufactured vehicles more expensive than its imported counterparts.

Volkswagen went from an annual production of 29,300 in 1981 to less than 1000 in 1989 and in 2005, Nigerian government sold its equity interest to Stallion Group. Facilities at the plant were later used to manufacture Ashok Leyland Falcon buses.

=== Slow patronage from government ===
As soon as production began, demand for vehicles and trucks was heavily influenced by government spending. During a budgetary period when the government did not patronize the manufacturers, production plans were going to be negatively affected. The worst affected by government inconsistency and drop in oil prices were the commercial vehicle plants. While market demand was 36,000 in 1977 by 1981 it had declined to 14,440. Leyland's production was greatly influenced by government spending. Each year, the company followed the expenditure plans of Nigerian customs, police and its military to create a demand influenced production plan. It also depended on Leyland of U.K. for bits and pieces for production. However, in some cases, government agencies began importing their own vans, this made Leyland scale down its operations, and finally the manufacturer stopped sending bits and pieces when production was scaled down and government officials came abroad to negotiate purchase in Leyland U.K. instead of the local manufacturer.

=== 2010s ===
Since the beginning of democratic governance in 1999, the government has been selling its equity stake in the assembly plants. Volkswagen was sold to the Stallion Group, PAN's stake was bought by ASD Motors. PAN, Stallion and local brand Innoson are the major local assembly plants in the country but Stallion mostly assembles partially knocked down parts. Innoson was commissioned in 2010 with an installed capacity of 10,000 vehicles a year, in 2015, the planned production target was 6,000 vehicles. in 2009, PAN started a new production line switching from 406 to 307 models.

== Current situation ==
=== National manufacturers ===
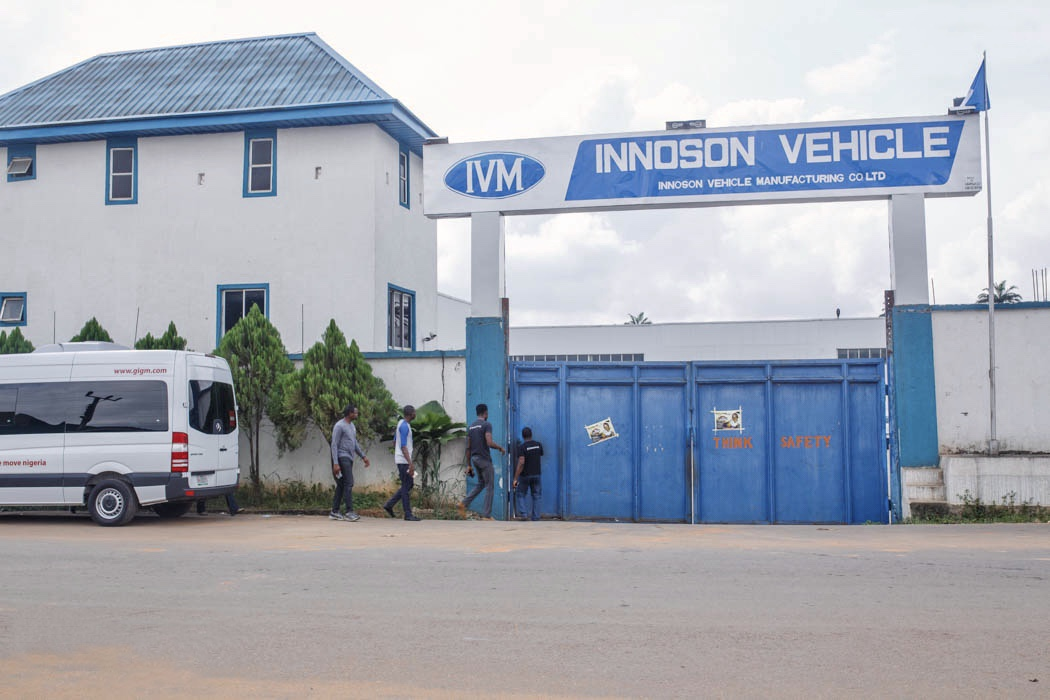
Innoson vehicles in Anambra State

In Sangotedo/Lekki Nord Automobile Limited has an assembly plant, where eight models were currently assembled as of 2022; a production plant in Epe is still under construction.

In Nnewi, Anambra, an automobile assembling company is located: Innoson Vehicle Manufacturing. It assembles mainly buses and SUVs. Since May 2022 Innoson will also assemble "kekes". For this a new production plant has been built.

In Ishara, 30 km north-east of Lagos, Proforce Ltd. is a specialized manufacturer of armoured vehicles. The Nigerian Army through its investment arm, Nigerian Army Welfare Limited by Guarantee NAWLG, acquired 15% shareholding of Proforce Limited.

Proforce has exported its Mine Resistance Armoured Protected Vehicles (MRAPs) and other products to other nations in Africa like Republic of Chad, Rwanda, Ghana, Niger and many others. It was widely reported that Proforce was able to sell an unknown number of armoured vehicles to Belarus in March 2022. This would be the first time Nigeria has exported cars to a European country.

In Maiduguri, Borno State, Phoenix Renewables manufactures solar powered vehicles. Another vehicle manufacturer is Jet Systems Automobile Industries Limited, a manufacturer that produces electric and CNG ambulances, vans and military vehicles. Another company worth highlighting is Electric Motor Vehicles Company of Nigeria Limited, a manufacturer of electric vehicles, which in addition to assembling, produces its own batteries. And if that were not enough, it has a network of charging stations.

=== Foreign car manufacturers ===
A well-known foreign car manufacturer in Kaduna was Peugeot Automobiles Nigeria (PAN). However, in April 2022, Aliko Dangote took over Peugeot its shares and the company name was changed to DPAN. Under the new management PAN/DPAN will mainly assemble Chinese brands Chery and Higer using pre-produced parts. 120 cars per day will be produced in a new production line, Greenfield.

The most productive car manufacturer in 2022 would be the Lagosian Stallion Group, as it assembles 45,000 Volkswagen cars each year.
