= Al-Aziz mosque, Abu Dhabi =

Mosque in Abu Dhabi, United Arab Emirates

Al-Aziz Mosque
- مسجد العزيز

Religion
- Affiliation: Islam

Location
- Municipality: Abu Dhabi
- Country: United Arab Emirates
- Interactive map of Al-Aziz Mosque
- Coordinates: 24.49277°N 54.39601°E

Architecture
- Type: Mosque
- Established: 2015

The Mosque of Al-Aziz (Arabic: مسجد العزيز) is located in Abu Dhabi, United Arab Emirates. It was established in 2015, towards the beginning of Ramadan on the Al Reem Island. The Al- Aziz mosque was opened as a collective of new mosques around Abu Dhabi. It was designed and constructed by the APG, Architecture and Planning Group which is known for other prominent projects in the UAE.

== History ==
The Mosque of Al- Aziz was built due to the rapid expansion of Abu Dhabi, with the intention of introducing innovative concepts and new ideas to Islamic architecture. Additionally, part of its construction was to accommodate the development of Reem Island, it was built to seamlessly fit in with the buildings around it. The mosque's total cost was AED 65 million funded by Hasan Abdullah Ismaik.

== Appearance ==
=== Exterior ===
The mosque has a unique exterior that fits with the modernistic buildings surrounding it. It compromises of a total area of 5100 square meters, with the exterior being provided with a LUCEM (light transmitting concrete) facade with 207 lighting elements of 1800 x 1400 x 44 mm per element. Every element within the facade is unique, combining to create a unified exterior for the Mosque. The exterior is transformed during the evening and night, when the walls' backlights are turned on, and the glowing thuluth calligraphy glows and solidifies itself as a staple of architecture in Abu Dhabi.

The mosque's entrance has a pointed arch with geometric decoration. The minaret is also unique, being completely separated from the mosque, however it matches the same geometric facade that is present on the mosque's exterior. The mosque achieves the glowing exterior by utilizing translucent concrete which works due to the fiber optics within the concrete. Additionally, the concrete was also pigmented in areas where the calligraphy was present in order to blend with the rest of the mosque's facade.

=== Interior ===
The Al-Aziz mosque plan consists of three levels, a basement, a ground floor and a first floor. The ground floor has a large prayer hall that can contain 1,050 people, and the living chambers of the Imam and Muezzin (the person who recites the call to prayer), the basement contains a separate secondary prayer hall with ablutions facilities, used by Muslims for Wudu. The first floor contains the woman's prayer space.

Towards the center of the main prayer hall, there is a large coffered ceiling with multiple geometric overlaid shapes that have opaque glass between each level of the geometric structure, that glow during the night to illuminate the mosque's interior. At the center of the coffered ceiling is a large square chandelier with multiple tiers to it.

=== Minaret ===
The minaret as a structure is a completely separate identity from the mosque, however it follows the same exterior as the mosque, with it being towards the western side of the mosque, inside of the minaret is a staircase that allows the Muezzin to reach the highest tier of the minaret in order to recite the call to prayer.
