= Cutler and Gross =

British luxury eyewear brand

- Type: Private Company
- Industry: Fashion
- Founded: 1969
- Headquarters: London, United Kingdom
- Key people: Graham Cutler & Tony Gross, founders
- Products: Sunglasses and opticals
- Number of employees: 200 est.
- Website: www.cutlerandgross.com

Cutler and Gross is a British luxury eyewear brand, founded in London by opticians Graham Cutler and Tony Gross in 1969. The frames are handmade in the brand's atelier in Italy, and have been worn by the likes of Bono, Madonna, Javier Bardem, Bill Nighy, Rihanna, Lady Gaga, Kate Moss and Manolo Blahnik.

== History ==
The brand was started in London in 1969 by partners Graham Cutler and Tony Gross, who first met at Northampton College while studying optometry in the early 1960s. They opened their first optician's office in Knightsbridge in 1971, stocking handmade bespoke frames, and soon won recognition for pioneering the concept of fashionable eyewear.

Their collection developed from producing only sunglasses, to currently incorporating optical designs for prescription lenses. Their products are designed to be unisex, for men, and women. It is made to complement all lifestyles and face shapes.

== Boutiques ==
As well as their flagship boutique in London's Knightsbridge district, Cutler and Gross have stores in Spitalfields, Bath, Toronto, and New York.

== Fashion ==
Cutler and Gross eyewear is designed and made in the brand's factory in Domegge di Cadore, Italy.

The company's eyewear has been worn on catwalks and in magazines, including Vogue, Glamour, Elle, Grazia, Marie Claire, Dazed & Confused, GQ, Vanity Fair, Esquire, The Financial Times, and Forbes.

=== Film and television ===
Cutler and Gross sunglasses and opticals have been a mainstay across film and television. Notable features include Julia Roberts in Notting Hill, Colin Firth & Samuel L. Jackson in Kingsman: The Secret Service, Daniel Craig in Knives Out 2 and Michael Fassbender in The Counsellor.

=== Projects ===
In 2008 Cutler and Gross showed their new and past collections at Selfridges London. In 2009, Cutler and Gross was presented with the award for Best Accessory, by HRH Princess Royal at the UK Fashion Export Awards. In 2010, Cutler and Gross eyewear was on the front cover of Graham Pullin's book Design Meets Disability. The book was dedicated to Graham Cutler and Tony Gross. 2011 marked the launch of their bi-annual magazine.

=== On the catwalk ===
Cutler and Gross eyewear has been an accessory in catwalk collections for many designers over the past few decades. Some recent collaborations include:

- 2009: Cutler and Gross eyewear features on the catwalks of Erdem, Giles Deacon, Jasmine de Milo, Twenty8Twelve, Jenny Packham, Richard Nichol and Osman Yousefzada.
- 2010 A/W Fashion Weeks: Their eyewear featured on the catwalks of Daks, Osman Yousefzada and b Store.
- 2011 S/S Fashion Weeks: At Paris Fashion Week, they feature the catwalks of Emanuel Ungaro, Cacharel and Maison Martin Margiela. In London Fashion Week, Cutler and Gross feature in the catwalk shows of Holly Fulton, Richard Nicoll and Twenty8Twelve. Additionally, in New York Fashion Week, Cutler and Gross made an appearance on the catwalk of Tim Hamilton.
- 2011 A/W Fashion Weeks: In London Fashion Week, Cutler and Gross featured on the catwalks of Holly Fulton and Meadham Kirchhoff. During New York Fashion Week, Cutler and Gross appeared on the catwalk show of Timo Weiland.

=== Collaborations ===
Cutler and Gross has collaborated with a range of fashion labels to create limited edition frames over the years. Recent collaborations include:

- The Great Frog: Cutler and Gross are set to launch their third collaboration with British rock'n'roll jeweller The Great Frog in September 2024. The sunglasses and glasses are handcrafted in Cutler and Gross's Italian factory and gilded with The Great Frog's signature metalwork in Sterling Silver and 24 carat gold. Iggy Pop was the face of the original collection campaign, followed by model Georgia May Jagger.
- Erdem: In 2009 Cutler and Gross collaborated with Canadian designer Erdem (2005 Fashion Fringe winner) to create a collection of sunglasses for the Spring/Summer 2010 collection. The collection was inspired by an image of a Japanese fisherwoman dressed in brightly printed shorts charging out from the waves across black sand. The glasses are a juxtaposition of vibrant colour pops with darker backgrounds on a 1960s style round frame. The sunglasses were created in black, black lace, tortoise, neutral stone and Erdem's customised Kyoto print.
- Maison Margiela: In 2010 Cutler and Gross teamed up with avant-garde French fashion label Maison Margiela. The collection of sunglasses featured two lines, 'Wrong Size' and 'Anatomic', both appearing in acetate and metal varieties. The 'Wrong Size' line consists of classic Cutler and Gross aviator-style frames which are deconstructed then reconstructed with ill-fitting lenses creating a unique range of sunglasses. The 'Anatomic' line consisted of large futuristic, wraparounds sunglasses that are designed wrap around the wearer in a custom fit.
- Giles Deacon: In 2010 Cutler and Gross collaborated with Giles Deacon to create a range of retro inspired 'Cats Eye' sunglasses. Mirrored lenses added a modern twist to the retro style.
- Comme Des Garcons: 2009 saw the second collaboration of Cutler and Gross with Comme Des Garcons. The 'Future of Black' limited edition collection consisted of three designs, all fitted with extra dark grey tinted lenses to create a totally black look. The glasses came inside a unique glasses case covered in Comme des Garcons' own fabric.
- Mulberry: In 2008, Cutler and Gross collaborated with British accessories giant Mulberry. The collection showcased a small history from the archives of Cutler and Gross, dating back from the bold block colours of the early 1980s to rock & roll style of the 1990s.
- Thomas Tait.
- Alberta Ferretti.
- Martyn Bal.
- Victoria Beckham: Cutler and Gross works with the celebrity designer to create an eyewear line under her own moniker.
- Kingsman: The Secret Service.

== See also ==
- Alexander Daas
