= Depa Group =

Construction and manufacturing firm

Depa Plc
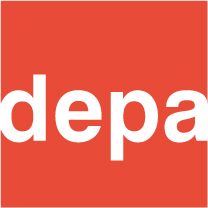
- Company type: Public limited company
- Industry: Construction; Interior Fit-Out; Manufacturing
- Predecessor: Arabtec Hotel Interiors; Depa Interiors
- Founded: 1996 (30 years ago)
- Founder: Riad Kamal; Chris Holmes; Mohannad Sweid
- Headquarters: Dubai, United Arab Emirates
- Area served: Middle East; Africa; Asia; Europe
- Revenue: ▼1,375.8 million AED (2019)
- Number of employees: 6,500
- Website: depa.com

Depa PLC is a publicly listed interior construction and manufacturing firm headquartered in Dubai, UAE. Established in 1996 and listed on the Nasdaq Dubai. The firm provides interior construction services and joinery manufacturing for construction contractors in Africa, Asia and Europe. Depa Group consists of four subsidiaries: Depa Interiors, Deco Group, Design Studio Group, and Vedder.

== History ==
Depa Group was established as Arabtec Hotel Interiors in 1996 by founding members Riad Kamal, Chris Holmes and Mohannad Sweid. In 1997, the company completed its first project - the Al Bustan Rotana Hotel in Dubai, UAE. In the same year, the company also provided interior construction works on the Jumeirah Beach Hotel, Dubai.

Depa provided interior works for the Al Bustan Rotana Hotel & Burj Al Arab, both in Dubai, in 1997 and 1999 respectively. In the same year, Depa Hotel Interiors (Egypt) was established and the company delivered the Four Seasons Nile Plaza Hotel in Cairo.

=== 2000 - 2010 ===
In 2000, Depa established a subsidiary called Pino Meroni Yacht Interiors. In 2001, Depa Abu Dhabi completed its first contract - the ADWEA headquarters. In 2003, Depa Interiors completed the interior works for the Grand Hyatt Hotel Dubai.

Depa provided interior works the Museum of Islamic Art, Doha Qatar, designed by architect I.M.Pei.

In 2005, Depa Abu Dhabi provided interior works for the Emirates Palace hotel. In the same year, Depa formed a joint venture with Mivan, named Mivan Depa, and provided interior works for the Museum of Islamic Art in Doha, Qatar, designed by architect I. M. Pei.

In 2006, Depa provided interior works for the Dubai Festival City district including InterContinental Hotel, Crown Plaza Hotel, Dubai Festival City Convention Centre, and Harbour Plaza Hotel. In the same year, Depa also established operations in Morocco, Sudan, Qatar, India, and formed joint venture (later to become a wholly owned subsidiary) Depa Albarakah to procure and install gypsum; and acquired Abu Dhabi-based woodworking firm Eldiar. In the same year, Depa completed the interior fit-out of the Shoreline Apartments complex on the Palm Jumeirah, Dubai. In 2006, the company also acquired Deco Emirates, Dragoni International, Royal Thai Carpets and Design Studio, and a 22.2 per cent stake in JWICO.

In 2007, Depa established joint ventures with JWICO, The Parker Company, and Decolight, in Jordan; and set up operations in Saudi Arabia. In Morocco, DepaMar provided interior works on the Mazagan Beach and Gold Resort in El Jedida. Depa Qatar secured the contract to fit-out the Commercial Bank of Qatar’s headquarters in Doha. In 2007, Depa and German interior contractor Lindner Group formed the Lindner Depa Interiors joint venture, which in 2008, was awarded contracts to fit-out 11 Green Line stations and 13 Red Line stations for the Dubai Metro.

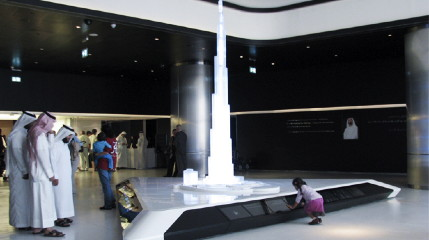
In 2008, Depa began work on the interior fit-out of the Burj Khalifa (originally named Burj Dubai), the world's tallest building.

In 2008, Depa, Deco, Depa Abu Dhabi, and Mivan Depa all provided interior work for the Atlantis, The Palm Hotel Dubai. 2008 was also the year Depa Interiors began work on the interior fit-out of the Burj Khalifa (originally named Burj Dubai), the world's tallest building. Depa also completed the fit-out of Al Futtaim's new management offices in Festival Tower, Dubai. In the same year, Depa and Design Studio formed the joint venture DDS, and were awarded the fit-out of Marina Bay Sands Singapore. Later that year, DDS became a wholly owned subsidiary, and was incorporated in Singapore. Additionally, Depa acquired yacht interior fit-out firm Vedder, in Germany. Also in 2008, Depa listed on the Nasdaq Dubai, and the London Stock Exchange. In 2009, Depa Abu Dhabi and Mivan Depa delivered works for Ferrari World on Yas Island, Abu Dhabi, and completed work on five Yas Island hotels. In Dubai, Depa completed the fit-out of the Palazzo Versace.

=== 2010-2015 ===
In 2010, Depa acquired UAE stone and marble suppliers, Carrara Mid-East, and entered the Angolan market securing a contract for the interior fit-out of the InterContinental Hotel in Luanda.

Projects commenced in 2011 included: the Fairmont Flame Tower project in Baku, Azerbaijan; Zaha Hadid Architects project the King Abdullah Petroleum Studies and Research Center in Riyadh, Saudi Arabia; IPIC Square in Abu Dhabi; and the Mazagan Villa project in Morocco. In 2011, Deco Group provided fit-out works for Louis Vuitton in Bahrain, Morocco, the UAE, Saudi Arabia, Kuwait, and Oman.

In 2012, Arabtec Holdings acquired a stake in Depa and became the Group's largest shareholder. Also in 2012, Depa Abu Dhabi delivered fit-out works for the Hilton Hotel Abu Dhabi; and Depa Qatar completed work on the Radisson Blu Hotel, Doha Qatar. As part of a restructure in 2012, the Depa Mivan division of Depa was merged with the main company business. Also in 2012, Deco Group began work on several luxury retail outlets at Dubai Mall, including Dior, Dolce & Gabbana, Fendi, Chanel, and Louis Vuitton.

In 2013, co-founder Mohannad Sweid resigned from his role as chief executive officer. Depa completed the interior fit-out of the Conrad Hotel Dubai; and DepaMar began work on the Khalifa Bin Zayed Specialized Hospital in Casablanca, Morocco. In the same year, Depa Abu Dhabi delivered the fit-out of the interior of the Presidential Palace in Abu Dhabi; and Depa Group acquired German yacht and aircraft fit-out firm Loher.

In 2014, Depa delivered the interior fit-out of the Fairmont Hotel, Abu Dhabi; and Depa India completed work on the Mumbai International Airport (known as Chhatrapati Shivaji International Airport).

=== 2015 - Depa Group ===
Depa began work on the Emerald Palace Kempinski Hotel, and the Novotel World Trade Centre Hotels in Dubai, in 2015. Depa Group completed 37 projects in 2015, including hospitality projects for Hyatt, Novotel, Sheraton, and Ritz Carlton hotels. It also completed retail fit-outs for Dior, Louis Vuitton, D&G, Michael Kors, and Pottery Barn. Also in 2015, Depa delivered interior works construction work contracts for the Dubai Opera House, the Madinat Jumeirah extension, and Nikki Beach Resort.

In 2016, current Group CEO Hamish Tyrwhitt joined Depa and restructured the Group, with Depa Group being established as a strategic management company.

In 2017, AL Futtaim Capital became Depa Group's largest shareholder. Retail firm Deco Group completed the Robinsons Department Store, in Dubai. Deco Group also began the fit-out of several high end retail outlets in the new Dubai Mall fashion avenue extension.

== Current operations ==
The current Group Chief Executive Officer is Kevin Lewis. The former Group Chief Executive Officer was Hamish Tyrwhitt. Upon taking up his role as chief executive officer, Tyrwhitt announced a restructuring of the business, which saw Depa Group established as a strategic management company overseeing the operations of the reorganised group of four key business units (Depa Interiors, Deco Group, Design Studio and Vedder). In 2017, Mohamed Al Mehairi was appointed Chairman of the Depa Limited Board, following the resignation of Ibrahim Belselah. Depa Group increased its profit in H1 2017, and paid its first dividend since 2010 in Q3 2017.

Depa delisted on the London Stock Exchange in 2018, citing a negligible volume of global depository receipts.
