= Hasan Abdullah Ismaik =

Emirati businessman

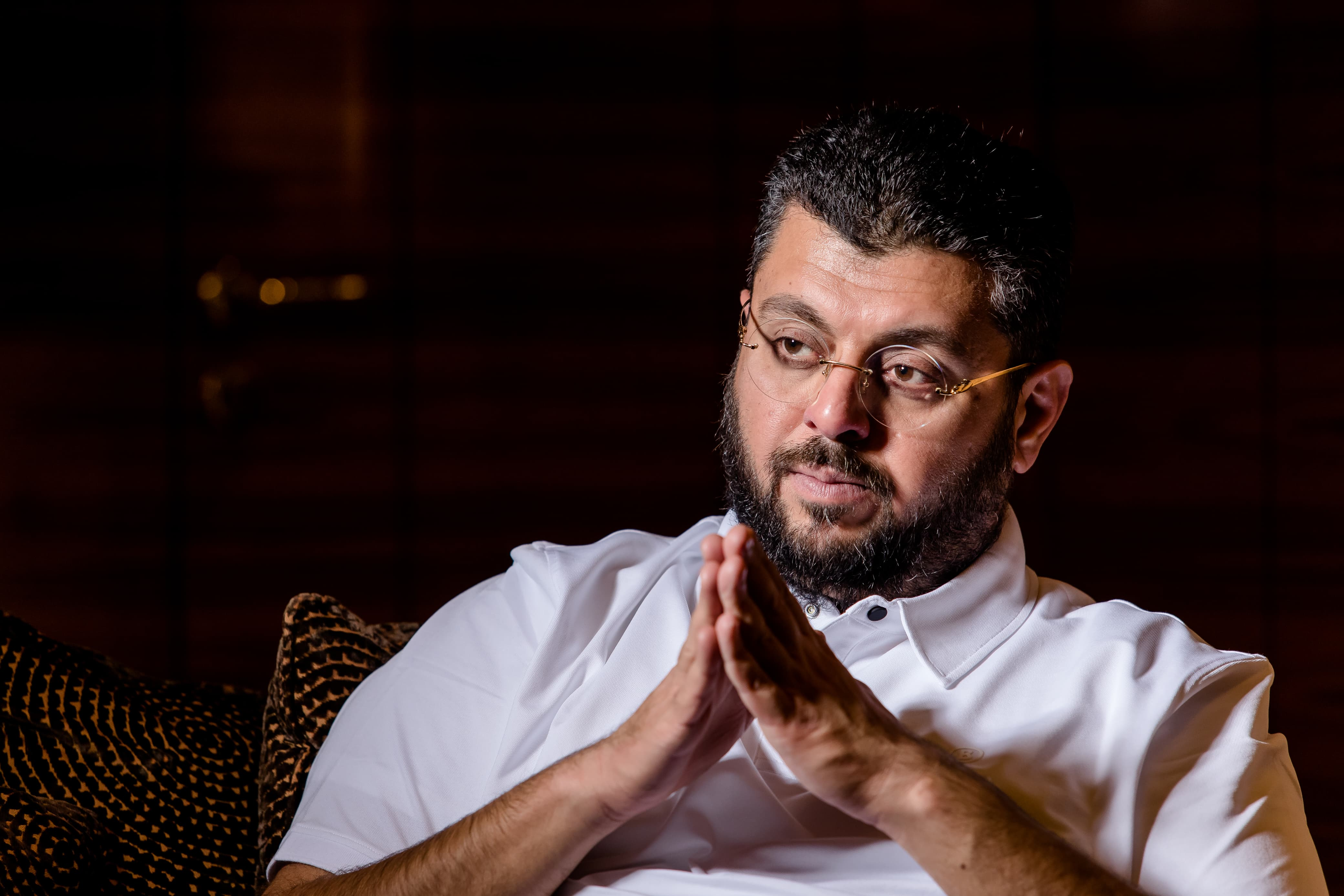
- Born: August 14, 1977 (age 49); Kuwait
- Occupations: Writer, entrepreneur and philanthropist
- Website: hamic.com

Hasan Abdullah Ismaik (Arabic: حسن عبدالله إسميك) is an Emirati businessman and Chairman of Hasan Abdullah Mohammed Ismail Capital (HAMIC Group), a UAE-based group of investment companies founded by Ismaik in 2006. He owns HAMIC Group, a private investment company in the United Arab Emirates with a diversified investment portfolio that includes projects worth US$4 billion. He is the Chairman of Al-Ashmal Real-Estate Investment Co. in Jordan; and chairman of publicly listed Masaken for Land and Industrial Development Projects (Masaken Capital). In 2014, Forbes Magazine listed Ismaik as the third-youngest billionaire in the Middle East.

== Early life and education ==
Ismaik was born in Kuwait in 1977 and holds a BA in Business Administration from Al-Mustansiriyah University in Baghdad.

Ismaik launched his career as a real estate entrepreneur in Jordan, Saudi Arabia and the United Arab Emirates, with a specific interest in the oil and gas sectors. Following the introduction of the freehold property law that sparked the real estate boom in Dubai, he transferred his business focus to the UAE market where he continued to gain commercial achievements.

== Investments ==
He pushed plans to diversify his investment portfolio and explored new investment and asset acquisition opportunities in industries as diverse as energy, real estate, construction, transportation, retail and architectural design services. In 2006, Ismaik founded HAMIC Group, an Abu Dhabi-based group of investment companies. In addition to HAMIC Group, Ismaik has commercial interest in a wide range of industries including real estate, retail, and architectural design services, among others, across the United Arab Emirates, GCC Europe and the Middle East.

HAMIC Group includes the following subsidiary companies:

- Marya Investments: A UAE-based private investment company that has interest in a wide range of industries spanning real estate, healthcare, education and general investments. Its flagship projects include Shams One in Dubai Marina and MARYA Down Town – Dubai; the latter comprises four central landmark towers overlooking the marina and the Burj Khalifa, along with a range of residential and serviced apartments.
- SOHO: A company specializing in the retail sector, including brands in the fashion and food industries.
- HAMG General Trading: A company specializing in providing business solutions across regional and global markets.
- Marya Development: A real estate development company headquartered in Abu Dhabi, UAE and known for its residential and mixed-use projects.

=== Retail sector ===
Al Manara International Jewellery: Successfully Exited, one of the retailers of watches and jewellery in the United Arab Emirates. Established in 1973, Al Manara International Jewellery was acquired by HAMG in partnership with Ahmed Seddiqi & Sons. It boasts the largest portfolio of finest Swiss watch and jewellery brands across a network of fourteen luxury boutiques in Abu Dhabi and Al Ain. Having built a reputation as one of Abu Dhabi's premier retailers of luxury watches and jewellery, Al Manara operates a broad range of renowned brands including Patek Philippe, Breitling, Chopard, Audemars Piguet, Piaget, Dior, Baume & Mercier, Hublot, and Tag Heuer. The company's revenues doubled, and expanded its operations by opening 12 branches in Abu Dhabi.

=== Other subsidiaries ===
- TSV 1860 Munich Ismaik bought 60 percent of the TSV 1860 Munich, a German fourth division football club, partly owned by the UAE-based private investment company HAMG. The club was established on 17 May 1860 following a merger with a number of local clubs.
- LI Architects: A UAE-based design consultancy for interior design, architecture, transport and product design, landscape design, structural engineering, lighting design, MEP service design, brand development and graphics.
- First Capital Group Holding Limited: First Capital is a general investment company based out of Dubai International Financial Center "DIFC".
- Arabtec Holdings: In 2013, Ismaik was appointed as CEO of Arabtec Holdings, the largest construction company in the GCC, which had a total market capitalization of nearly US$6.82 billion at that time. He served as the managing director and CEO of Arabtec Holdings and Chairman of Arabtec Constructions. In June 2014, Ismaik became the single largest investor in Arabtec Holdings after increasing his personal shareholding in the company to 28.84 percent, putting his net worth at AED 8 billion in shares at that time. Under his leadership, Arabtec Holdings embarked on a new strategy toward incremental growth. He spearheaded the overhauling of the construction company's business, driving growth by targeting new sectors. This led to the consolidation and consequent strengthening of the firm's operations, via acquisitions, joint ventures and strategic alliances across oil, gas, energy and infrastructure sectors in the Middle East and North Africa. During his tenure at Arabtec, Ismaik formed a joint venture with South Korea’s Samsung Engineering, and signed a similar agreement with GS Engineering & Construction, one of the largest multi-faceted companies in South Korea to undertake heavy civil infrastructure work in the Middle East and North Africa.

In June 2013, the board of directors of Depa Limited, one of the world's leading interior contracting companies, appointed Ismaik as its new chairman. His appointment followed a strong performance by the company across its diverse and robust project catalogue in the first quarter of the year, when the company's revenue increased by 18 percent to AED446 million. In March 2014, he signed an MOU with the Egyptian armed forces to build one million houses in Egypt. The project, one of the biggest in the region, aimed to provide housing for lower income individuals.

- Masaken Capital: Ismaik is the chairman of publicly listed Masaken for Land and Industrial Development Projects (Masaken Capital), an Amman-based real estate firm founded in 2008. He acquired 37 percent of the company's capital in August 2015. Deemed one of the largest investments in the Jordanian stock market, the acquisition was tasked with supporting the Jordanian economy through promoting investments and providing job opportunities for the Jordanian workforce, in line with the vision and directives of His Majesty King Abdullah II.

The company's key investments in Jordan include the Al-Haytham commercial complex, Masaken Academy, in addition to land ownership in various regions throughout the kingdom.

== Acquisition of shares of TSV 1860 Munich ==
In June 2011, Ismaik bought 60 percent, an investment of €18 million ($25.8 million) of TSV 1860 Munich, a German sports club based in Munich that plays in the Regionalliga Bayern. Becoming the first Arab to acquire shares of a German football club, Ismaik claimed that his aim was to safeguard the survival of the club that was one of the founding members of the German national Bundesliga. Due to DFL regulations, Ismaik only has 49 percent of the voting rights; the additional shares are without voting rights.

Ismaik commented on the acquisition:

TSV 1860 has a great tradition and identity that ought to be preserved and supported. The club has enormous potential and a truly great and passionate fan base. I will do everything to bring TSV 1860 back into the profit zone."

— Arabian Business

In June 2026, 1860 failed to receive a license from the DFB to compete in 3. Liga for the 2026-27 season. The club claimed that this was due to Ismaik failing to fulfill a financing commitment.

== Philanthropy ==
Ismaik built a number of places of worship in Jordan and the Emirates, most notably the Al-Aziz Mosque in Reem Island, Abu Dhabi, and the Al-Kareem Mosque in Abu Dhabi opposite the Emirates Palace. Both mosques are prominent landmarks in Abu Dhabi. Through the Al-Baraka Charitable Society, which he founded, and in cooperation with the Zakat Fund and the Red Crescent, Ismaik supports the poor and needy in Jordan, in addition to educating a large number of high-achieving students from underprivileged families and sponsoring orphans in Jordan and other countries in the Middle East.

== Awards and recognitions ==
- Forbes Magazine listed Ismaik as the third-youngest billionaire in the Middle East in 2014.
- Ismaik was awarded first place in Construction Week's Power 100 in 2013. The list features individuals who influence and guide the GCC's construction industry.
- In 2014, MEED business intelligence magazine listed him as one of the 12 most influential personalities on the Middle East economic scene.
