= Paul Surridge =

British fashion designer

Paul Surridge is a British fashion designer and art director.

== Early life ==
Surridge was born on 18 June 1974 in Hertfordshire, England. He was interested in architecture and photography until he discovered fashion on a television program called The Clothes Show. He studied at the Central Saint Martins College of Art in London where he obtained bachelor's degrees in fashion design and marketing in 1997.

== Career ==
After graduating, Surridge became an assistant of Neil Barrett, a menswear designer at Prada, and he helped Barrett create Prada's first menswear series. Shortly after, Surridge was employed by Ruffo, serving as the designer and creative consultant of womenswear and menswear series. After that, he was invited to New York by Jigsaw and Bailey Menswear to work as a consultant. After his move to New York, Surridge quickly became the design director of Calvin Klein menswear.

He returned to Europe in early 2001 and continued to serve as a creative director for Ruffo. The designer then collaborated with Acne Studios, acting as a creative advisor for the menswear collections. In 2003, he started a stint at Burberry, working as senior designer of menswear along with Christopher Bailey, until 2008. He became head menswear designer at Jil Sander while it was under Raf Simons, and between 2011 and 2014 was made creative director at Z Zegna.

On 10 May 2017, Surridge replaced Peter Dundas as the head of design at Roberto Cavalli. He made his debut at Cavalli showing his first collection for Spring/Summer 2018, which received critical acclaim. During his tenure, Surridge was responsible for the Roberto Cavalli little sister line, Just Cavalli, as well as a children's collection.

In March 2019, the designer announced on his personal Instagram account that he was to leave Cavalli.

== Collections ==
- Z Zegna Fall/Winter 2012 Collection
- Z Zegna Spring/Summer 2013 Collection
- Z Zegna Fall/Winter 2013 Collection
- Z Zegna Spring/Summer 2014 Collection
- Z Zegna Fall/Winter 2014 Collection
- Z Zegna Menswear Spring/Summer 2015 Menswear Collection
- Roberto Cavalli Spring/Summer 2018 Womenswear Collection
- Roberto Cavalli Autumn/Winter 2018 Womenswear Collection
- Roberto Cavalli Fall 2018 Collection
- Roberto Cavalli Spring/Summer 2019 Womenswear Collection
- Roberto Cavalli Spring/Summer 2019 Menswear Collection
