= Martyn Bal =

Dutch fashion designer

- Education: Royal College Of Art
- Labels: Dior Homme; Burberry; Versace; Maison Martin Margiela; Roberto Cavalli
- Awards: Mila Schön Design and concept award (1999)

Martyn Bal is a Dutch fashion designer. He has worked with Hedi Slimane at Dior Homme, Donatella Versace, Christopher Bailey at Burberry and Roberto Cavalli, and collaborated among many others, with Moncler, Edward Enninful, Cutler and Gross and Marc Quinn.

== Early life and education ==
Martyn Bal was born in The Netherlands. Before discovering fashion, Bal briefly studied architecture. Bal was a teen apprentice to Dirk Bikkembergs (Antwerp six). Not having had any formal design education, Bal went on to study fashion design at the Royal College Of Art in London. Bal graduated in 2000 with a Master of Arts degree in menswear.

== Career ==
After graduation in 2000, Bal was immediately hired to assist Hedi Slimane at Dior Homme. He went on to direct the men's design studio at Burberry, working closely with Christopher Bailey, and design collections for Maison Martin Margiela.

In 2009 Bal launched his own line of menswear, featuring transgender model and actor Andreja Pejić and then rising Swedish popstar Erik Hassle. During this period Bal also developed an exclusive handcrafted eyewear range named 'Wowzers' with Cutler and Gross.

From 2010 Bal was in charge of the men's design studio at Versace, reporting directly to Donatella Versace. Here he collaborated with Edward Enninful (currently of British Vogue) and Joe McKenna on the styling of the menswear shows.

From February 2013 Martyn Bal was appointed Men's Style and Design Director at Roberto Cavalli. Martyn Bal was reporting directly to Roberto Cavalli and was in charge of all menswear style and design, including accessories and licensees.

After successfully repositioning the menswear brand, Bal left his position at Roberto Cavalli in June 2015, after Italian private equity firm Clessidra acquired a 90% stake of the Roberto Cavalli group. Since then Martyn Bal has continues to work on projects as a senior style and design consultant and most recently collaborated with New York based denim and leather brand BLK DNM, originally founded by Johan Lindeberg. Here Bal worked on launching an all made in Italy premium denim and outerwear capsule for the brand. He also collaborated with renowned contemporary artist Marc Quinn

== Style | Celebrity ==
Bal's collection are known for its romanticism and its slick precision, tinged with duality and bold attitude. His designs have been featured on magazine covers and worn by celebrities including David Bowie, Mick Jagger, Prince, Duran Duran, Alex Turner, Steven Tyler, Joe Perry, Tinie Tempah, Nicki Minaj, Kanye West, Lewis Hamilton, Mr Hudson, The Kooks, Nicholas Hoult, Lu Yi, Rupert Penry-Jones, Fabio Novembre, among others.
