= Trump International Golf Club, Dubai =

Golf facility

Coordinates: 25°1′24″N 55°15′12″E

Trump International Golf Club
- Interactive map of Trump International Golf Club

Club information
- Location: Dubai, United Arab Emirates
- Owner: DAMAC Properties

The Trump International Golf Club in Dubai is owned by DAMAC Properties and managed and operated in partnership with the Trump Organization. It was inaugurated in 2017 by Eric Trump and Donald Trump Jr.

The course covers an area of 7,205 yards by 71. Its architect is Gil Hanse.

In 2023, the fully floodlit back-nine holes of this club was inaugurated with an invitational nine-hole tournament. UAE golf industry, media and other TIGC guests were invited to participate.

== See also ==
- List of things named after Donald Trump
