= DAMAC Residenze =

- Location within United Arab Emirates

General information
- Status: Complete
- Type: Residential
- Coordinates: 25°05′14.06″N 55°08′44.41″E
- Groundbreaking: 15 September 2006
- Construction started: 24 March 2011
- Opening: 23 July 2018

Height
- Roof: 335 m (1,099 ft)

Technical details
- Floor count: 85, plus 5 basement floors
- Floor area: 114,000 m^{2} (1,227,086 sq ft)

Design and construction
- Architect: Aedas
- Developer: DAMAC Properties

DAMAC Residenze, formerly named DAMAC Heights and Ocean Heights 2, is an 85-storey, 335 m (1,099 ft), supertall skyscraper in Dubai Marina, Dubai. It is the second supertall project by DAMAC Properties, the first being Ocean Heights, which is also located in Dubai Marina. The building overlooks the Palm Jumeirah.

As of 2022, DAMAC Residenze is the 13th-tallest building in Dubai and the 12th-tallest residential building in the world.

== Architecture and design ==
Damac Residenze is located in the upper part of the marina, the most populated district of Dubai Marina containing nine skyscrapers and about 10 between 200m and 300m. The design incorporates elements that increase the field of view, giving the impression of a larger space between the DAMAC and the other towers. According to the architects Aedas, the curvature of the tower is crucial to provide views for the largest number of apartments possible.

The tower was planned to be 420 m (1,378 ft) high, but its height was reduced to 335 m (1,099 ft) in February 2013.

== History ==
In February 2013, the foundation work of DAMAC Residenze was in progress, while the piling had already been completed.

DAMAC Heights is a 335-meter-tall skyscraper in Dubai

The building was topped out in November 2015. It was then opened in July 2018.

== See also ==
- DAMAC Properties
- List of tallest buildings in Dubai
- List of tallest buildings in the United Arab Emirates
- List of tallest residential buildings
