= Damak-e Aliabad =

Damak-e Aliabad دامك علي اباد
- Village
- Location within Iran
- Coordinates: 31°39′16″N 53°50′19″E
- Country: Iran
- Province: Yazd
- County: Taft
- Bakhsh: Central
- Rural District: Aliabad

Population (2006)
  - Total: 114
- Time zone: UTC+3:30 (IRST)
  - Summer (DST): UTC+4:30 (IRDT)

Damak-e Aliabad (Persian: دامك علي اباد, also Romanized as Dāmak-e ‘Alīābād; also known as Dāmak and Dāmok) is a village in Aliabad Rural District, in the Central District of Taft County, Yazd Province, Iran. At the 2006 census, its population was 114, in 36 families.
