= Himalaya Higher Secondary School, Damak, Jhapa =

HSS,Damak,Jhapa,Nepal

Coordinates: 26.6763°N 87.6953°E

Himalaya Secondary School (Nepali: हिमालय माध्यमिक विद्यालय) also known as Himabi, is an English medium school in Damak, Nepal. It is situated at Damak-2. This secondary school was founded in 2012 B.S (1956 A.D). It is the oldest school in the history of current Damak Municipality. It is a school with classes up to 12 and carries out different higher secondary level programs on Science, Humanities, Education and Management. Dorna Bahadur Shresta is current Principal of HSS. The school is currently installing "Digital Boards" and cameras in each classes.

Himalaya Higher Secondary School also offers the Computer Engineering(High-School, 9-12th grade course) in school level and is the only few schools to provide so in Jhapa District along with Shree Saraswati Secondary School , Damak-9, Jhapa and Janata Ma Vi, This course is affiliated from National Examination Board (NEB).

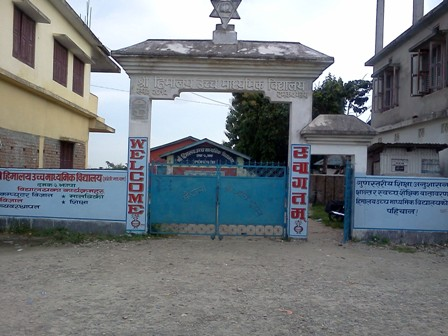
Himalaya Higher Secondary School from front

== Academic Offerings ==
1. Secondary level and primary level schooling in English.
2. Computer Engineering in School
3. Management(With/Without computer science)
4. Science(Without computer science)
4. Education Faculty
5. Humanities

== Donors ==
SN	Donor Agencies and personalities	Contribution
1	Santa Bir Lama	RCC building with a tinned roof
2	Dhan Bdr Shrestha	roomed RRC building
3	Damak Municipality	Rs 10,000 to build four rooms for shops 13 truck raw material for Himalaya Hall
4	Bhukampa Pidit Bidhyalaya Sahayog Aayojana	3 blocks(each containing two room) school bore the expense of brick, sand and cement
5	UNHCR	RCC building with tinned roof (2 rooms) -Toilet -Harmonium, steel rack, and some Books
6	Secondary Education Development Program	Science Lab with Microscope
7	Ban Upabhokta Samiti	Rs 10,000 to make furniture
8	Nepal redcross damak Branch	Water tank and taps for drinking water
9	Damak jecise	Water tank and taps for drinking water
10	Lions Club	400 pieces books for school library
11	Nepal RedCross	2300 sisau Plants and spiked wire to protect eh Himalaya Ban Batika
12	Bal Bahadur Limbu	1 piece Rack
13	Dhan Bdr Shrestha	NRs, 2 lakhs
14	Rituraj Bhandari	NRs, 1 lakhs
15	Lok Kumari Subba	NRs. 2 lakhs 23 thousand
16	Jay Shrestha	NRs. 2 lakhs
17	Badri Kumar Shah	NRs. 22 thousand 2 hundred 22
18	Sushil Agrawal	Almirah(for montesary class)
19	Mina Shrestha	Almirah (for Science lab)
20	Ronish Ghimire	Almirah(for Science lab)
21	Laxman Shrestha	Chemistry lab table
