= Alexander Daas =

US eyewear designer

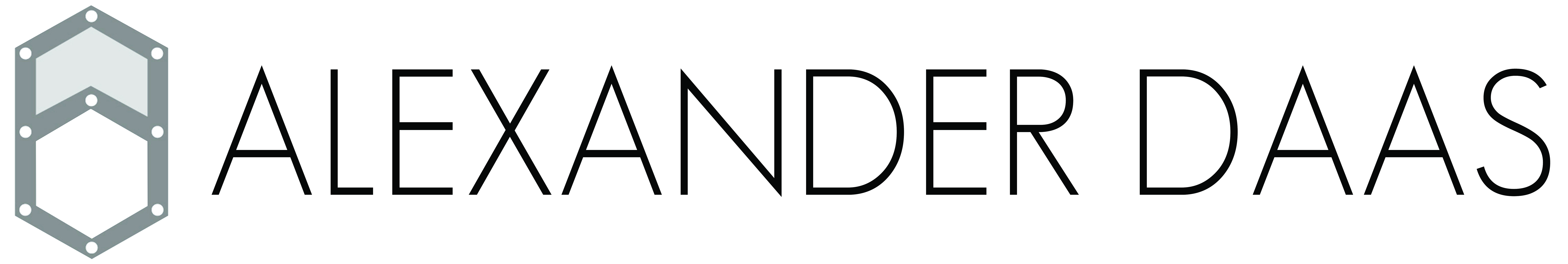
- Company type: Private
- Industry: Eyewear
- Founder: Alex Feldman
- Products: Glasses; Sunglasses; Prescription lenses; Contact lenses
- Services: Opticianry; Eye exams
- Website: AlexanderDaas.com

Alexander Daas is an American luxury eyewear brand and retailer of prescription reading glasses, sunglasses, and contact lenses, based in California. It also offers eye exams by independent optometrists on-site.

== History ==
Alexander Daas was started in San Francisco in 2010 and is currently headquartered in San Diego, United States. Originally, the brand specialized in small PD (pupillary distance) eyewear for narrow faces but has since expanded into eyewear for all face shapes and sizes.

The brand and company were founded by Alex Feldman, an American eyewear designer, stylist, and optician.

== Locations ==
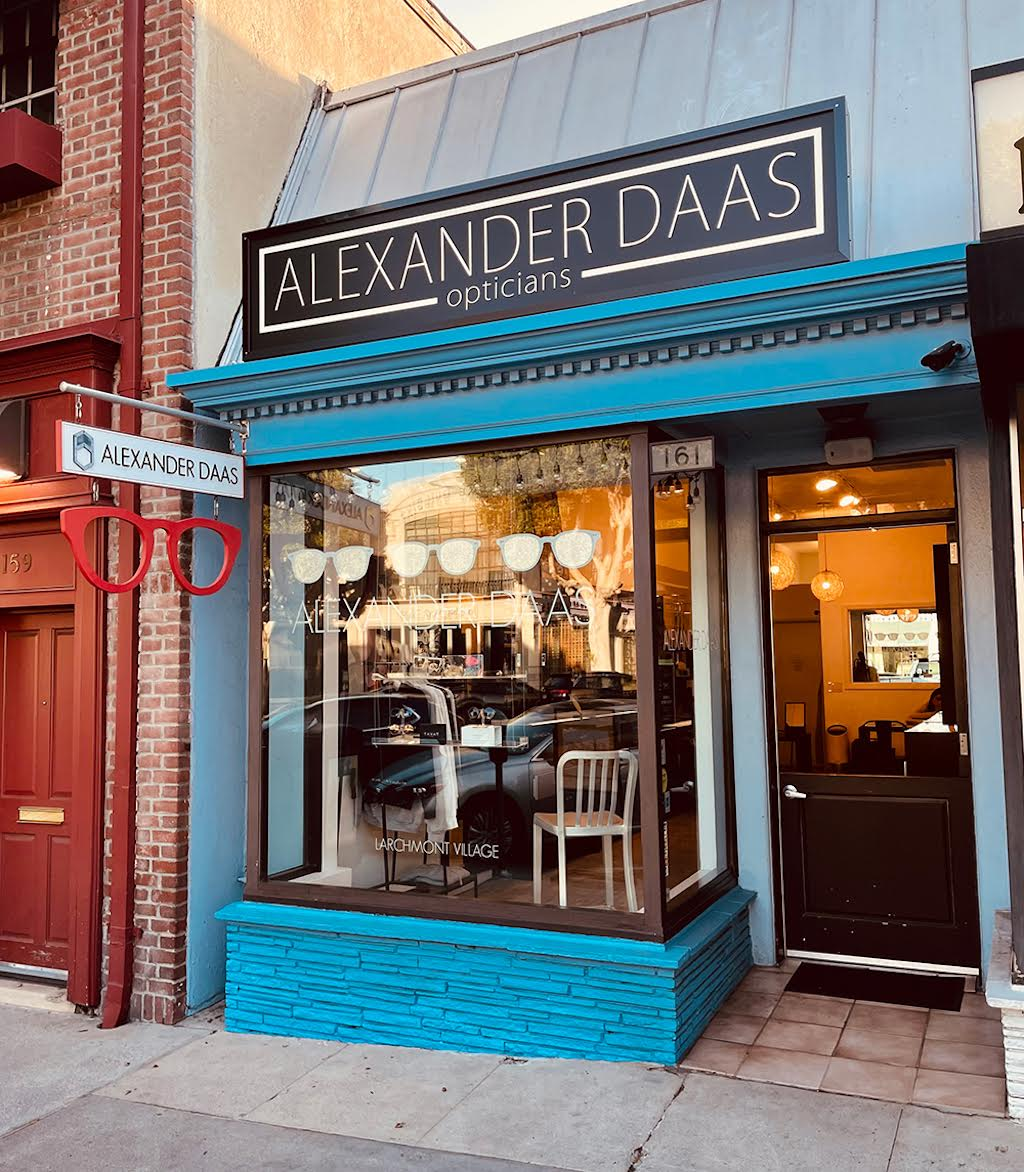
Alexander Daas Opticians, Los Angeles (Larchmont Village)

As of 2025, the company has five Alexander Daas Opticians locations across California, including Del Mar in San Diego, San Clemente in Orange County, Larchmont Village in Los Angeles, Palo Alto in Silicon Valley, and the Marina in San Francisco (called San Francisco Optics by Alexander Daas, established in 1979). The brand has had pop-up shops in downtown San Diego and Studio City. These stores sell eyewear brands including their house brand and others.
