= Damak Model Higher Secondary School =

- दमक मोडेल उच्च माध्यमिक विद्यालय
- Damak-10, Jhapa, Nepal; Nepal

Information
- School type: Private

Damak Model Higher Secondary School is higher school located at Damak-10, Jhapa, Nepal.
