= Sector No Limits =

Italian watch brand

- Founded: 1973 in Naples
- Key people: Filippo Giardiello
- Products: Watches
- Website: http://www.sectornolimits.com

Sector No Limits and Sector are Italian wristwatch and diving watch brands from the eponymous company.

== History ==
It was founded in 1973 by Filippo Giardiello (then also owner of Philip Watch), in Naples, Italy; later the company was established in Neuchâtel, Switzerland. In 2001, it passed ownership to Bulgari's Opera Group and moved headquarters to Lugano, canton of Ticino, Switzerland. Since 2006 it is owned by the Morellato Group, basically manufacturers of jewellery, in Fratte di Santa Giustina in Colle near Padua, Italy, and is no longer active in Switzerland.

== Models ==
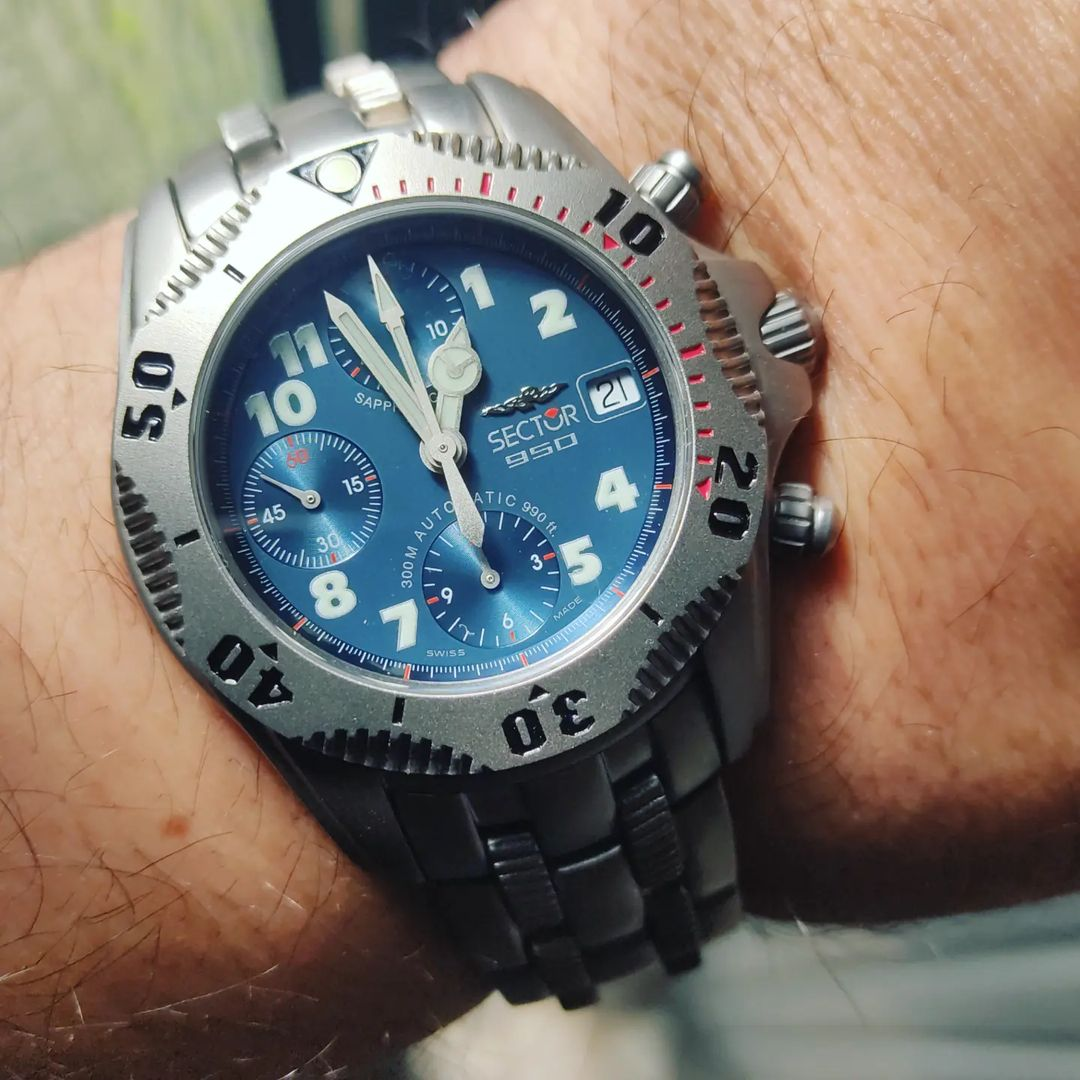
Sector No Limits 950 from the 1990s

Sector No Limits originally developed watches starting with the 1000 series. Then they made the 2500, ADV 3000, 4500, 5500 and 7500 models, all as a part of the Swiss ownership starting in 1973 and ending in 2000.
