= Sunil Vaswani =

Indian-born Nigerian billionaire businessman

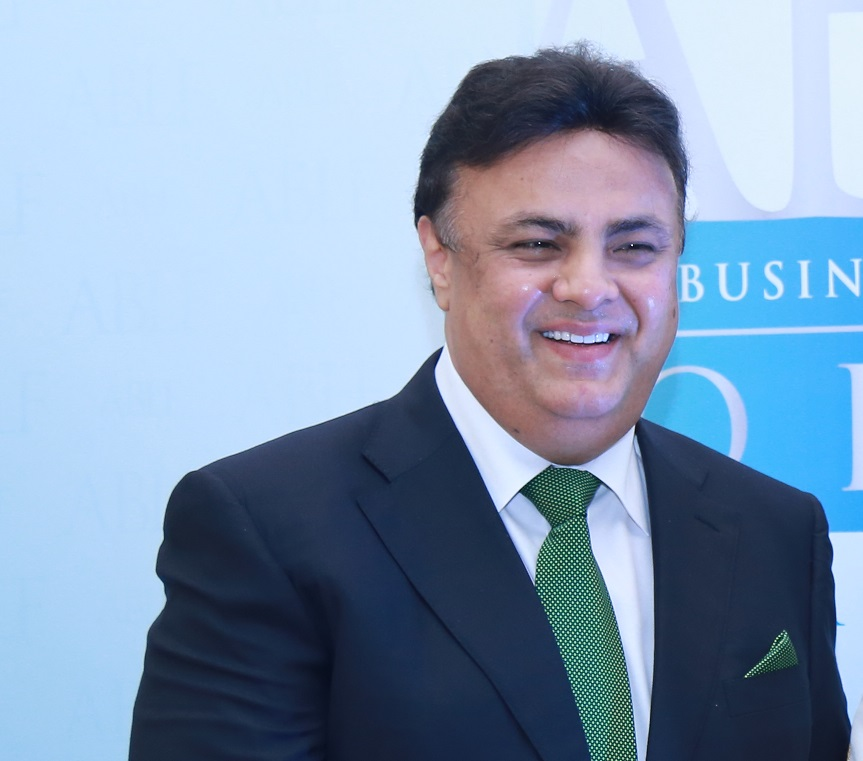
- Born: 11 July 1963 (age 62); Jaipur, India
- Citizenship: Nigerian and British
- Occupation: Businessman
- Title: Chairman, Stallion Group
- Spouse: Rita Vaswani
- Children: 3
- Website: Sunil Vaswani

Sunil Vaswani (born 11 July 1963) is an Indian-born Nigerian billionaire businessman, and the chairman of the Stallion Group; a Dubai-headquartered company with diversified interests in cars, commodities, food, steel manufacturing, plastics, packaging, petrochemicals, port operations and technology. The group operates across Asia, the Middle East and Africa. As of 2025, his net worth was estimated at US$1.8 billion.

== Early life ==
Vaswani was born in Jaipur on 11 July 1963, into a Sindhi family, he is the son of Sundar D Vaswani, grew up in Nigeria, and was educated in London. He is a graduate of economics and accounting from the United Kingdom. He was ranked No.1 in 2015 and 2016 by Forbes Middle East "Top Indian Leaders in the Arab World"

His younger brothers Haresh and Mahesh also work for the company, in Dubai.

== Career ==
Vaswani took over the Nigerian trading business from his father when he was 21.

In 2003, Vaswani moved to the UAE following legal disputes with the government for alleged duty evasion, which led to his deportation. No wrongdoing was found, and the Vaswani family was allowed to return.

In 2021, the Sunday Times Rich List estimated his net worth at £1.159 billion.

== Personal life ==
Vaswani and his wife Rita live in Dubai.

Vaswani holds Nigerian and British passports.
