= Stallion Group =

Conglomerate serving Sub-Saharan Africa

- Industry: Conglomerate
- Founded: 1969
- Headquarters: Dubai, United Arab Emirates
- Area served: Africa, Middle East
- Key people: Sunil Vaswani (Chairman and CEO)
- Number of employees: 285,589 (2021)
- Website: www.stalliongroup.com

Stallion Group is a conglomerate founded in 1969 with headquarters in Dubai. The group is one of the largest in Sub-Saharan Africa. The group has an extensive international presence in 18 countries (As of 2010) with 72 locations and more than 10,000 employees.

Stallion is engaged in commodities, agriculture, automobile assembly, automobile distributorship, food products, industries, FMCG, mining, steel manufacturing, real estate, financial services, technology, logistics and shipping. The group also manages a sole/exclusive portfolio of global auto brands including Honda, Hyundai, Nissan, Porsche, Volkswagen, Audi, Skoda, Foton, Jinbei, BAIC, Changan, Ashok Leyland and Iveco.

Operating multiple assembly facilities, the group is involved in the assembly of Nissan, Hyundai, Ashok Leyland, Iveco and Volkswagen branded vehicles. In 2014 the Stallion rolled out the first Nigeria made Nissan vehicle, a Nissan Patrol. Soon after, Stallion released the first made-in-Nigeria Hyundai passenger car. Stallion has also announced the assembly of Volkswagen branded cars.

Stallion group also processes rice in sub Saharan Africa.
