= Hussain Sajwani =

Emirati businessman

- حسين سجواني
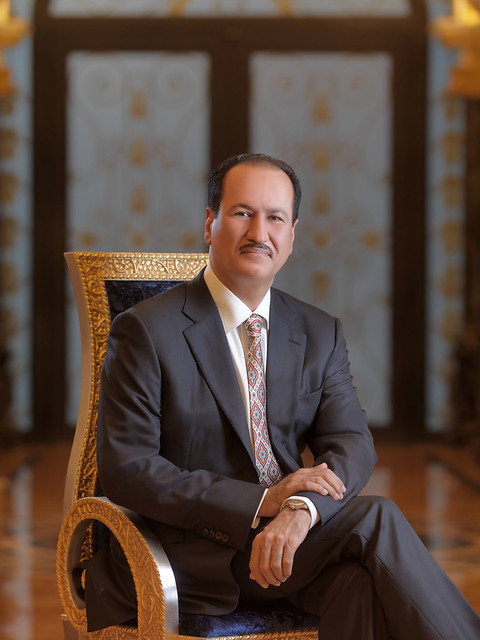
- Born: 1953 (age 72–73)
- Education: University of Washington
- Occupation: Businessman
- Known for: Real estate development
- Title: Founder and chairman, DAMAC Properties
- Children: 4
- Website: hussainsajwani.com

Hussain Sajwani (Arabic: حسين سجواني; 1953) is an Emirati billionaire businessman and the founder of the property development company, DAMAC Properties, and his private investment company, DAMAC Group. Sajwani has also developed data centers in the Middle East, Europe, and Asia.

Sajwani bought land and property in Dubai in the 1990s, just as Dubai was developing into a regional hub. He founded DAMAC Properties in 2002.

According to Forbes, as of 2026, Hussain Sajwani is ranked among the top richest Arabs with a net worth of US$15.3 billion. Sajwani is a business associate of American president Donald Trump.

== Early life and education ==
Hussain Sajwani was born in 1953 and is the eldest of five children. Both of his parents were entrepreneurs. His father was a trader with a shop at the local souk, selling watches, Parker pens, shirts, and goods imported from China. Sajwani obtained a government scholarship and attended a medical college in Baghdad. After his first year, he left for the US and attended the University of Washington, where he studied industrial engineering.

== Career ==
Sajwani started his career in 1981 in the finance department at Abu Dhabi Gas Industries. Two years later, he started a catering venture, with customers including the U.S. military and Bechtel. The venture is still operational and is now called Global Logistics Services.

He founded DAMAC Properties in 2002. DAMAC's Properties include branded developments with Fendi, Roberto Cavalli, Paramount Hotels and Resorts, and Chelsea.

In 2011, an Egyptian court sentenced Sajwani in absentia to five years in prison on corruption charges relating to land purchase. In May 2013 disputes were resolved. The settlement was reached, under which the land was returned to the state and DAMAC withdrew an arbitration claim it had filed against Egypt. Egyptian prosecutors suspended the sentence.

In 2019, Sajwani's private investment firm completed the acquisition of Italian fashion group, Roberto Cavalli.

In 2022, Sajwani acquired the jeweler, De Grisogono, and announced two collaborative development projects in Dubai. In addition, Hussain Sajwani began spearheading a new major venture through Edgnex, founded in 2021 and renamed DAMAC Digital in 2025, focusing on developing data centers in 14 countries with 6GW capacity.

In September 2023, Sajwani officially opened DAMAC Mall, which attracted an annual footfall of approximately 1.3 million visitors.

On 7 January 2025, Sajwani alongside President-elect Donald Trump at a press conference announced a US$20 billion investment to build new data centers across the US.

== Personal life ==
Sajwani is married, has four children, and resides in Dubai.

His son, Ali Sajwani, is the managing director of operations at DAMAC Group. He was named one of the Middle East's future stars by the Arabian Business Achievement Awards 2017, organized by Arabian Business.

His daughter, Amira Sajwani, is Damac's managing director of sales and development.

Another son, Abbas Sajwani, is the founder and chief executive officer of AHS Properties.
