= DAMAC Properties =

Emirati property development company

- Type: Private
- Founded: 28 January 1982; 44 years ago
- Founder: Hussain Sajwani
- Headquarters: Dubai, United Arab Emirates
- Key people: Hussain Sajwani (owner and chairman); Ali Sajwani (managing director, operations and technology); Amira Sajwani (managing director, sales and development)
- Products: Real estate
- Revenue: $3.6 billion (2024)
- Number of employees: 4000+ (2026)
- Parent: DAMAC Group
- Subsidiaries: DAMAC Hotels & Resorts; DAMAC International
- Website: Official website

DAMAC Properties is a global property development company, based in Dubai, United Arab Emirates. It was founded in 1982 by Hussain Sajwani, a billionaire Emirati business tycoon. The company operates internationally.

DAMAC Properties is the company of DAMAC Group, and its subsidiaries include DAMAC Hotels & Resorts and DAMAC International, spanning residential development, hotel management and hospitality.

DAMAC developed large-scale residential and hospitality projects including DAMAC Hills, DAMAC Islands, Trump International Golf Club, DAMAC Residenze.

== History ==
In its early years, the company focused on developing more affordable residential properties. The company faced difficulties during the 2008 financial crisis, laying off 200 employees amid declining property sales.

In 2006, buyers of DAMAC properties raised concerns about construction delays and the quality of finishes. By 2011, the company had begun preparing new projects again, and in October 2012 it agreed to buy the land for the development that later became DAMAC Hills.

In November 2013, DAMAC announced plans to raise approximately $500 million on the London Stock Exchange via a sale of global depository receipts. It was listed on the Dubai Financial Market in early 2015.

In 2022, Sajwani delisted the company from the Dubai stock exchange, a move that proved controversial as the company's fortunes were improving and investors expected to benefit from its growth.

The real estate firm has a long-standing partnership with the businesses of US president Donald Trump. The Guardian reported that Economic Transformation Technologies, a Texas-based company headed by CEO Christopher Condon, paid Alexander Smirnov $600,000 for telling the FBI that Hunter Biden and his father, US President Joe Biden, engaged in a bribery scheme. DAMAC board member and former chairman Farooq Arjomand held a 34% stake in the separate London-based ETT Investment Holding Limited and was listed as an adviser on ETT's website. Smirnov was later charged for telling fabricated corruption stories about Joe Biden to the FBI. In a 2016 disclosure, Trump reporting received between $1 million to $5 million from DAMAC.

In 2024, investigations by Sveriges Television, Radio Free Europe/Radio Liberty and OCCRP reported that a company salesperson mentioned the option of purchasing apartments with cash or cryptocurrency to avoid scrutiny about the source of the money. DAMAC responded that they do not offer such options and will investigate the salesperson's statements.

Early in May 2025 the company was confirmed as the front-of-shirt sponsor for Chelsea Football Club for the rest of the 2024–25 season. The deal will also see the company name on the shirts of the women's team, who have four games remaining this term.

In February 2026, DAMAC Properties signed a global partnership with Oracle Red Bull Racing, becoming the Formula One team's real estate development partner.

DAMAC's partnership with the Trump Organization raised questions about Donald Trump's compliance with the Foreign Emoluments Clause after he became president. His 2016 financial disclosure reported $1–5 million in income from DAMAC.

A 2024 investigation by Sveriges Television, RFE/RL and OCCRP reported that a DAMAC salesperson suggested buying with cash or cryptocurrency to avoid questions about the source of funds. DAMAC denied offering such options and said it would investigate.

== Finances ==
In the year 2017, the total revenue recorded by DAMAC Properties was AED 7.5 billion. In 2018, DAMAC Properties recorded total revenue of AED 6.1 billion. In 2024, the company had approximately $5 billion in cash on hand. In 2018, The company recorded total revenue of AED 6.1 billion. In 2024, the total revenue recorded was AED 13.07 billion.

== Projects ==
The company developed a master-planned residential golf course community around the Trump International Golf Club in Dubai, which opened in February 2017. The partnership between DAMAC and The Trump Organization for the development originated in 2013. Originally known as The Akoya, the developer later renamed the residential development DAMAC Hills. The golf club, with golf course, designed by Gil Hanse, were formally opened in February 2017, with Trump's sons Donald Jr. and Eric as guests of honor.

DAMAC Hills is a golf community development located in Al Hebiah 3 in Dubailand. A Damac hotel is located on the Trump International Golf Club Dubai at DAMAC Hills. In 2014, DAMAC Properties launched, DAMAC Hills 2. In November 2020, DAMAC hills launched UAE's first residential wave pool.

A second DAMAC Properties project in Dubai is Akoya Oxygen, a residential development alongside a second Trump International Golf Course, designed by Tiger Woods. Larger than the DAMAC Hills project, DAMAC announced the project in 2014, selling its first homes that year. The development is located within Dubai's Dubailand development. Spending on the Akoya Oxygen project reached $1.5 billion by mid-2018. In the first six months of 2017, DAMAC Properties said that it had awarded AED 1.8 billion in contracts for Akoya Oxygen (making up the bulk of its total contracts over the same period, valued at AED 3.5 billion). A $20 million road and infrastructure contract for the development was awarded in 2018 to the China State Construction Engineering Corporation (CSCEC). The $169 million construction contract for Akoya Oxygen was awarded in 2019 to Arabtec Construction, a subsidiary of the UAE-based Arabtec Holding.

DAMAC Properties signed a £200 million contract with Lendlease in 2016 to build one of London's tallest residential towers. At 50 floors, AYKON London One, now known as DAMAC Tower Nine Elms London, is located in Nine Elms, on the south bank of the River Thames. The project is valued at $758 million and was topped out in 2019.

DAMAC Heights, a 335 m-tall, 88-floor luxury residential tower in Dubai Marina, opened to tenants in 2018. Arabtec Construction was the primary contractor for the tower, which overlooks Palm Jumeirah.

DAMAC Towers by Paramount is a four-tower development by DAMAC Properties in collaboration with Paramount Hotel & Resorts. The project comprises 2000 units with 1200 units across three residential apartment towers and 800 units in the Paramount Hotel tower.

In 2019, DAMAC completed the Ghalia project with 727 apartments in a Sharia-compliant development, located in the Jumeirah Village Circle in Dubai.

In 2021, the company launched DAMAC Lagoons, a master planned community near DAMAC Hills, inspired by Mediterranean coastal themes, named after iconic coastal landmarks.

In 2025, the company DAMAC Lagoons, a master planned community near DAMAC Hills, inspired by Mediterranean coastal themes, named after iconic coastal landmarks.

Safa Park, followed by Safa Two, a high rise tower to Safa One, nature inspired architectural elements and panoramic views of Dubai Canal. The following year 2022, saw the introduction of Safa One, a residential tower on Sheikh Zayed Road developed in collaboration with de GRISOGONO and overlooking.

Damac owned Safa One and Safa Two. Safa One is situated on the edge of Safa Park, viewing the Dubai Canal while Safa Two is situated opposite to Safa One with views of Dubai Canal, Burj Al Arab and the Palm.

In 2024, the company launched DAMAC Islands, a tropical-themed villa and townhouse community focused on resort-style waterfront living. DAMAC received the Guinness World Records title for the highest revenue generated by a real estate launch in 24 hours for Phase 1 of DAMAC Islands.

In 2025, DAMAC introduced DAMAC District, designed to unified living, working, and social environments.

The company launched Chelsea Residences in Dubai Maritime City, a waterfront residential project developed in partnership with Chelsea Football Club.

In 2025, DAMAC brought a new waterfront living concept to Dubai Investment Park, with contemporary low-rise homes. The project debuted with Shah Rukh Khan and featured a collection of apartments.
