= Arabtec Holding PJSC =

United Arab Emirates construction group

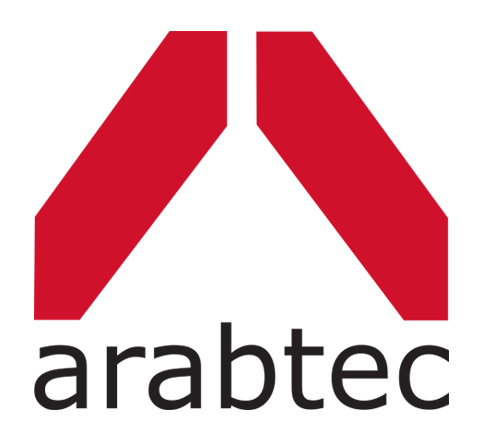
- Type: Public company
- Industry: Construction
- Founded: 1975
- Founder: Riad Burhan Kamal
- Defunct: October 25, 2022
- Fate: Bankrupted
- Headquarters: Shaikh Zayed Road Al Quoz St.04, Dubai., United Arab Emirates
- Services: Residential Developments, Commercial developments, Hotels, Infrastructure, High Rise Development, Super High Rise Development On - and Offshore Oil and Gas and Industrial Projects
- Revenue: 5.66 billion AED (2012)
- Net income: 139.2 million AED (2012)
- Total assets: ▲12.59 billion AED (2012)
- Number of employees: 42,000
- Parent: Mubadala
- Website: arabtecholding.com

Arabtec Holding PJSC was an Emirati multinational construction company headquartered in Dubai, United Arab Emirates, where it was one of the leading companies in its sector. It operated through Construction; Mechanical, Electrical and Plumbing; Oil & Gas, Infrastructure and Power; and other segments. The company was involved in the construction of high-rise towers, buildings, and residential villas, as well as drainage, electrical, mechanical, and plumbing contracting, and civil and infrastructure construction works. It also engaged in real estate investment, development, leasing, and management activities. In addition, the company manufactured precast panels and steel structures, as well as ready-mixed concrete

Arabtec high-profile construction projects included the Burj Khalifa (the tallest building in the world), the fit out of Burj Al Arab (fourth tallest hotel in the world that was constructed by Al Habtoor Engineering Enterprises in partnership with Murray & Roberts), Louvre Museum in Abu Dhabi, Terminal 1 of Dubai International Airport and the passenger terminal of Dubai World Central International Airport (now Al Maktoum International Airport).

Arabtec had business agreements with major construction conglomerates across the world, including the Saudi Binladin Group.

On September 30, 2020, Arabtec filed for liquidation following the fallout from the coronavirus pandemic. On October 25, 2022 a Dubai court declared Arabtec and its subsidiaries bankrupt and approved liquidation of its assets.

== Overview ==
Arabtec Construction, Dubai's most heavily traded and largest construction group in GCC together with its subsidiaries, provided construction services for residential, commercial, oil and gas, infrastructure, power, facilities management, and property development sectors in the United Arab Emirates and internationally. Arabtec Construction was established in Dubai in 1975 and has completed a number of projects in different construction sectors such as High Rise Developments, Hotels and Hotel Interiors, Office Blocks, Commercial Developments, Industrial Projects, Major Airport Developments, Stadiums, Infrastructure and Drainage works, Offshore Oil and Gas Installations and Residential Complexes.

Growth in Dubai was followed by geographical diversification and local and international expansion. Arabtec Construction has associated companies based in Abu Dhabi, Jordan, Pakistan, Qatar, Russia, Saudi Arabia and Syria. Arabtec Construction operates under Arabtec Holding PJSC. The group now consists of 13 subsidiaries, each one providing end-to-end contracting services across the construction value chain.

== Initial Public Offering ==
Arabtec Holding was the first privately held company as well as the first construction company to go public in the UAE. The company was listed on the Dubai Financial Market (DFM) in 2005 and since the IPO the stock has been one of the most traded in the region. In 2010 Dubai Financial Market awarded Arabtec Holding as the most traded stock from year 2000 to 2010.

== Sponsorship ==
Arabtec on May 14, 2014 signed an sponsorship agreement with Premier League giants Manchester City F.C. to sponsor the football club for 3 years.

== History ==
Founded in 1975, Arabtec took advantage of the emerging markets in the UAE during the construction boom of the 1970s. Arabtec Construction started as a construction company specialized in high tech civil engineering and infrastructure works.

During the 1980s Arabtec began an involvement with the oil and gas sectors in Abu Dhabi.

In 2011, Arabtec formed a joint-venture with Raheja Developers of India. Raheja Developers awarded construction contracts worth US$204 million to the JV. The company's first project is to construct a 56-story, 196-meter-high (643 ft) residential complex, known as Raheja Revanta, in Gurgaon.

In 2013, Arabtec formed a joint-venture with Samsung Engineering of South Korea. They will collaborate to undertake large-scale projects in oil & gas, power and infrastructure in the Middle East and North Africa. Arabtec-Samsung will bid for contracts that range from $3 billion to $10 billion in value.

In August 2012, Arabtec won AED11 billion contract to build the new airport in Abu Dhabi (Midfield Terminal Building) in JV with Turkish TAV and CCC (TCA-JV).

In 2015, Arabtec posted a loss of $626 million.

In 2016, Arabtec won the US$1.1 billion contract to build a new terminal at Bahrain International Airport under the name of Bahrain International Airport Modernization Program having a Joint Venture with a Turkish Company called TAV Construction; together the company is referred as ATJV in Bahrain.

== Liquidation ==
Arabtec Holding shareholders authorised the board to file for liquidation due to its undefendable financial position following the bad economic condition due to the coronavirus pandemic.

On October 25, 2022 Dubai court declared Arabtec and all its subsidiaries bankrupt and approved liquidation of its assets

== Labour Welfare ==
In 2016, Arabtec was awarded a 5 star rating Taqdeer Award. The Taqdeer Award, launched by Shaikh Hamdan Bin Mohammad Bin Rashid Al Maktoum, Crown Prince of Dubai is the first of its kind in the world that seeks to recognise companies for their labour policies and efforts, so as to inspire them to further improve their labour practices. Arabtec was evaluated based on factors considered for the ratings, which include labour policies, facilities and infrastructure, health and safety, labour security, recruitment and wages, justice and transparency, labour relations and other indicators.

== Controversy ==
In a 2009 BBC Panorama program, Arabtec was exposed as treating their migrant workers inhumanely. The program showed how Arabtec failed to provide its workers with basic amenities to live with conditions deteriorating rapidly across the camp.

Armed with secret cameras, BBC reporters sneaked into the camp to be met with the smell of raw sewage. Sewage had leaked out all over the camp, and workers had to create a network of stepping stones to cross it and get back to their accommodation blocks.

Documents which had been obtained by the BBC clearly show that a month previous to the television crews' visit, the Dubai municipality described the sewage situation at the site as critical. Arabtec had also been fined 10,000 AED, which is approximately £2,000, for neglecting hygiene standards and allowing sewage to overflow into accommodation used by workers.

Arabtec said it did not accept that there were unsanitary conditions at any of its camps' toilets. It blamed the workers, saying, despite training, their "standards of cleanliness and hygiene are not up to your or our standards".

== Joint ventures and subsidiaries ==
- Arabtec Holding PJSC, Dubai, UAE – Holding company – Management of subsidiaries
- Austrian Arabian Ready Mix, Dubai, UAE – Manufacture and transportation of ready mix concrete products
- House of Equipment Co. L.L.C, Dubai, UAE – Trading and leasing of construction equipment.
- Arabtec Construction Qatar L.L.C, Doha, Qatar – Civil construction and related works
- Arabtec Precast L.L.C, Dubai, UAE – Manufacture of precast panels
- Nasser Bin Khaled Factory Ready Mix Concrete Co. L.C.C, Doha, Qatar – Manufacture and transportation of ready mix concrete product.
- Emirates Falcon Electromechanical Co. (EFECO) L.L.C, Dubai, UAE – Electrical mechanical and plumbing contracts
- Arabtec Construction (India) Private Limited, Gurgaon, India - JV with Raheja Developers for residential complex construction works
- Arabtec Engineering Services L.L.C, Dubai, UAE – Infrastructure construction works
- Arabtec Construction Syria L.L.C, Syria – Civil construction and related works
- Arabtec Pakistan Limited, Pakistan – Civil construction and related works
- Target Engineering Construction Company, Abu Dhabi, UAE – Civil construction and related works
- Gulf Steel Industries FZC, Sharjah, UAE – Fabrication of steel structures and profiles.
- Arabtec Saudi Arabia L.L.C, Saudi Arabia – Civil Construction and related works
- Polypod Middle East L.L.C, Abu Dhabi, UAE – Manufacture of bathroom, kitchen and hot press pods
- Arabtec Egypt L.L.C, Cairo, Egypt - Egyptian construction and infrastructure markets with focus on residential, infrastructure and commercial projects.
- Arabtec-Samsung Engineering, Dubai, UAE – Energy and power-related projects in North Africa and the Middle East
- Arabtec Raheja, Delhi-NCR, India – Civil Construction and related works

== Major services and projects of ARABTEC ==
Arabtec is one of the largest contractors for civil and infrastructure works, having executed several notable projects such as the Burj Khalifa, completed in January 2010 the tower is the tallest in the world standing 828 metres above ground.

Major projects executed or under progress —

- High Rise Developments e.g. Burj Khalifa, tallest structure in the world, Infinity Tower, Lakhta Center, Karachi Financial Towers, Ocean Heights, 21st Century Tower
- Hotels e.g. Emirates Palace Hotel, Aloft Hotel, Fairmont Hotel, The Address Downtown Dubai Hotel
- Hotel Interiors e.g. Burj Al Arab, Jumeirah Beach Hotel and Ritz Carlton
- Commercial e.g. Dubai Maritime City, Dubai International Financial Center Gate Village, Exhibition Centre for ADNEC
- Oil and Gas e.g. Mubarraz Island, Gas Processing Plant
- Major Airport Developments e.g. Dubai Airport and Dubai World Central International Airport
- Stadiums e.g. Ghantoot Grandstand and Dubai Sports City Stadiums
- Residential Complexes e.g. Emirates Hills, Arabian Ranches, Raheja Revanta (Gurgaon, India) and Jumeirah Beach Residences
- Mixed Use Developments e.g. Al Waab City
- Industrial and Marine Projects e.g. Abu Dhabi Ship Building Facility, Mubarraz Island oil processing plant
- Educational Developments e.g. Princess Nora bint Abdul Rahman University, Saudi Arabia
- Oil, Gas, and Power e.g. Middle East and North Africa; Joint venture with Samsung Engineering.

== Expansion plans ==
Arabtec Construction has announced plans to expand into the emerging markets of the Middle East and North Africa (MENA region). Plans are set to enter Algeria, Angola, Azerbaijan, Libya, and Turkmenistan.

Arabtec was in 2009 ranked as the 104th largest Global Contractor, based on the total firm contracting revenue, according to the Engineering News Record.

== Awards ==
Company awards

- World Finance Company of the Decade 2000-2010, World Finance Magazine March–April 2011, (2011)
- Mohammed Bin Rashid Al Maktoum (MRM) Business Award 2008, Construction Category, (2008)
- Company of the Year, Arabian Business Awards, (2007)

Project awards

- The Address, Downtown Dubai - New Hotel 2008 at the World Hotel Award, (2008)
- Infinity Towers - Six World Class Design Awards, Cayan Investment Development
- Sanctuary Falls, 96 Villas - Best Golf Development, CNBC, Arabian Property Award, (2007)
- Le Reve - Best Luxury Development in the world Gold Awards, Home Overseas Magazine Awards, UK, (2006)
- Le Reve - Best Use of Technology, Home Overseas Magazine Awards, UK, (2006)
- Emirates Hills - Gold Award, Home Overseas Magazine Awards, UK, (2005)
