= Ross Wimer =

American architect

- Occupation: Architect
- Buildings: Cayan Tower, White Magnolia Plaza
- Projects: Leamouth Peninsula

Ross Wimer, FAIA is an American architect, known for integrating the rigor and logic of engineering into his designs. Until October 2013, he was a design director in the Chicago office of Skidmore, Owings & Merrill, LLP. During his tenure at SOM from 1995 to 2013, he created architectural projects in over 20 cities on five continents. Mr. Wimer is a Fellow of the American Institute of Architects. He currently leads AECOM's architecture practice in the Americas.

The majority of these designs are for large scale mixed-use programs such as Leamouth Peninsula in London, Cayan Tower in Dubai, as well as Greenland Group Suzhou Center and White Magnolia Plaza in China. Examples of other work include city planning as in the 93 hectare Marina Bay Master Plan, high-speed rail station design such as Tanggu Rail Hub, airport design as in Changi Airport Terminal 3, and industrial design projects such as the New York Standard Streetlight and door hardware for Valli & Valli SPA.

Mr. Wimer believes that environmental sustainability and expressive structure help define the aesthetic of architecture, which can be seen in projects such as Zhengzhou Greenland Plaza. His projects have been published widely; exhibited at the Venice Biennale, Art Institute of Chicago, and The Museum of Modern Art in New York; and have received numerous awards, including three Progressive Architecture Awards. Mr. Wimer was featured on the cover of the inaugural issue of Architect Magazine in which he explained that his joy in being an architect is the moral obligation that goes into the project. He believes that it's gratifying to create something that affects people's lives on a daily basis. In his projects, he stresses the importance of exposing the site of a project rather than imposing on it.

== Education ==
In 1984, Mr. Wimer earned a Bachelor of Arts with Distinction from Yale University followed by a Master of Architecture with Commendation from Harvard University in 1988.

== Professional associations ==
- Fellow, American Institute of Architects (FAIA)
- Adjunct Professor, Illinois Institute of Technology
- Board of Trustees, Graham Foundation
- Board of Trustees, Chicago Architecture Foundation

== Key projects ==
- Cayan Tower, Dubai, United Arab Emirates
- Leamouth Peninsula, London, United Kingdom
- City Lights Design Competition, New York, New York
- White Magnolia Plaza, Shanghai, China
- Valli & Valli Door Hardware, United States
- Tyrol Tower, Wörgl, Austria
- Qatar Science Centre, Doha, Qatar
- Changi International Airport - Terminal 3, Changi, Singapore
- Chicago 2016 Olympic Master Plan, Chicago, Illinois
- Crossharbour, London, United Kingdom
- The Ledge at Skydeck Chicago, Chicago, Illinois

== See also ==
- Craig Hartman
- David Childs
- George J. Efstathiou (architect)
- Roger Duffy
- Skidmore, Owings & Merrill
- T.J. Gottesdiener
- William F. Baker (engineer)
- Philip Enquist
