= William F. Baker (engineer) =

American structural engineer (born 1953)

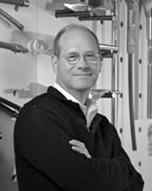
- Born: October 9, 1953 (age 73); Fulton, Missouri, U.S.
- Education: Bachelor of Science in Civil Engineering, University of Missouri, Master of Science in Civil Engineering, University of Illinois
- Engineering career
- Discipline: Structural engineer and civil engineer
- Institutions: IStructE, ASCE, ACI, AISC, CTBUH, NCEES, IABSE, EERI, SEAOI, NAE, RAE
- Practice name: Skidmore, Owings & Merrill LLP
- Projects: Burj Khalifa, Trump International Hotel and Tower, Cayan Tower
- Significant design: Burj Khalifa
- Awards: International Fellow RAE, IStructE Gold Medal, Fritz Leonhardt Prize, Fazlur Kahn Lifetime Achievement Medal, 2011 OPAL Lifetime Achievement Award for Design

William Frazier Baker (born October 9, 1953) is an American structural engineer known for engineering the Burj Khalifa, the world's tallest building/man-made structure and a number of other well known buildings. He is currently a structural engineering partner in the Chicago office of Skidmore, Owings & Merrill, LLP (SOM).

Baker was elected as a member into the National Academy of Engineering in 2011 for leadership in the development of innovative structures for high-rise buildings worldwide.

== Career and education ==
After obtaining a bachelor's degree in civil engineering from the University of Missouri (1975), Baker briefly worked for ExxonMobil and later completed his master's degree at the University of Illinois (1980). In 1981, he joined the architecture and engineering firm of Skidmore, Owings and Merrill, LLP (SOM) in Chicago; he became a partner there in 1996.

Widely regarded for his work on supertall buildings, Baker also worked on the Broadgate-Exchange House (London, 1990) and the GM Renaissance Center Entry Pavilion (Detroit, 2005). He is further known for his work on long-span roof structures, such as the McCormick Place North Building Expansion (Chicago, 1986), the Korean Air Lines Operations Center (Seoul, 1995), the Korea World Trade Center Expansion (Seoul, 2000), and the Virginia Beach Convention Center (Virginia Beach, 2007). Baker has collaborated with artists such as Jamie Carpenter (Raspberry Island-Schubert Club Band Shell, 2002), Iñigo Manglano-Ovalle (Gravity is a Force to be Reckoned With, 2010), Jaume Plensa (World Voices, 2010), and James Turrell (Roden Crater).

Baker's many skyscraper projects include the AT&T Corporate Center (Chicago, 1989), Trump International Hotel and Tower (Chicago, 2008), Cayan Tower (Dubai, 2009), Pearl River Tower (Guangzhou, 2009), Nanjing Greenland Financial Center (Nanjing, 2009), and the unbuilt 7 South Dearborn (Chicago, 2003). He is best known as the engineer of Burj Khalifa (Dubai, 2009), the world's tallest man-made structure. To support the tower's record heights, he developed the "buttressed core" structural system, consisting of a hexagonal core reinforced by three buttresses that form a Y shape. This innovative system allows the structure to support itself both laterally and torsionally. It also eliminates the need for column transfers, and moves loads in a smooth path from the tower's spire into its foundations.

Baker is a Fellow of the American Society of Civil Engineers (ASCE) and the Institution of Structural Engineers (IStructE). He is a member of the National Academy of Engineering (NAE), and frequently lectures on a variety of structural engineering topics within the US and abroad. Baker was elected as an International Fellow to the Royal Academy of Engineering (RAE) in September 2014.

== Awards ==
In 2014, Baker was awarded the International Award of Merit in Structural Engineering from the International Association for Bridge and Structural Engineering and in 2013 the T.R. Higgins Lectureship Award from the American Institute of Steel Construction.

In 2011, he received an ASCE Outstanding Projects and Leaders (OPAL) Lifetime Award for Design. On May 13, 2010, the Institution of Structural Engineers gave Baker with their Gold Medal, its highest accolade. Baker was the first American to receive the Fritz Leonhardt Prize For Achievement in Structural Engineering, on July 11, 2009. On November 20, 2008, he received the Fazlur Khan Lifetime Achievement Medal from the Council on Tall Buildings and Urban Habitat.

Baker is an honorary professor at the University of Cambridge. He has received honorary doctorates from the University of Missouri in 2017, Illinois Institute of Technology in 2015, Heriot-Watt University in 2012, and the University of Stuttgart in 2011.

== Key projects ==
- Burj Khalifa Dubai, United Arab Emirates
- Pearl River Tower, Guangzhou, China
- Cayan Tower, Dubai, United Arab Emirates
- 100 Mount Street, Sydney, Australia
- Manhattan West Development, New York, New York
- Manulife Office Building Development and Pedestrian Bridge, Calgary, Canada
- Broadgate – Exchange House, London, United Kingdom
- GM Renaissance Center – North Lobby, Detroit, Michigan
- Korean Air Lines Operations Center, Seoul, South Korea
- Trump International Hotel and Tower, Chicago, Illinois
- NATO Headquarters, Brussels, Belgium
- Raspberry Island – Schubert Club Band Shell, St. Paul, Minnesota
- Millennium Park – Jay Pritzker Pavilion & BP Pedestrian Bridge, Chicago, Illinois

== Education ==
- University of Illinois at Urbana–Champaign, Grainger College of Engineering, Master of Science in Civil Engineering, 1980
- University of Missouri, Bachelor of Science in Civil Engineering, 1975

== Professional associations ==
- International Fellow, Royal Academy of Engineering (RAE)
- Fellow, American Society of Civil Engineers (ASCE)
- Fellow, Institution of Structural Engineers (IStructE)
- American Concrete Institute (ACI)
- Committee on Specifications, American Institute of Steel Construction (AISC)
- Council on Tall Buildings and Urban Habitat (CTBUH)
- Earthquake Engineering Research Institute (EERI)
- International Association for Shell and Spatial Structures (IASS)
- International Association for Bridge and Structural Engineering (IABSE)
- National Academy of Engineering (NAE)
- National Council of Examiners for Engineering and Surveying (NCEES)
- Structural Engineers Association of Illinois (SEAOI)
- Structural Engineers Association of Northern California (SEAONC)
- Structural Engineers Association of New York (SEAONY)
- Certified in the Practice of Structural Engineering by the Structural Engineering Certification Board (SECB)
- University of Illinois President’s Council

== See also ==
- Buttressed core
- David Childs
- Roger Duffy
- George J. Efstathiou
- Philip Enquist
- T.J. Gottesdiener
- Craig W. Hartman
- Fazlur Rahman Khan
- Mark Sarkisian
- Skidmore, Owings & Merrill
- Ross Wimer
