= Design Futures Council =

- Abbreviation: DFC
- Formation: 1993
- Type: Membership organization
- Purpose: Exploring global trends, challenges, and opportunities to advance innovation and shape the future of the A/E/C industry
- Headquarters: Atlanta, GA
- Region served: Worldwide
- President & CEO: Dave Gilmore
- Affiliations: , DesignIntelligence

The Design Futures Council is an interdisciplinary network of design, product, and construction leaders exploring global trends, challenges, and opportunities to advance innovation and shape the future of the industry and environment. Members include architecture and design firms, building product manufacturers, service providers, and forward-thinking AEC firms of all sizes that take an active interest in their future.

== History ==
In 1993-94, at the Smithsonian Castle on the East Coast and at the Salk Institute on the West Coast, a network of regional and national design firms began sharing ideas, benchmarks, and proprietary financial analysis with each another. They brought successful practice strategies into dialogue with the world of client demands, budgets, innovation, technology, and communications. These architects, designers, and thought leaders were seeking to build better futures for their firms in their roles as partners, leaders, and futurists.

James P. Cramer, Hon. AIA, Hon. IIDA, Chairman & CEO of Greenway Group, a Washington, D.C.–based management consulting firm, facilitated the sharing of ideas and experiences within this network. A newsletter with information about profitability, tax considerations, business measures, and capital expenditure decisions was circulated as a result.

In the beginning, the group had no name but talked about in industry circles, with references to “that design futures network.”

During this time, Greenway Consulting was working with other clients allied to the design professions who became enthusiastic about supporting the network. Those clients included Cecil Steward of the University of Nebraska, Doug Parker of Steelcase, Jonas Salk of the Salk Institute, Jerry Hobbs and Paul Curran of BPI/VNU Communications, and Arol Wolford of CMD. In addition, principal leaders from Gensler; Skidmore, Owings and Merrill; Hammel, Green and Abrahamson; Perkins and Will; CommArts; and two dozen other firms provided leadership vision and energy.

The network held meetings in La Jolla, Calif., Washington, D.C., and New York City, solidifying the concept of expanding the group and making the proprietary information available to a broader audience. Greenway Consulting proposed to BPI/VNU Communications that this information-sharing bulletin be published for a subscription fee and be named DesignIntelligence. The first issue was published on May 15, 1995.

Shortly thereafter, this leadership network officially became the Design Futures Council. They met in the offices of Greenway Consulting in Washington, D.C., and in meeting rooms at the Smithsonian Institution’s Castle. Invitations for programs and sharing of ideas came from the American Institute of Architects, the American Consulting Engineers Council, the Industrial Designers Society of America, the Aga Khan Trust for Culture, the World Future Society, the International Interior Design Association, the American Society of Interior Designers, the Design-Build Institute, the Design Management Institute, and many colleges and universities.

== Notable Senior Fellows ==
Fellowship in the Design Futures Council is granted to outstanding individuals who have provided noteworthy leadership toward the advancement of design, design solutions, or the design professions. Senior fellows of the DFC are recognized for significant contributions toward the understanding of changing trends, new research, or applied knowledge leading to innovative design models that improve the built environment and the human condition. They include:

- David Adjaye, principal, Adjaye Associates
- Ray Anderson^, founder and chairman, Interface Inc.
- Janine M. Benyus, biomimicry & sustainability expert
- Peter Bohlin, founder, Bohlin Cywinski Jackson
- John Seely Brown, co-chairman, Deloitte Center for Edge Innovation
- Santiago Calatrava, Pioneering Forms and Spaces, Santiago Calatrava Architects
- Robert Campbell, architecture critic, Boston Globe
- David Childs, consulting design partner, Skidmore, Owings & Merrill
- Clayton Christensen, Robert and Jane Cizik Professor of Business Administration, Harvard Business School
- Steve Chu, Nobel laureate and Secretary of Energy, U.S. Dept. of Energy
- Carol Coletta, president and CEO, CEOs for Cities
- Michael Crichton, design advocate, author, Film Director
- Philip Enquist^, partner, Skidmore, Owings & Merrill
- Richard Farson, Ph.D., president, Western Behavioral Sciences Institute
- Richard Florida, professor and head of the Martin Prosperity Institute at the Rotman School of Management at the University of Toronto
- Sir Norman Foster, founder and chairman, Foster and Partners
- Harrison Fraker, professor, University of California, Berkeley
- R. Buckminster (Bucky) Fuller*, engineer, inventor, educator, and architectural innovator
- Jan Gehl, principal, Gehl Architects
- Frank Gehry, architect, Gehry Partners
- Milton Glaser, founder, Milton Glaser Inc.
- Paul Goldberger, architecture critic, The New Yorker
- Al Gore, former vice president of the United States
- Michael Graves, architect, Michael Graves & Associates
- Zaha Hadid, architect, Zaha Hadid Architects
- Jeremy Harris, former mayor, Honolulu, Hawaii
- Craig W. Hartman, design partner, Skidmore, Owings & Merrill
- Paul Hawken, founder, Natural Capital Institute
- Carl Hodges, founder and chairman, Seawater Foundation
- Steven Holl, architect, Steven Holl Architects
- Robert Ivy, chief executive officer of the American Institute of Architects (AIA)
- Jane Jacobs^, urban theorist, author, Educator & Community Activist
- Louis I. Kahn^, architect and educator, University of Pennsylvania
- Blair Kamin, architecture critic, Chicago Tribune
- Bruce Katz, founding director, Brookings Metropolitan Policy Program and vice president, Brookings Institution
- Ray Kurzweil, American author, inventor, and futurist
- Theodore C. Landsmark, president, Boston Architectural College
- Maya Lin, artist and designer, Maya Lin Studio
- Amory Lovins, chief scientist and founder, Rocky Mountain Institute
- John Maeda, president, Rhode Island School of Design
- Bruce Mau, chief creative officer, Bruce Mau Design Inc.
- Thom Mayne, founder and design director, Morphosis
- Ed Mazria, environmental advocate and founder, Architecture 2030
- William McDonough, architect, William McDonough + Partners
- Steven McKay, Architect, CEO|President DLR Group
- Richard Meier, managing partner, Richard Meier & Partners Architects
- Glenn Murcutt, professor and architect
- John Ochsendorf, MacArthur "Genius Award" Fellow and associate professor of building technology & architecture, Massachusetts Institute of Technology
- Neri Oxman, professor, MIT Media Lab
- Adrian Parr, UNESCO water chair and dean, College of Architecture, Planning, and Public Affairs, University of Texas, Arlington
- Alexander (Sandy) Pentland, Ph.D., educator and researcher, MIT Media Lab
- Renzo Piano, architect, Renzo Piano Building Workshop
- B. Joseph Pine II, branding strategist and author, Strategic Horizons LLP
- Dan Pink, author and economics lecturer
- William Bradley (Brad) Pitt, actor and environmental advocate
- Jane Poynter, chairwoman and president, Paragon Space Development Corporation
- Antoine Predock, architect, Antoine Predock Architect
- Witold Rybczynski, Myerson Professor, Wharton School of Business, University of Pennsylvania
- Moshe Safdie, architect, Moshe Safdie and Associates
- Jonas Salk, M.D.^, co-founder, Design Futures Council; Founder, Salk Institute
- Peter Schwartz, co-founder, Global Business Network
- Terrence J. Sejnowski, Ph.D., brain scientist, Salk Institute
- Cameron Sinclair, co-founder and chief eternal optimist, Architecture for Humanity
- Adrian Smith, principal, Adrian Smith + Gordon Gill Architecture
- Alex Steffen, planetary futurist
- Sarah Susanka, architect, Susanka Studios
- David Suzuki, co-founder, David Suzuki Foundation
- Richard Swett, president, Swett Associates; former U.S. Representative, New Hampshire; former U.S. Ambassador to Denmark
- Lene Tranberg, head architect and co-founder, Lundgaard & Tranberg
- John Carl Warnecke, architect and contextual design advocate
- Alice Waters, founder, Chez Panisse Foundation
- Jon Westling, professor, Boston University
- Richard Saul Wurman, founder, Access Guide and TED
