= T. J. Gottesdiener =

American architect

- Occupation: Architect
- Practice: Skidmore, Owings & Merrill
- Buildings: 7 World Trade Center, Tokyo Midtown, One World Trade Center

T. J. Gottesdiener is an architect and managing partner of the New York office of Skidmore, Owings & Merrill (SOM). A graduate of Cooper Union’s Irwin S. Chanin School of Architecture, Gottesdiener joined SOM in 1980 and was made Partner in 1994. He lives with his wife in New York City; they have one son.

Gottesdiener is a fellow of the American Institute of Architects.

== Career ==
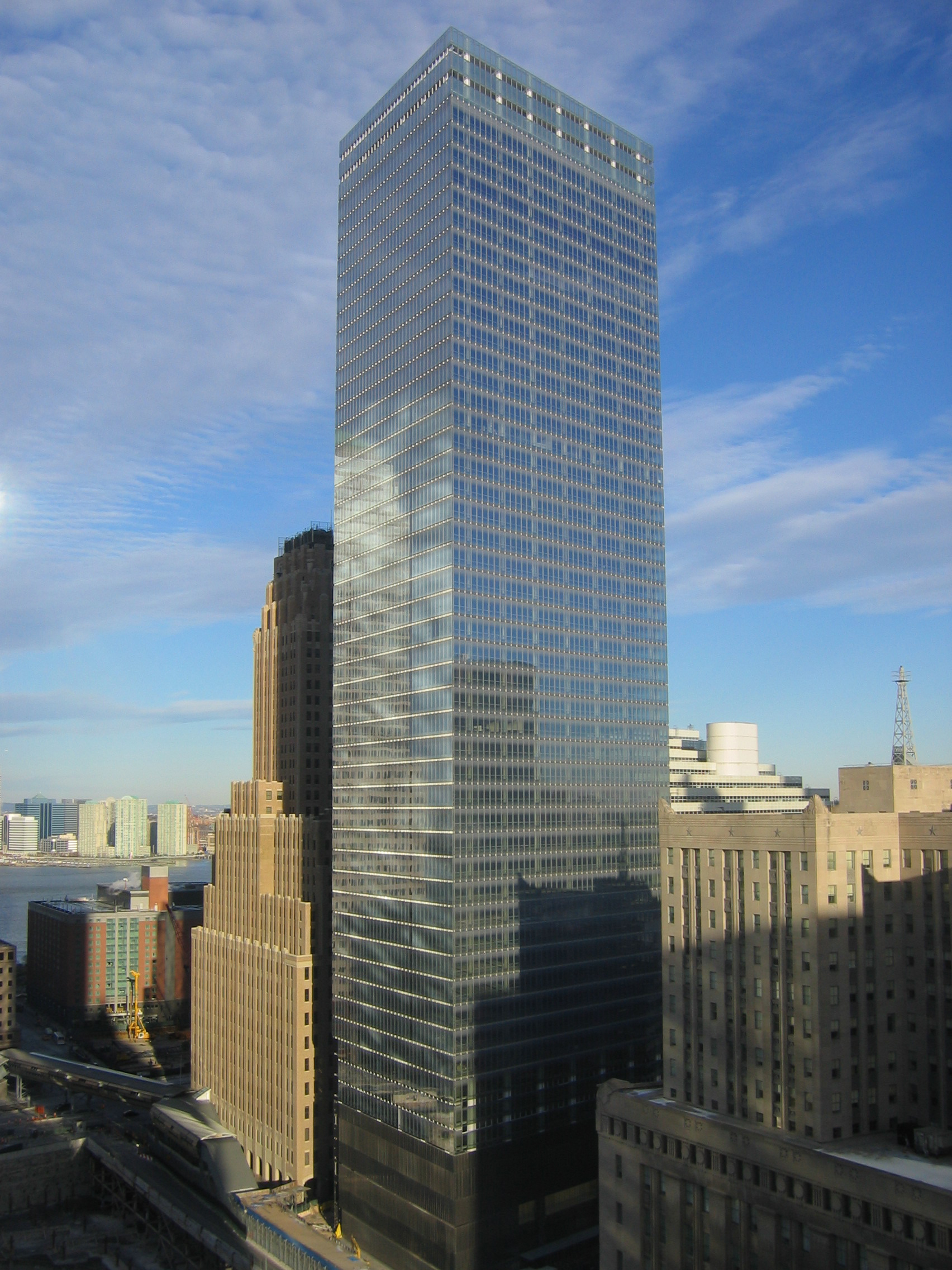
7 World Trade Center

Gottesdiener is committed to enhancing the built environment of New York City and has been responsible for some of SOM’s most complex and challenging projects in Manhattan. Closely involved in the revitalization of Lower Manhattan and the redevelopment of the World Trade Center site, he has played a major role in the planning and phasing for the design and construction of 13 million square feet of commercial construction in cooperation with agencies responsible for the memorial, cultural, and transportation functions. He was Managing Partner for 7 World Trade Center, which was completed in 2006, and One World Trade Center (“the Freedom Tower”), which was completed in July 2013.

=== Summary of work ===
Other important New York City projects include the 2,600,000-square-foot (240,000 m^{2}) Time Warner Center Development; the headquarters of the New York Mercantile Exchange in Battery Park City; the 44-story Bear Stearns Headquarters Building in midtown Manhattan; Times Square Site 1, a 1,300,000-square-foot (120,000 m^{2}) office building in the heart of Times Square; and the renovation of the landmark Lever House building. He is currently working on two of Manhattan’s most high-profile projects: the One World Trade Center and the new Moynihan Station. Along with his project responsibilities, Gottesdiener is also responsible for management and operations for SOM’s New York office.

Internationally, he has worked extensively in Brazil (five projects totaling 5 million square feet) and The Philippines (five projects totaling more than 4 million square feet), and current projects in Asia. Other international projects include: the 112-story, 1,800-foot (550 m)-tall mixed-use Lotte Super Tower in Seoul, South Korea; a hotel and residential project in Mexico City featuring two towers totaling 840,000 square feet (78,000 m^{2}); the 36-story AIG office tower in Hong Kong; and the recently opened Tokyo Midtown project in Japan, a mixed-use master plan and development with office, retail, residential, a Ritz-Carlton hotel and museum components totaling over 5,000,000 square feet (460,000 m^{2}). He has also been involved in a range of architecture and interiors projects for financial and corporate clients including the New York Stock Exchange, JP Morgan, Alcoa, Salomon Brothers, and Citibank.

== Projects ==
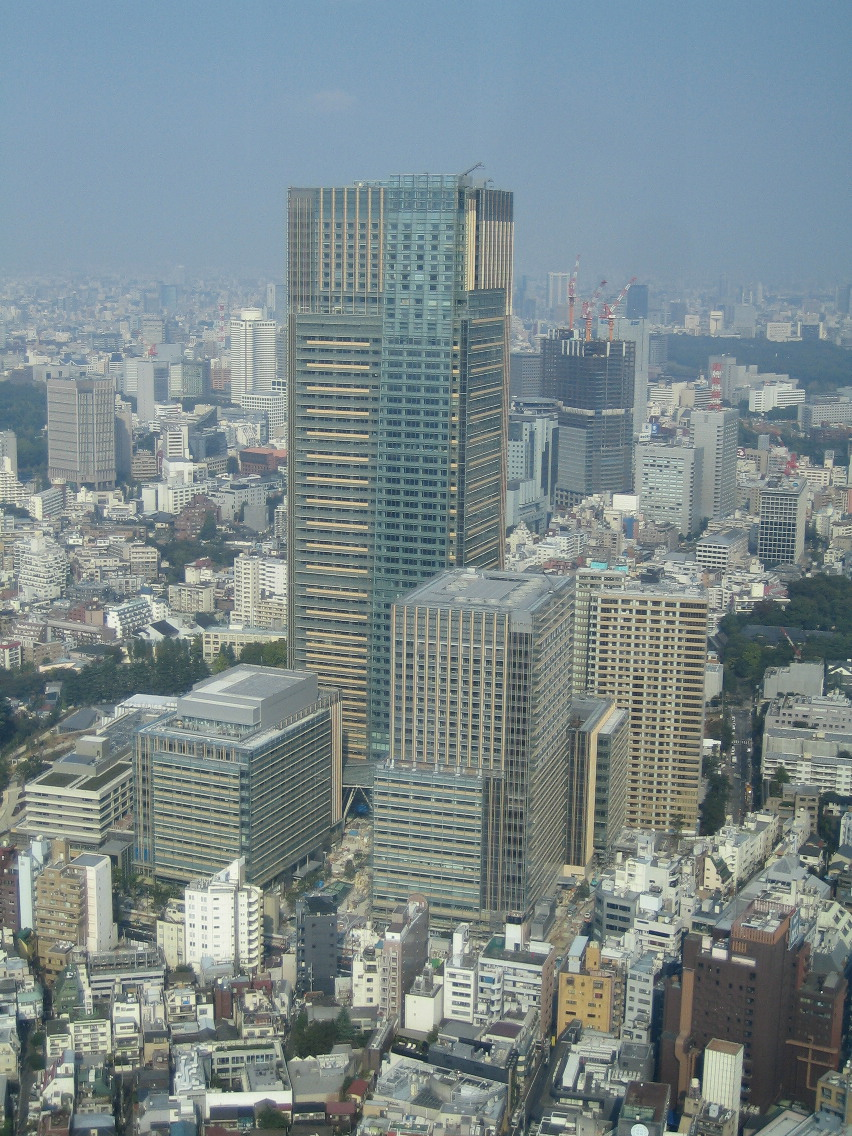
Tokyo Midtown

=== New York ===
- One World Trade Center, the Freedom Tower
- 7 World Trade Center
- Time Warner Center
- Bear Stearns Headquarters
- Times Square Tower
- Lever House Renovation
- New York Mercantile Exchange
- Random House Tower Headquarters
- 101 Warren Street
- Moynihan Station Redevelopment

=== International ===
- Tokyo Midtown, Tokyo, Japan
- AIG Tower, Hong Kong
- Ben Gurion International Airport, Terminal 3 (landside terminal), Tel Aviv, Israel
- PhilAm Life Headquarters, Manila, Philippines
- Lotte Super Tower, Seoul, Korea
- Esentai Park, Esentai, Kazakhstan
- Almaty Financial District, Almaty, Kazakhstan

== Civic involvement ==
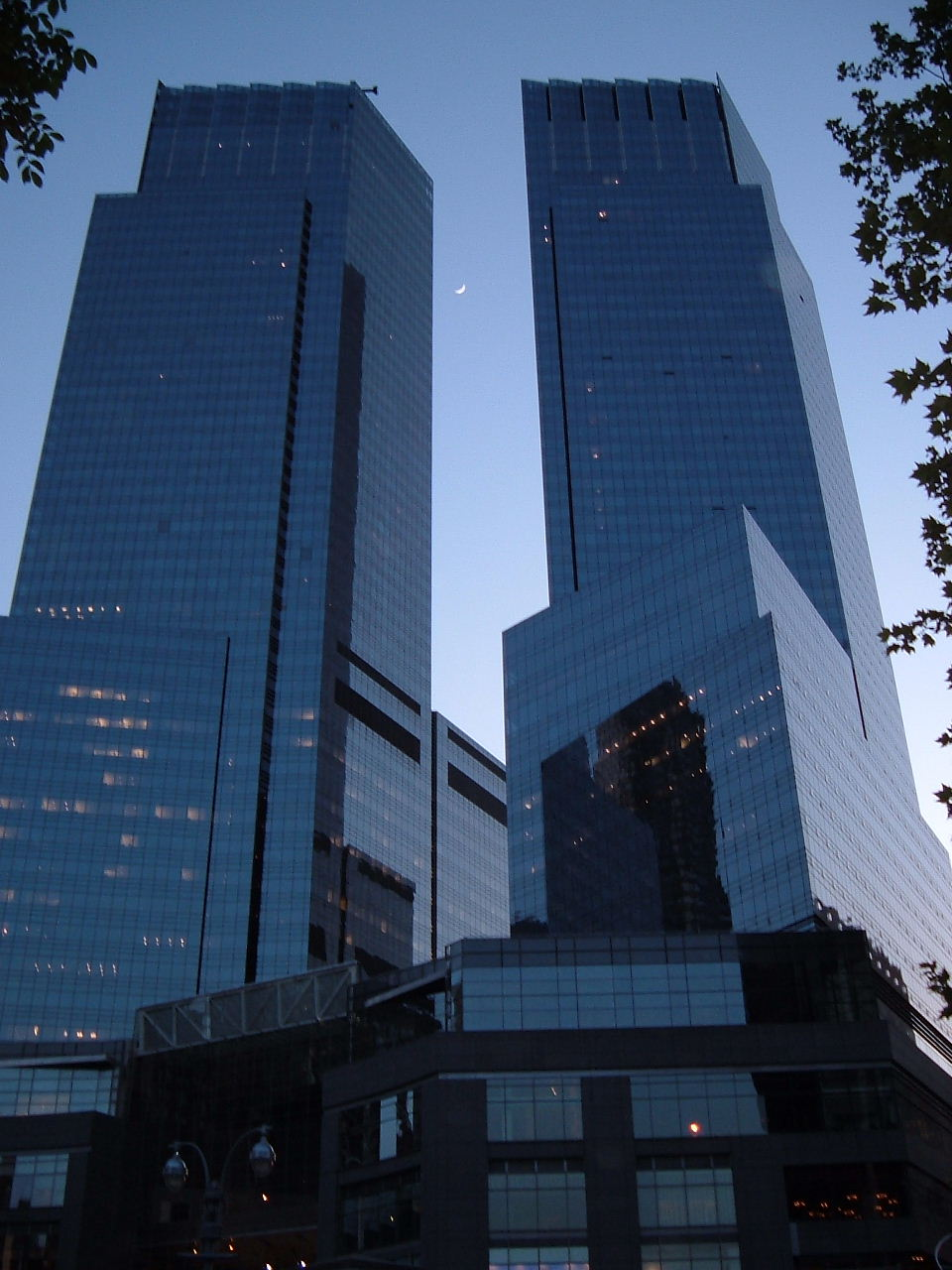
Time Warner Center

Gottesdiener is also involved in some of the city’s most important real estate and design organizations, such as the Real Estate Board of New York, the Metropolitan Museum of Art where he acts as the Vice Chairman of the Real Estate Council, and at his alma mater, The Cooper Union, where he is an advisor for the Dean Search Committee, among many other community initiatives.

- Fellow, American Institute of Architects
- Vice Chairman, Metropolitan Museum of Art Real Estate Council
- Council for Urban Development Mixed Use, Urban Land Institute
- Board member, International Center of Photography
- President’s Advisory Board, Cooper Union
- Member, Council of Tall Buildings and Urban Habitat
- Member, Real Estate Board of New York
- Member, Skyscraper Museum
- Honorary Fellow, Philippine Institute of Architects

== Education ==
- Bachelor of Architecture, 1979, Irwin S. Chanin School of Architecture at The Cooper Union
- Trinity College, 1973–1975
- Pomfret School, 1971-1973

== Awards ==
Presidents Citation in Architecture, Cooper Union

== See also ==
- Skidmore, Owings & Merrill
- David Childs
- Roger Duffy
- William F. Baker (engineer)
- Ross Wimer
- Craig W. Hartman
- Philip Enquist
