= Mark Sarkisian =

American structural engineer

Mark Sarkisian is an American structural engineer. He is the Partner of seismic and structural engineering in the San Francisco office of Skidmore, Owings & Merrill. He is notable for designing many landmark high rise buildings in the United States, China and the Middle East.

== Career ==
Sarkisian has designed over 50 major building projects around the world, including the Embassy of the United States, Beijing, the NBC Tower in Chicago, the Cathedral of Christ the Light, St. Regis Museum Tower a 42-story building in San Francisco, Rolex Tower a 59-story tower in UAE, Zifeng Tower an 89-story building, Tianjin World Financial Center a 74-story building in China, the Jin Mao Tower – currently the fifth tallest building in the world, and the 415-meter-tall (1,362 ft) Al-Hamra Tower in Kuwait.

Sarkisian holds eight U.S. Patents for high-performance seismic structural mechanisms designed to protect buildings in areas of high seismicity and for seismic and environmentally responsible structural systems.

He has published more than 100 papers examining seismic behavior, tall building design, and innovative uses of materials in structures. Over his 25-year-long career, he has received over 50 awards for innovation in structural engineering. He has also received an Honorary Doctorate Degree from Clarkson University. He was elected a member of the National Academy of Engineering in 2021 for innovation in efficient and aesthetic design of tall buildings and structures.

Sarkisian currently teaches an Integrated Studio class that includes students from UC Berkeley, California College of the Arts, Stanford, and Cal Poly which is focused on the collaborative opportunities in design. He received his Bachelor of Science from the University of Connecticut, and his Master of Science from Lehigh University.

== Gallery ==
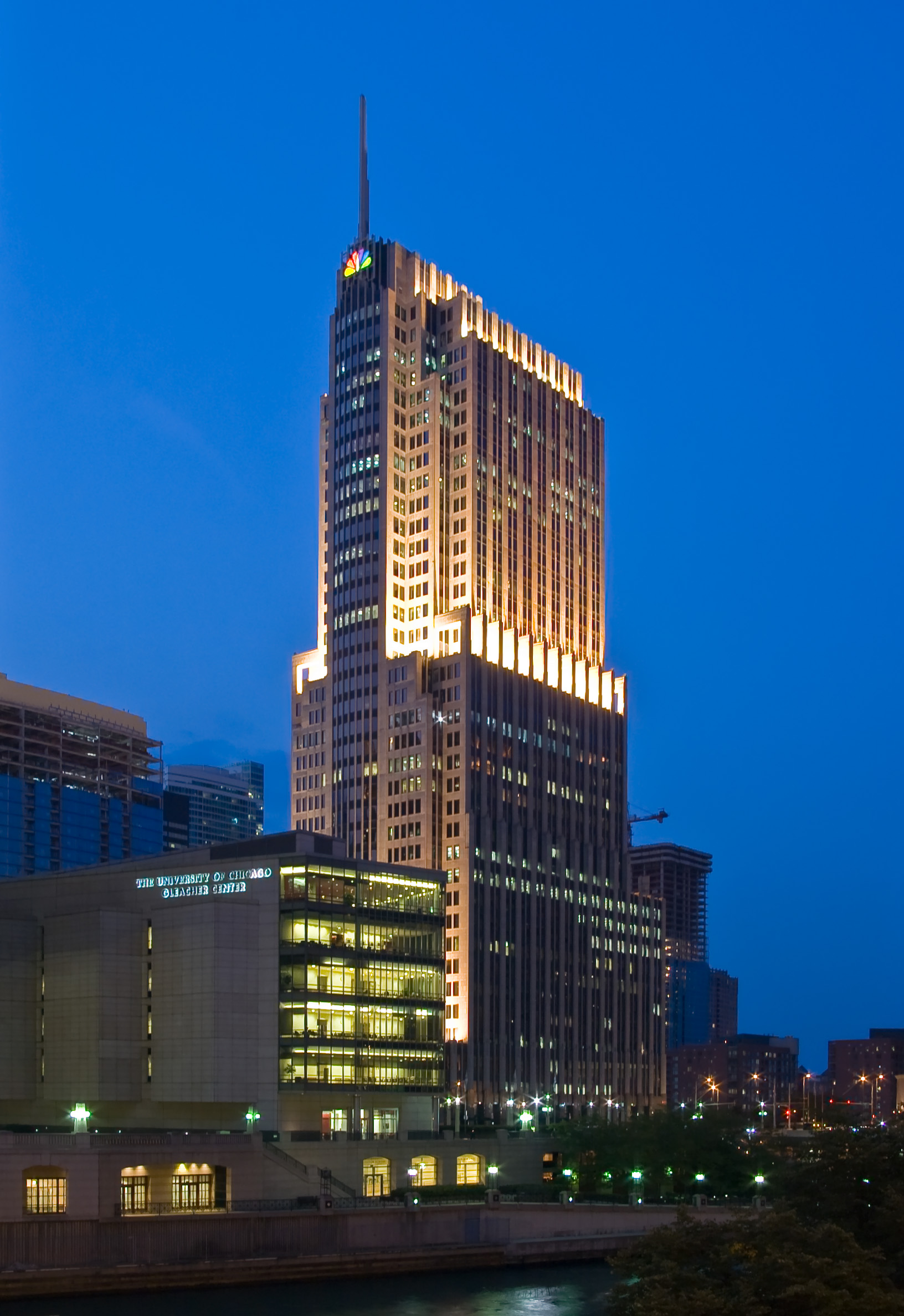

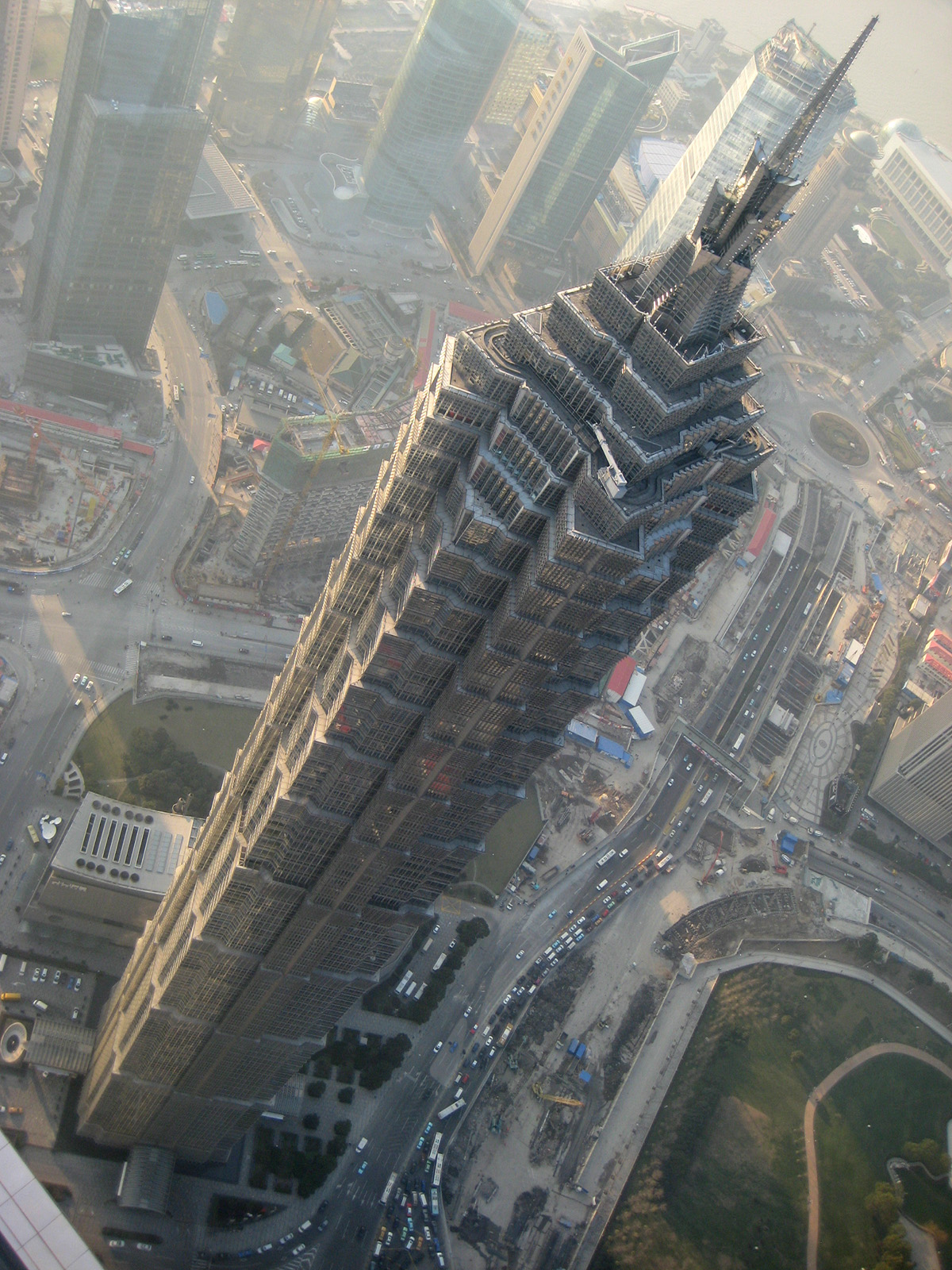

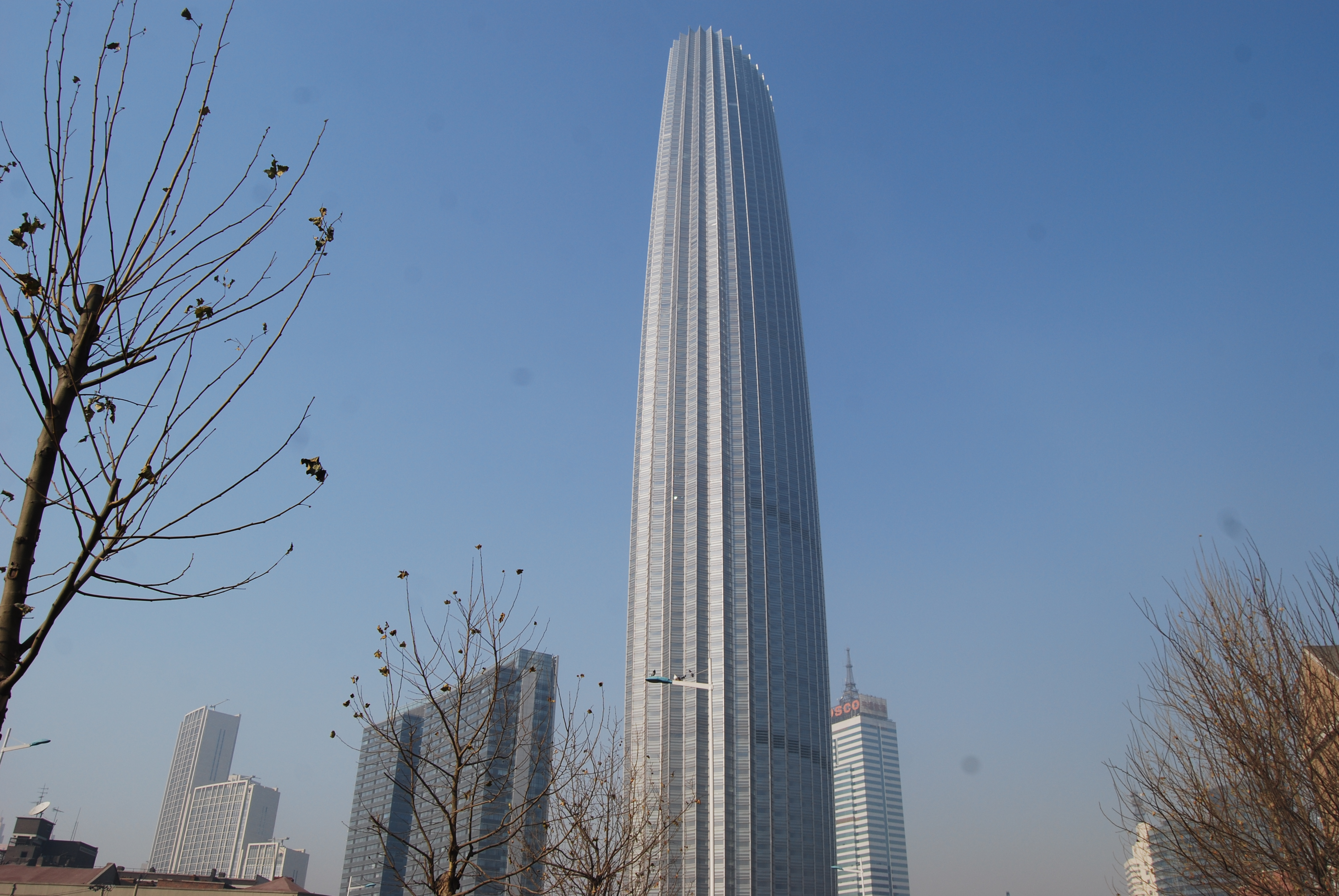

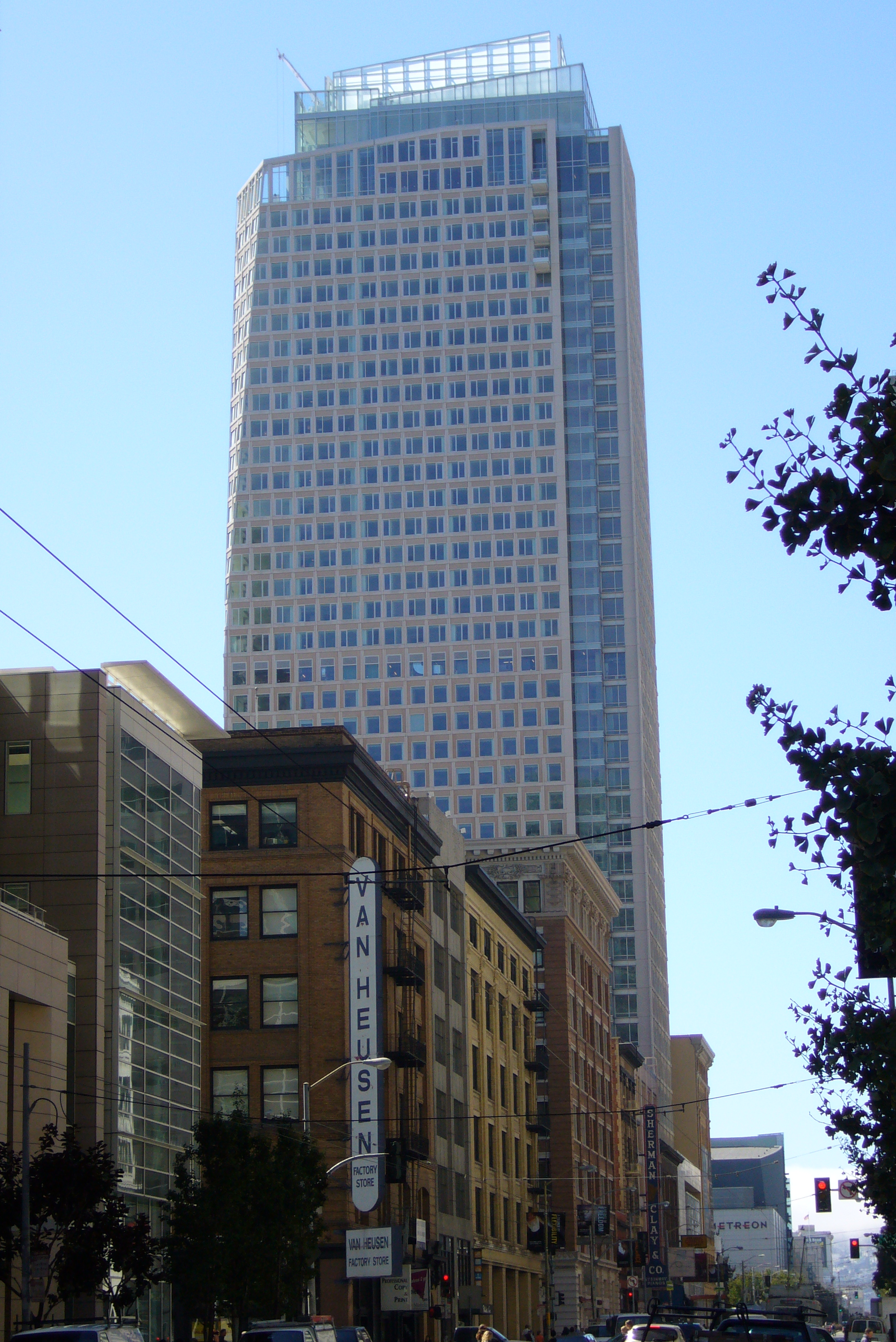

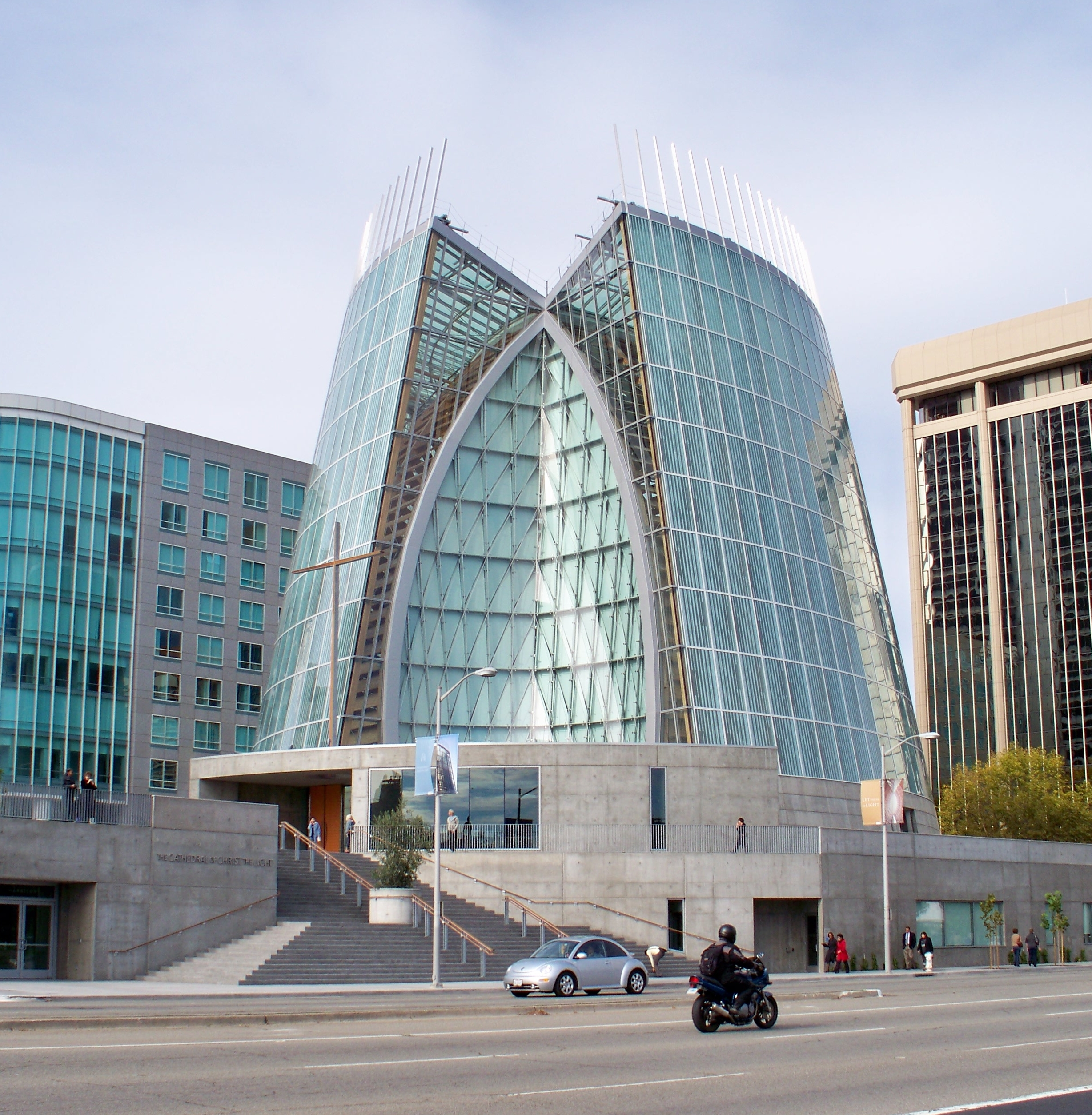

== Publications ==
- BOSWELL, C. K., LONG, E., MATHIAS, N. & SARKISIAN, M. (2010). Jinmao Tower - The Design Integration of Structural Efficiency, Architectural Expression and High Performance Exterior Wall Systems. Presented at the Munich Tall Building Conference 2010. Courtesy of Skidmore, Owings & Merrill LLP, San Francisco, CA, USA.
- DOO C. S., LONG, E., SARKISIAN, M. & SHOOK, D. (2009). Optimization Tools for the Design of Structures. Presented at 2009 SEAOC Convention. Courtesy of Skidmore, Owings & Merrill LLP, San Francisco, CA, USA.
- LEE, P., LONG, E., MATHIAS, N. & SARKISIAN, M. (2009). New Frontiers in the Design of Integrated Exterior Wall Systems. Presented at ASCESEI 2009. Courtesy of Skidmore, Owings & Merrill LLP, San Francisco, CA, USA.

== See also ==
- Fazlur Rahman Khan
- Bill Baker
- Dan M. Frangopol
