= Roger Duffy (architect) =

American architect

- Occupation: Architect
- Practice: Skidmore, Owings & Merrill
- Buildings: Koch Center, Deerfield Academy, Skyscraper Museum
- Projects: World Trade Center site (2002)

Roger Duffy is an American architect, known for rigorous and unconventional approach to design. Now retired, he worked as a partner at the firm Skidmore, Owings & Merrill. He was a design partner in the New York office from 1995 until 2018, and is a member of the American Institute of Architects and the League Circle of the Architectural League of New York.

He received his Bachelor of Architecture from Carnegie Mellon University in 1979. Duffy currently lives with his wife and two children in Stuyvesant Town in New York City.

== Career ==
After graduating from Carnegie Mellon, he attempted to find a job at many firms, eventually arriving in the lobby of SOM's Washington, DC office without an appointment. He was not promised an interview, simply waiting in the lobby for several days before David Childs interviewed him, on the basis of his determination. He worked in Washington for several years, before he moved to New York.

Experimentation and collaboration are evident throughout Roger Duffy's projects worldwide, ranging from his award-winning Upper School and Library at Greenwich Academy, to the new home of the Skyscraper Museum in New York, and the landside terminal at Ben Gurion International Airport. His design for the Kuwait Police Academy was included in the Venice Biennale, “Next”.

He does not work in any particular style, instead choosing a design that is rooted in a deep understanding of the unique qualities of each client's program, site, and aspirations. His interest in making art integral to his designs has led to numerous fruitful collaborations with a wide range of artists, including James Turrell and Robert Whitman, and contributions from Lawrence Wiener.

Duffy received AIA design awards for 350 Madison Avenue, Birch Meadows Tennis Academy, Delbarton School Performing Arts Center, Paterson PS 25, and multiple AIA design awards for Greenwich Academy and Burr Elementary School. He also won a PA award for 350 Madison Avenue. Duffy's buildings have been featured in the New York Times, A + U, International Design Magazine, Metropolis Magazine, House and Garden, and Architectural Record.

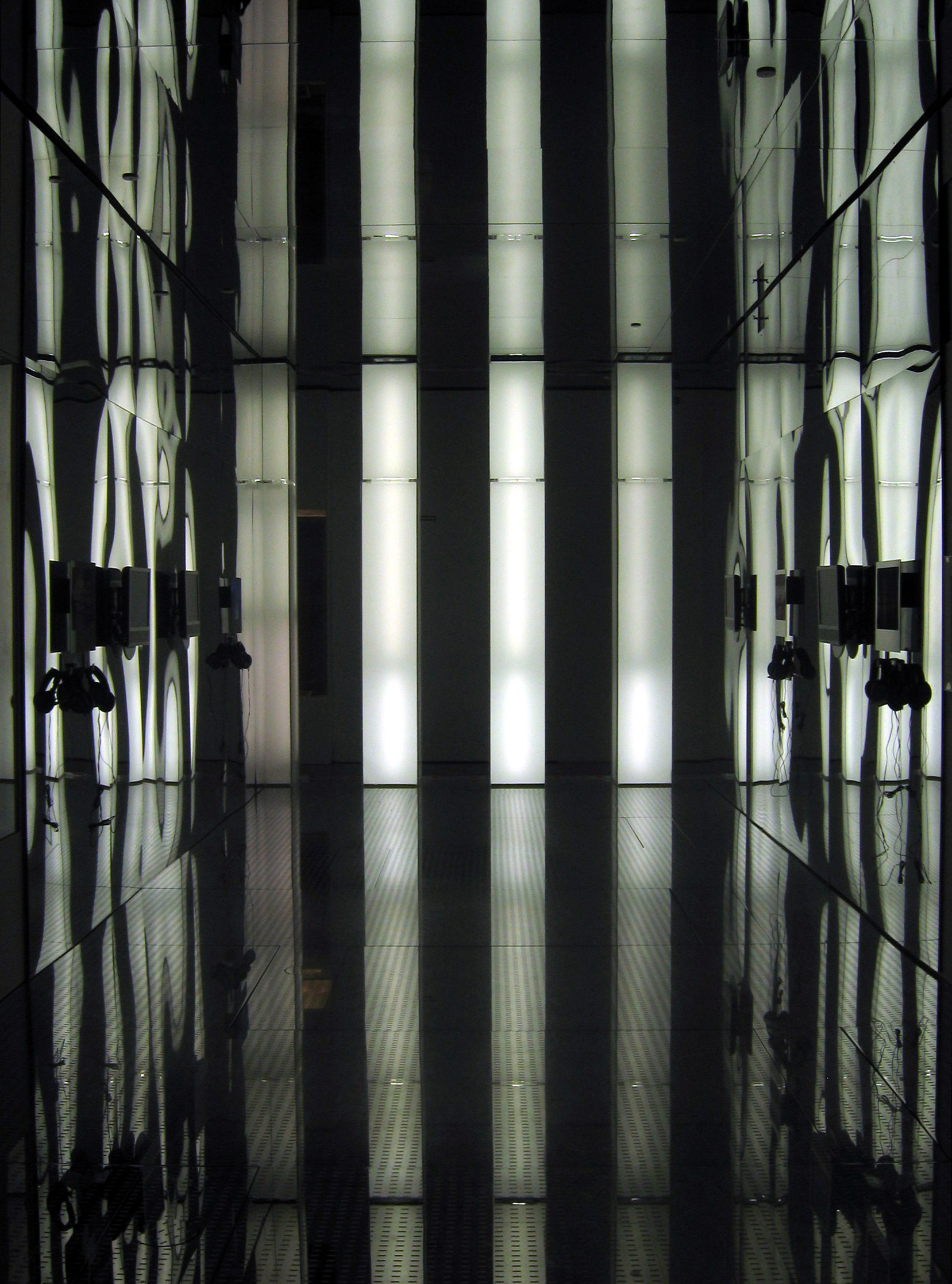
Skyscraper Museum interior

Sustainability is a key aspect of Duffy's design approach. His Koch Center for Science, Mathematics & Technology at Deerfield Academy will receive a Leadership in Energy and Environmental Design (LEED) Gold Certification from the U.S. Green Building Council. To launch the programming and design of the building, Duffy organized a symposium, gathering experts from a variety of fields in a panel discussion. The symposium, a model adapted from the academic world, is characteristic of Duffy's interest in broadening the context in which architecture is conceived.

In his work for schools, colleges, and universities, he looks for unique interventions to develop solutions to campus-wide problems and challenges. Duffy's master planning work at Marist College reflects a long-held interest in campus planning and urban design. Before he begins any project, Duffy studies and analyzes the functionality of the best of that building type. This benchmarking methodology yields to a conceptual process that involves transcending and superseding the current state-of-the-art.

Two of Duffy's most important initiatives are the creation of the campus planning and design studio known as SOM Education Lab and the launching of the SOM Journal, an annually published book of the firm's best work as selected and critiqued by an independent jury of artists, designers, and critics.

=== World Trade Center plans ===
In December 2002, he headed a team that designed a proposal for the rebuilt World Trade Center in New York City. The group developed a complex, intertwined complex of nine bent buildings, interspersed vertically with small pocket parks. It was not well-received, worsened by the fact that Duffy barely spoke about his idea at the general presentation on the 15th of that month, suggesting that he did not have much to say about it. Duffy withdrew SOM from the competition in late January 2003, so that the firm could focus on its other project, 7 World Trade Center.

== Projects ==
- Deerfield Academy natatorium, Deerfield, Massachusetts – 1991
- Deerfield Academy dormitory complex, Deerfield, Massachusetts – 1998
- Ben Gurion International Airport Terminal 3 / Landside Terminal, Tel Aviv, Israel – 2004 (With Ram Karmi and Moshe Safdie)
- The University Center at The New School – 2013

=== As a partner ===
- Greenwich Academy upper School and library – Greenwich, Connecticut – 2002
- Burr Elementary School, Fairfield, Connecticut – 2003
- Kuwait Police Academy, Safat, Kuwait – 2003
- Skyscraper Museum, New York, New York – 2004
- Deerfield Academy, Koch SMT Center, Deerfield, Massachusetts – 2006
- St. Albans School Long Range Capital Plan, Washington, DC – 2007–2020
- Brown University, Sidney Frank Hall, Providence, Rhode Island – 2009

== See also ==
- Skidmore, Owings & Merrill
- David Childs
- William F. Baker (engineer)
- Philip Enquist
- Ross Wimer
- Craig W. Hartman
- T.J. Gottesdiener
