= Philip Enquist =

American architect

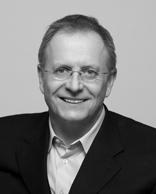
- Occupation: Architect
- Practice: Skidmore, Owings & Merrill
- Projects: Lakeside Master Plan, Chongming Island Master Plan

Philip Enquist, FAIA is a partner in the Chicago office of Skidmore, Owings & Merrill in charge of Urban Design & Planning. He is a Fellow of the American Institute of Architects.

Since joining SOM in 1981, Enquist has focused on strengthening the physical, social, and intellectual infrastructure of cities. He strives to create a framework for humane and rational habitats, workplaces, open spaces and agricultural areas on a rapidly urbanizing planet. Enquist's work emphasizes the rebuilding of inner cities, including commercial centers and neighborhoods; the improvement of infrastructure of city streets and transit; as well as the conservation of the natural environment. He is known for his ability to synthesize the various elements of city design. The focus of his work also extends to regional ecosystems such as North America's Great Lakes region and the Bohai Rim in China.

Enquist is active in the city planning profession through one-on-one mentorships, his instruction of a studio for architecture and urban design students at Harvard University's Graduate School of Design, and as the Charles Moore Visiting Professor at the University of Michigan's Taubman College of Architecture and Urban Planning.

During his career, Mr. Enquist has collaborated closely with a wide cross-section of significant governmental and private planning entities. These include the cities of Shanghai, Detroit, Chicago, Los Angeles and Orlando, Harvard University, Bowdoin College, the Kingdom of Bahrain and others.

Enquist was honored with the 2010 Distinguished Alumnus Award from the Architectural Guild of the University of Southern California (USC) School of Architecture for his dedication to strengthening the physical, social and intellectual infrastructure of cities. In 2009, the Chicago Tribune named him and his studio Chicagoans of the Year in Architecture, citing "the city-friendly designs of Phil Enquist." Enquist was the 2011 commencement speaker for the University of Pennsylvania School of Design.

== Great Lakes Century Vision ==
In 2009, Enquist conceived of a 100-year vision for the Great Lakes and St. Lawrence River basin as SOM's contribution to the Burnham Plan Centennial. Since then, Enquist and SOM's City Design Practice have been refining, promoting and advancing the vision as a pro bono public service to catalyze policymakers, planners and advocates around the environmental and economic renewal of the Great Lakes region.

Enquist has been invited to present SOM's vision to key stakeholders, including the International Joint Commission, over 86 Canadian and American mayors, the National Parks Conservation Association, at the Green Build Expo, The Brookings Institution, The MOWAT Centre for Policy Innovation, the Great Lakes Roundtable, at TEDxMillCity, and on Capitol Hill.

In 2011, the Great Lakes Century vision was awarded a design excellence award from the Chicago Chapter of the American Institute of Architects.

== Education ==
- Bachelor of Science from University of California, 1974
- Master of Architecture from University of Southern California, 1979

== Published work ==
Enquist is a co-author of City Building: Nine Planning Principles for the Twenty-First Century.

== Professional associations ==
- Fellow, American Institute of Architects (FAIA)
- Chair, 1999, AIA Regional/Urban Design PIA
- Vice Chair, 1998 AIA Regional/Urban Design PIA
- Member, Chicago Architecture Foundation
- Board Member, Friends of Downtown Chicago
- Member, Urban Land Institute
- Member, U.S./China Building Council, 1999 and 2000
- Member, Lambda Alpha International
- Board Member, Openlands Project
- Board Member, Design Futures Council
- Board Member, Archeworks

== See also ==
- William F. Baker (engineer)
- George J. Efstathiou (architect)
- Roger Duffy
- T.J. Gottesdiener
- Craig Hartman
- Ross Wimer
