= Core (architecture) =

Architectural term

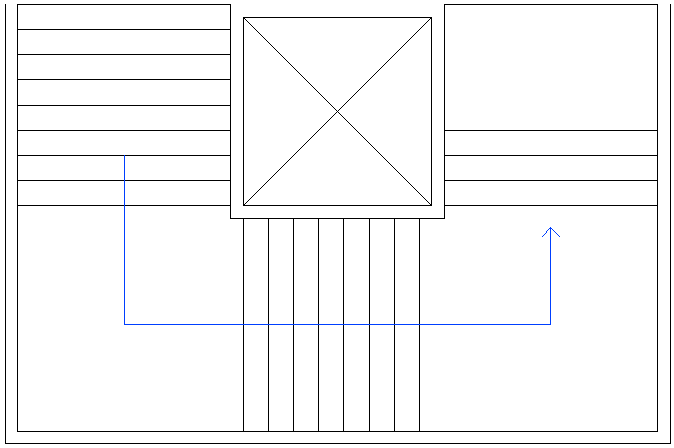
Simple core arrangement – stairs "wrapping around" elevator shaft.

In architecture, a core is a vertical space used for circulation and services. It may also be referred to as a circulation core or service core. A core may include staircases, elevators, electrical cables, water pipes and risers.

A core allows people to move between the floors of a building, and distributes services efficiently to the floors. A core may also serve a key structural role in a building, helping support it and acting as a load-bearing structure with load-bearing walls. Cores in office buildings tend to be larger than those in apartment buildings because office buildings need to handle more traffic with an increased number of elevator shafts. It is generally desirable for a core to be as small as possible to maximize floorspace within the building. The core of a building is often placed in the center of a building, but it can also be placed on a side of a building, and there can be several cores in a building. Cores on a side of a building are known as perimeter cores, are completely inside the building and can allow for more uninterrupted, column-free floor space within a building. Offset cores are similar to perimeter cores but sit partially or completely outside a building. Cores split into several smaller cores are called mixed cores. A large portion (over 40&) of offset core buildings were built after 2010. An offset core can also be used to provide shade from the sun.

== See also ==
- Buttressed core
- Skyscraper design and construction
