= Buttressed core =

Structural system for high buildings

A buttressed core is a structural system for high buildings, consisting of a hexagonal core reinforced by three buttresses that form a Y shape.

The buttressed core was invented by the Skidmore, Owings & Merrill engineer Bill Baker. It was first used in Tower Palace III in Seoul, South Korea, completed in 2004. Its ability to support higher buildings than ever before was demonstrated by the Burj Khalifa in Dubai, completed in 2009. Jeddah Tower in Jeddah, Saudi Arabia, is under construction as of January 2025, and estimated to be completed in 2028 or 2029. It was planned for the never-built Crown Las Vegas in Las Vegas.

== Properties ==
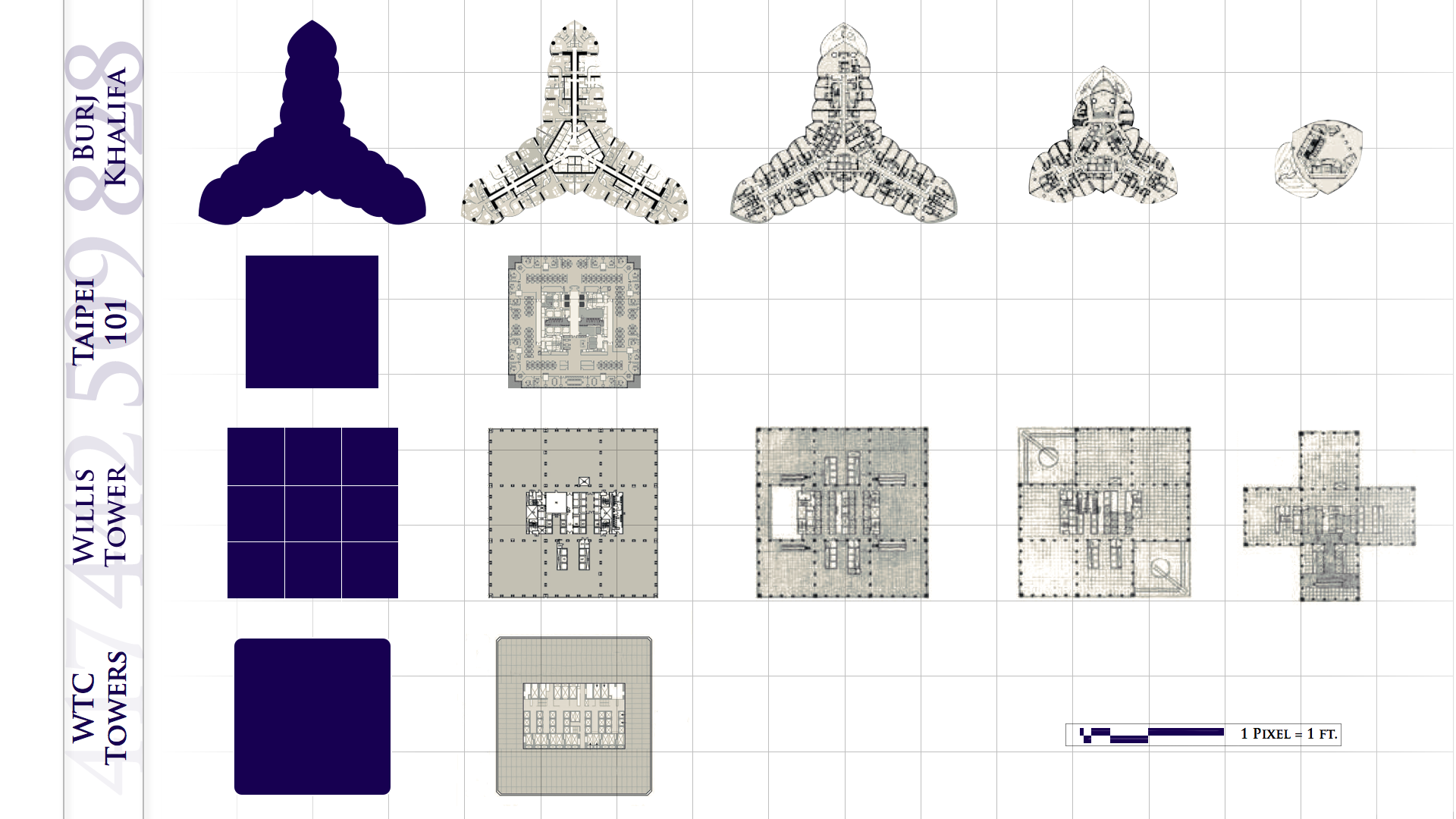
A cross-section of comparisons of various towers, from ground level from top to bottom: Burj Khalifa, Taipei 101, Willis Tower, and the original World Trade Center

The buttressed core supports itself both laterally and torsionally. It eliminates the need for column transfers, and moves loads in a smooth path from the building's top into its foundations.

It offers several advantages over traditional methods:

- Stability: It provides excellent resistance to lateral forces, such as wind and seismic activities, increasing the overall stability of the building.
- Efficiency: The system allows for a more efficient use of materials, reducing the overall weight and cost of the structure.
- Flexibility: It enables architects and engineers to design taller and more slender buildings without compromising on structural integrity.
- Aesthetics: The Y-shaped design offers unique architectural possibilities, contributing to the visual appeal of skyscrapers.

It also has some drawbacks:

- Complexity: The design and construction process can be more complex and require specialized knowledge and skills.
- Cost: Initial costs may be higher due to the need for precise engineering and high-quality materials.

== See also ==
- Core (architecture)
