= Circulation (architecture) =

How people move through and interact with a building

In architecture, circulation refers to the way people move through and interact with a building. In public buildings, circulation is of high importance; structures such as elevators, escalators, and staircases are often referred to as circulation elements, as they are positioned and designed to optimize the flow of people through a building, sometimes through the use of a core.

In some situations, one-way circulation is desirable.
