= Harrison Fraker =

American architecture and urban design professor

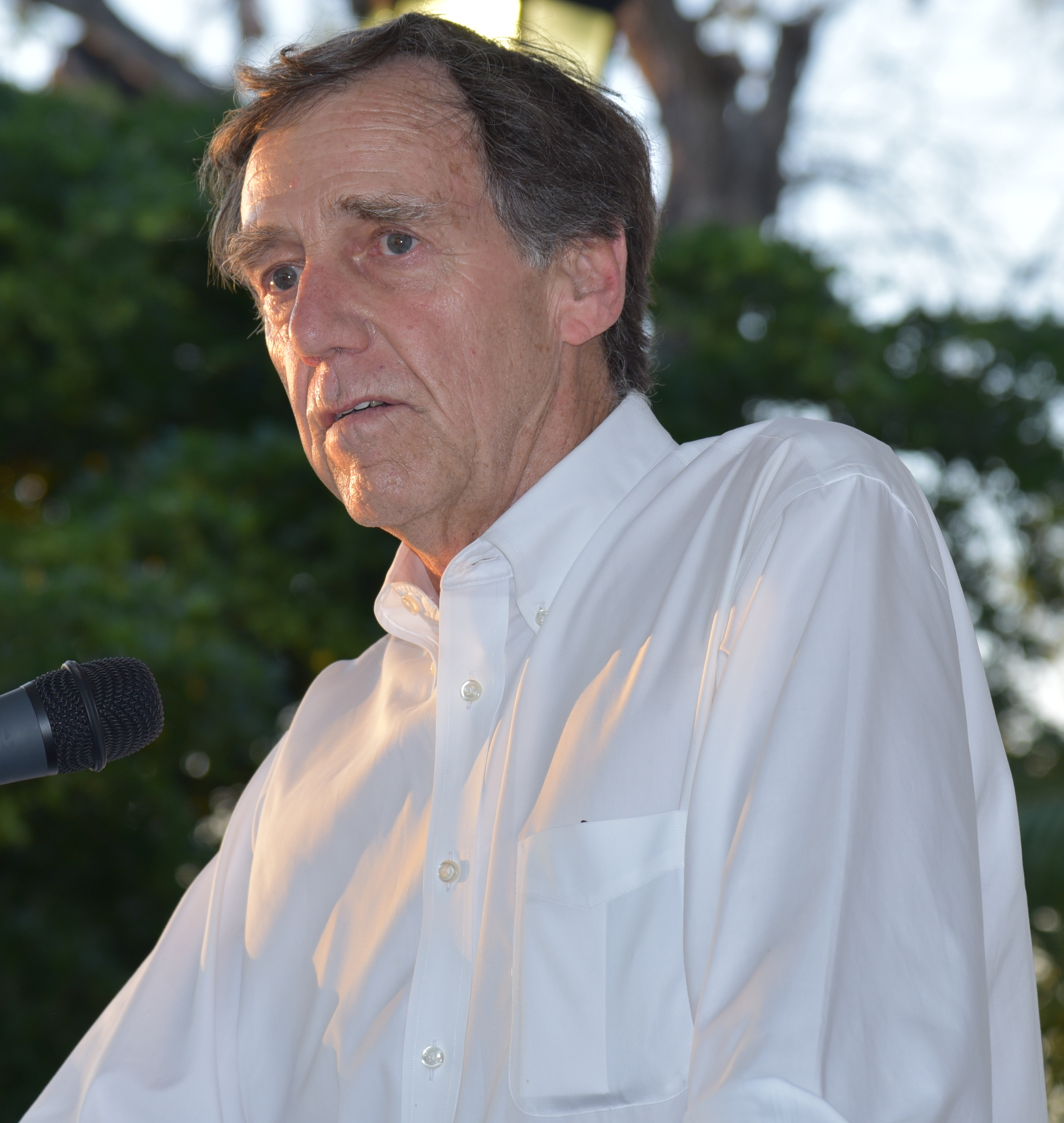
Fraker in 2017

Harrison Fraker, FAIA is a professor of Architecture and Urban Design, and the former Dean of the UC Berkeley College of Environmental Design.

Recognized as a pioneer in passive solar, daylighting and sustainable research, Harrison Fraker was educated at Princeton University and Cambridge University. Prior to his tenure at UC Berkeley he was the founding dean of the University of Minnesota College of Architecture and Landscape Architecture. In 2010, his architectural work was centered on developing new Chinese cities and transit-focused, self-sufficient neighborhoods in Tianjin, a city of 11 million.

== Awards ==
- Distinguished Service Medal from the College of Architecture and Landscape Architecture at the University of Minnesota
- Fellow in the American Institute of Architects
- Design Futures Council Senior Fellow

== Works ==
- Foreign Studies: Architecture (1985)
