= Skyscraper Museum =

Architecture museum in Manhattan, New York

Coordinates: 40°42′20″N 74°1′3″W

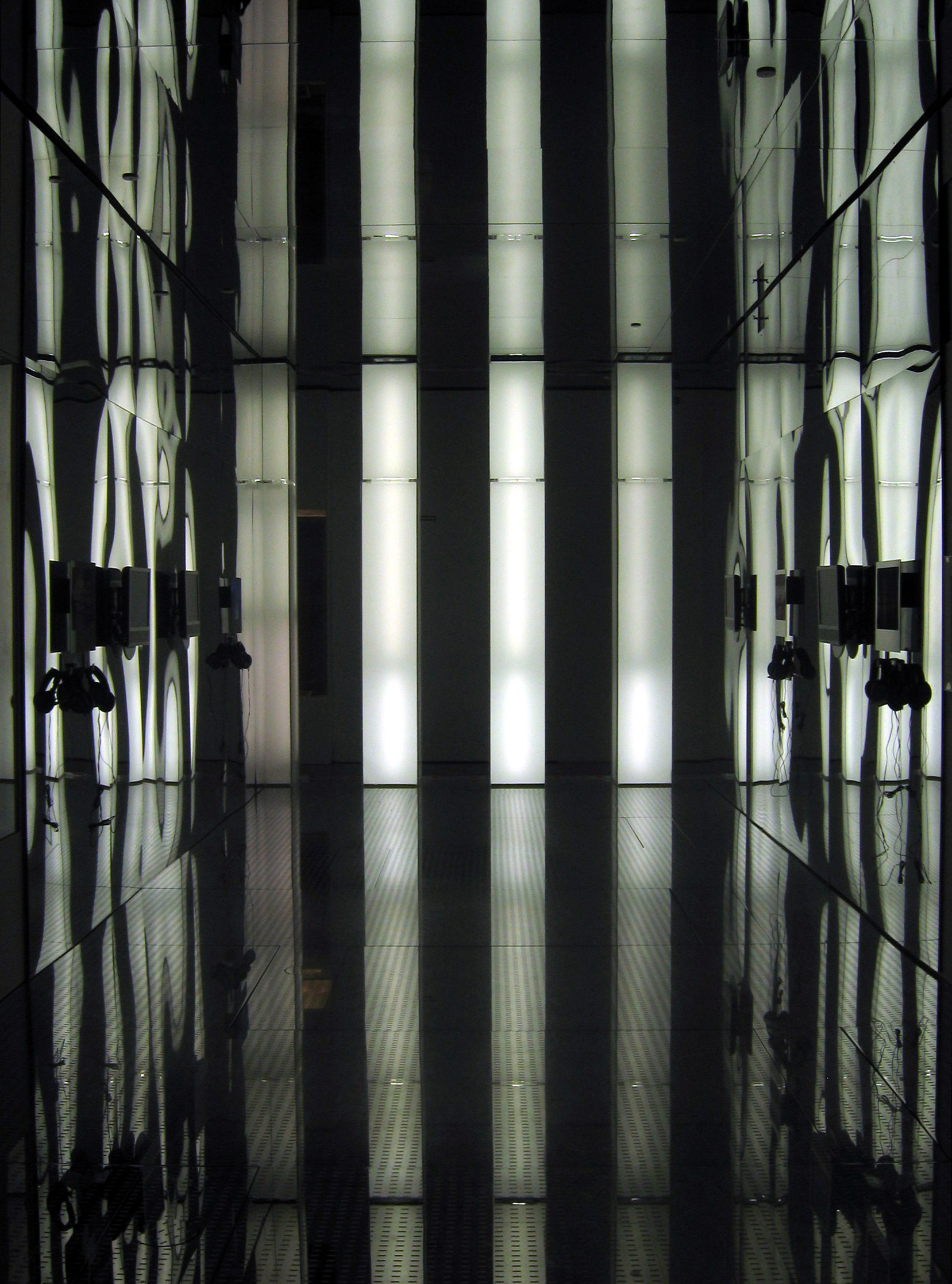
Skyscraper Museum interior view

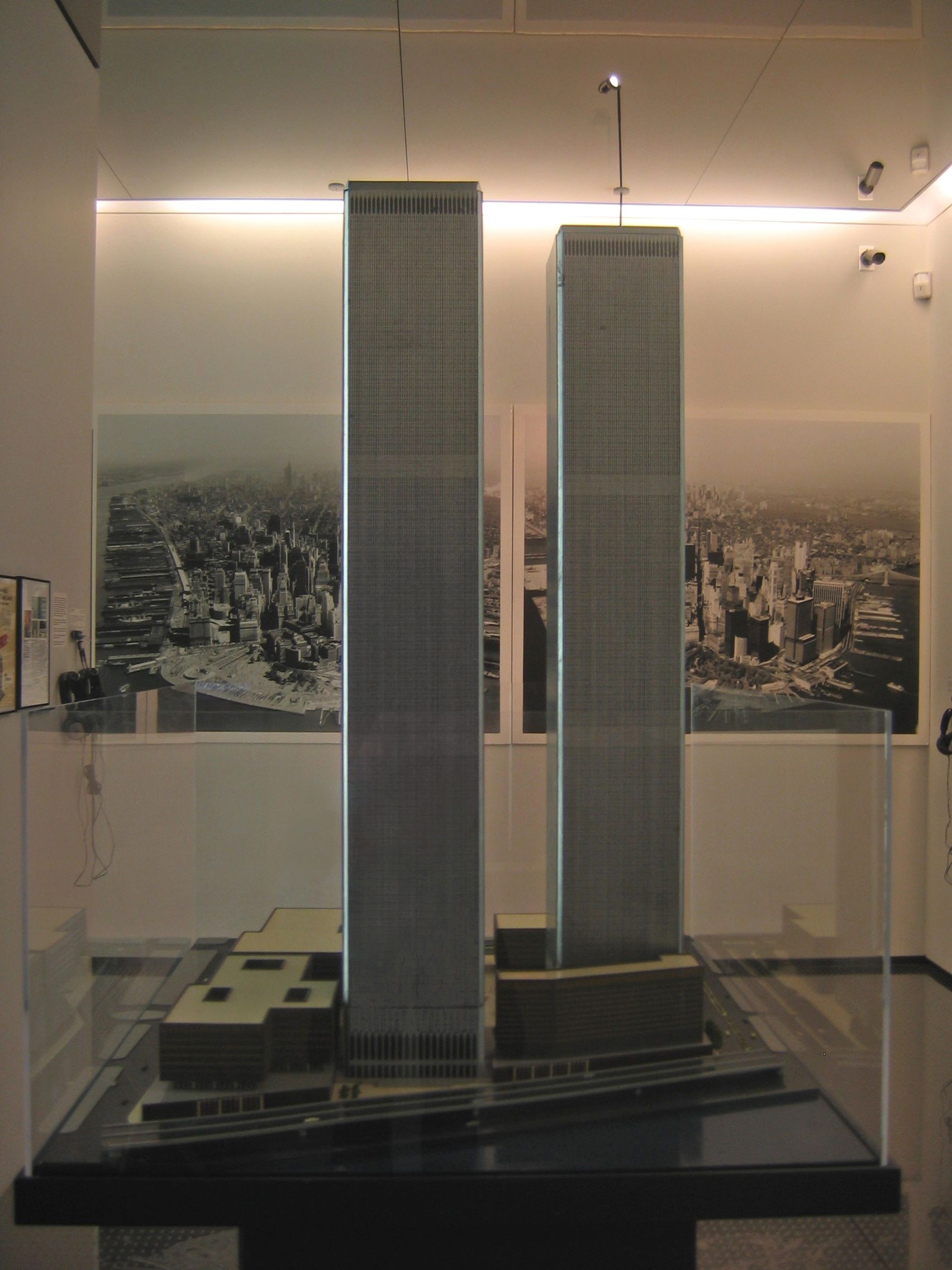
World Trade Center architectural model on exhibit at the museum

The Skyscraper Museum is an architecture museum in the Battery Park City neighborhood of Manhattan in New York City, founded in 1996. The museum focuses on high-rise buildings as "products of technology, objects of design, sites of construction, investments in real estate, and places of work and residence." The Skyscraper Museum also celebrates the architectural heritage of New York and the forces and people who created New York's skyline. Before moving to the current and permanent location in Battery Park City in 2004, the museum was a nomadic institution, holding pop-up exhibitions in four temporary donated spaces around Lower Manhattan since 1996.

The Skyscraper Museum was founded and is directed by Carol Willis, a professor of architectural history and urban studies at Columbia University. It includes two exhibition spaces for both permanent and temporary exhibitions, a bookstore, and a mezzanine with its office, situated above the bookstore. The museum can be reached by a ramp starting from the basement.

== Move after September 11, 2001 ==
The original site of the museum was located very close to the World Trade Center. After the September 11 attacks, the museum was forced to close temporarily as its space was commandeered as an emergency information center.

In March 2004, the museum reopened in its new permanent home at 39 Battery Place in the neighborhood of Battery Park City at the southern tip of Manhattan. It was the first museum to open in Lower Manhattan after the September 11 attacks. The museum occupies an area of 5,800 square feet (540 m^{2}) on the ground-floor of a mixed-use building, that was donated by the developer. The new site was designed by Roger Duffy of Skidmore, Owings & Merrill, working pro bono. The architect tried to amplify the indoor height of the museum, which is 10 feet (3.0 m). This was arranged by using polished covers of stainless steel on the floors and ceilings, giving the illusion of an infinite vertical space.

== Selected exhibitions ==
On September 6, 2006, the museum opened an exhibit on the construction of the World Trade Center and the complex's subsequent history. The exhibit includes the original architectural/engineering model of the World Trade Center.

On June 24, 2009, the museum opened China Prophecy: Shanghai, a multi-media exhibition that examines Shanghai's evolving identity as a skyscraper metropolis. Featuring models of the major iconic structures, including Jin Mao, Tomorrow Square, Shanghai World Financial Center, and the new super-tall Shanghai Tower, as well as computer animations, film, drawings, and historic and contemporary photography of the city, the exhibition combines an in-depth look at the new generation of towers with an overview of the sweeping transformation of the city's traditional low-rise landscape into a city of towers.

In 2011, the Skyscraper Museum opened a new exhibit called "Supertall!" dedicated to the tallest buildings in the world, those that stand at least 381 meters (1,250 ft), the height of the Empire State Building. The exhibit features qualifying buildings built since 2001 to those that will be built by 2016 as a commemoration of and to demonstrate the irony of the recent popularity of the skyscraper in many countries, despite sentiment that after the September 11 attacks there would be no more desire to live or work in or to build skyscrapers.

Besides in-house exhibitions, the museum also sponsors external shows and programs at various locations in the city. Additionally, the museum offers a unique virtual gallery through its website, which is an advanced 3-D archive of Manhattan skyscrapers.

== See also ==
- List of museums and cultural institutions in New York City
- Museum of Jewish Heritage
