= Craig W. Hartman =

Craig W. Hartman, FAIA, is an architect and Design Partner in Skidmore, Owings & Merrill's San Francisco, California, office. His most prominent work includes the Cathedral of Christ the Light for the Roman Catholic Diocese of Oakland. It is the first cathedral in the world built entirely in the 21st century. He also completed the International Terminal at the San Francisco International Airport, Harvard University's Northwest Science Building, and the new US Embassy in Beijing.

== Biography ==
Hartman was born in Indianapolis, Indiana, and graduated from Wolf Lake High School in 1968. He enrolled in Ball State University's College of Architecture & Planning and spent a year studying under Cedric Price at The Architectural Association in London. After graduating from Ball State in 1973, Hartman started his career at SOM in Chicago. He has served as a Design Partner in SOM's Houston and Washington, D.C. offices prior to joining the San Francisco office as an architectural Design Partner for SOM's West Coast operations in 1990.

In 2001, Hartman became the youngest recipient of the AIA California Council's Maybeck Award—an Individual Honor Award for Outstanding Achievement expressed in a body of work. In September 2008, Hartman received the Vatican's Knighthood for Service to Society (St. Sylvester) from Pope Benedictus XVI during the dedication ceremony for The Cathedral of Christ the Light. He is a member of the AIA's College of Fellows and a Design Futures Council Senior Fellow.

He received an Honorary Doctor of the Arts Degree, conferred by Ball State University, during the school's 2009 commencement ceremony. He also received an Honorary Doctor of the Arts Degree from DePaul University in 2017.

== See also ==
- David Childs
- William F. Baker (engineer)
- Ross Wimer
- Roger Duffy
- T.J. Gottesdiener
- Philip Enquist
