= David Childs =

American architect (1941–2025)

- Born: David Magie Childs; April 1, 1941; Princeton, New Jersey, U.S.
- Died: March 26, 2025 (aged 83); Pelham, New York, U.S.
- Education: Yale School of Architecture
- Occupation: Architect
- Employer: Skidmore, Owings & Merrill
- Known for: One World Trade Center
- Spouse: Anne Woolman Reeve (m. 1963)
- Children: 3

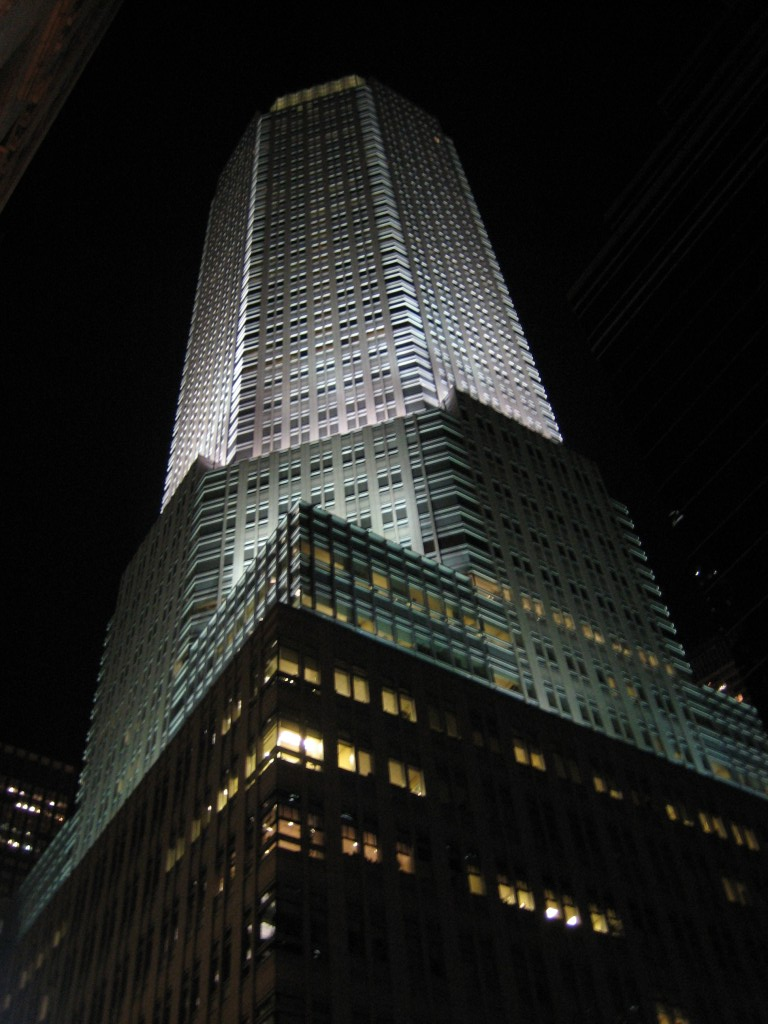
383 Madison Avenue at night

David Magie Childs (April 1, 1941 – March 26, 2025) was an American architect and chairman of the architectural firm Skidmore, Owings & Merrill. He was the architect of record for One World Trade Center in New York City, which became the Western Hemisphere's tallest skyscraper when it was completed in 2014.

== Early life and education ==
Childs graduated from Deerfield Academy in Deerfield, Massachusetts, in 1959 and from Yale University in New Haven, Connecticut in 1963. He first majored in zoology before he then turned to architecture at the Yale School of Architecture and earned his master's degree in 1967.

== Career ==
Childs joined the Washington, D.C., office of SOM in 1971, after working with Nathaniel Owings and Daniel Patrick Moynihan on plans for the redevelopment of Pennsylvania Avenue. Childs was a design partner of the firm in Washington until 1984, when he moved to SOM's New York Office.

His major projects include: in Washington, D.C., 1201 Pennsylvania Avenue, the Four Seasons Hotel, master plans for the National Mall, the U.S. News & World Report headquarters, and the headquarters for National Geographic; in New York City, Worldwide Plaza, 450 Lexington Avenue, Bertelsmann Tower, and One World Trade Center; and internationally, the Embassy of the United States, Ottawa, and the Changi international terminal in Singapore.

Childs served as the chairman of the National Capital Planning Commission from 1975 to 1981 and he was appointed to the U.S. Commission of Fine Arts in 2002, serving as chairman from 2003 to 2005. He was the recipient of a Rome Prize in 2004; named a senior fellow of the Design Futures Council in 2010; and served on the boards of the Municipal Art Society, the Museum of Modern Art, and the American Academy in Rome.

== Skidmore, Owings & Merrill projects ==
=== Washington, D.C. (1971–1985) ===
- Metro Center (1976)
- Formerly the Daon Building, now the Inter-American Development Bank, 1300 New York Avenue, NW (1984)
- National Geographic headquarters M Street building (1985)
- Four Seasons (1979), Regent, and Park Hyatt Washington (1986) hotels
- Expansion of the Dulles Airport main terminal
- U.S. News & World Report headquarters
- University Yard, 1985–1986 restoration, The George Washington University

=== New York City (1984–2025) ===
==== Completed ====
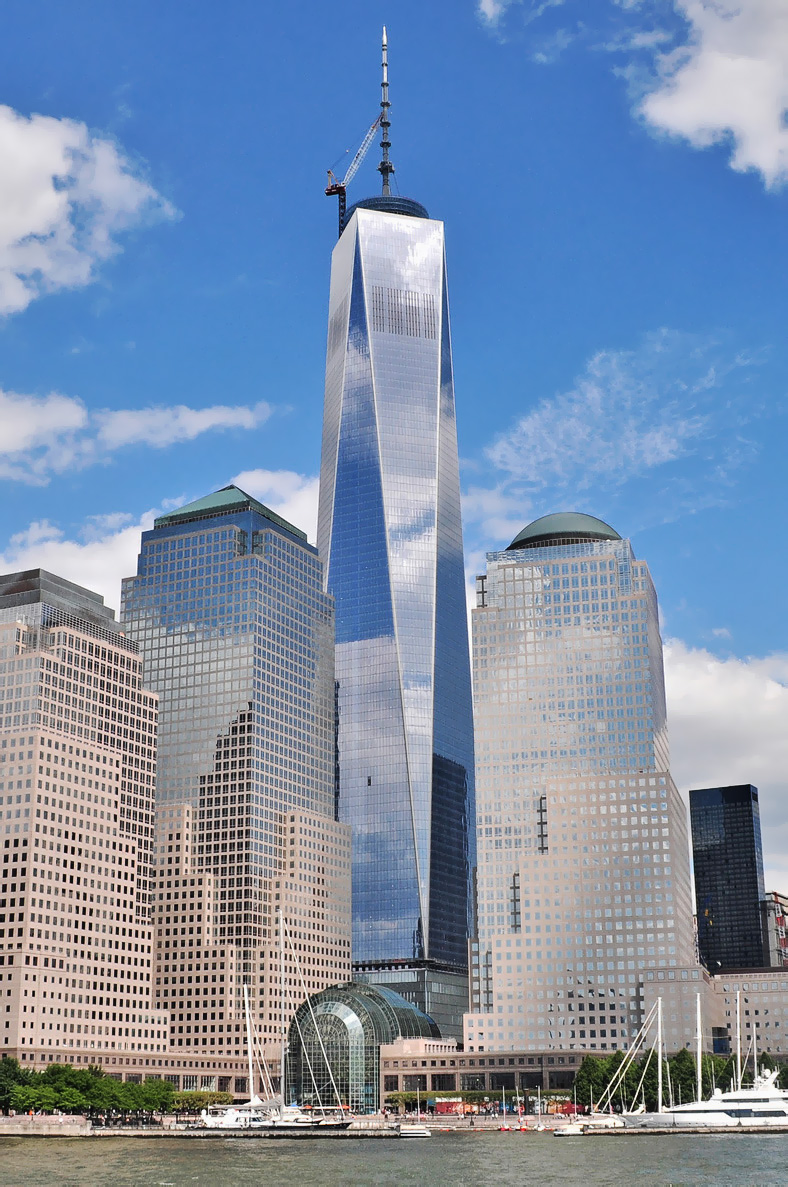
One World Trade Center

- Worldwide Plaza, 825 8th Avenue (1989)
- Bertelsmann Building, 1540 Broadway (1990)
- 383 Madison Avenue (2002)
- Time Warner Center, Columbus Circle (2003)
- Times Square Tower, 7 Times Square (2004)
- 7 World Trade Center, 250 Greenwich Street (2006)
- One World Trade Center (2014)
- 450 Lexington Avenue (over the Grand Central Station Post Office at Grand Central Terminal)
- One North End Avenue, 300 Vesey Street (1997)
- JFK International Airport Arrivals Building
- New Pennsylvania Station (Moynihan Train Hall) at James Farley Post Office Building

==== Planned ====
- New New York Stock Exchange
- Renovation of Lever House, 390 Park Avenue
- 400 Lake Shore

=== Other locations ===
- Embassy of the United States in Ottawa, 1999

== Personal life and death ==
Childs married Anne Woolman Reeve (known as Annie) in 1963. The couple had three children – Joshua, Nicholas, and Jocelyn. They resided in Manhattan and Keene, New York.

Childs died of Lewy body dementia in Pelham, New York, on March 26, 2025, at the age of 83. He had been diagnosed in September 2024.

== See also ==
- William F. Baker (engineer)
- Roger Duffy
- T.J. Gottesdiener
- Craig W. Hartman
- Ross Wimer
