= White Magnolia Plaza =

Supertall skyscraper in Shanghai, China

- 北外滩国际客运中心/白玉兰大厦
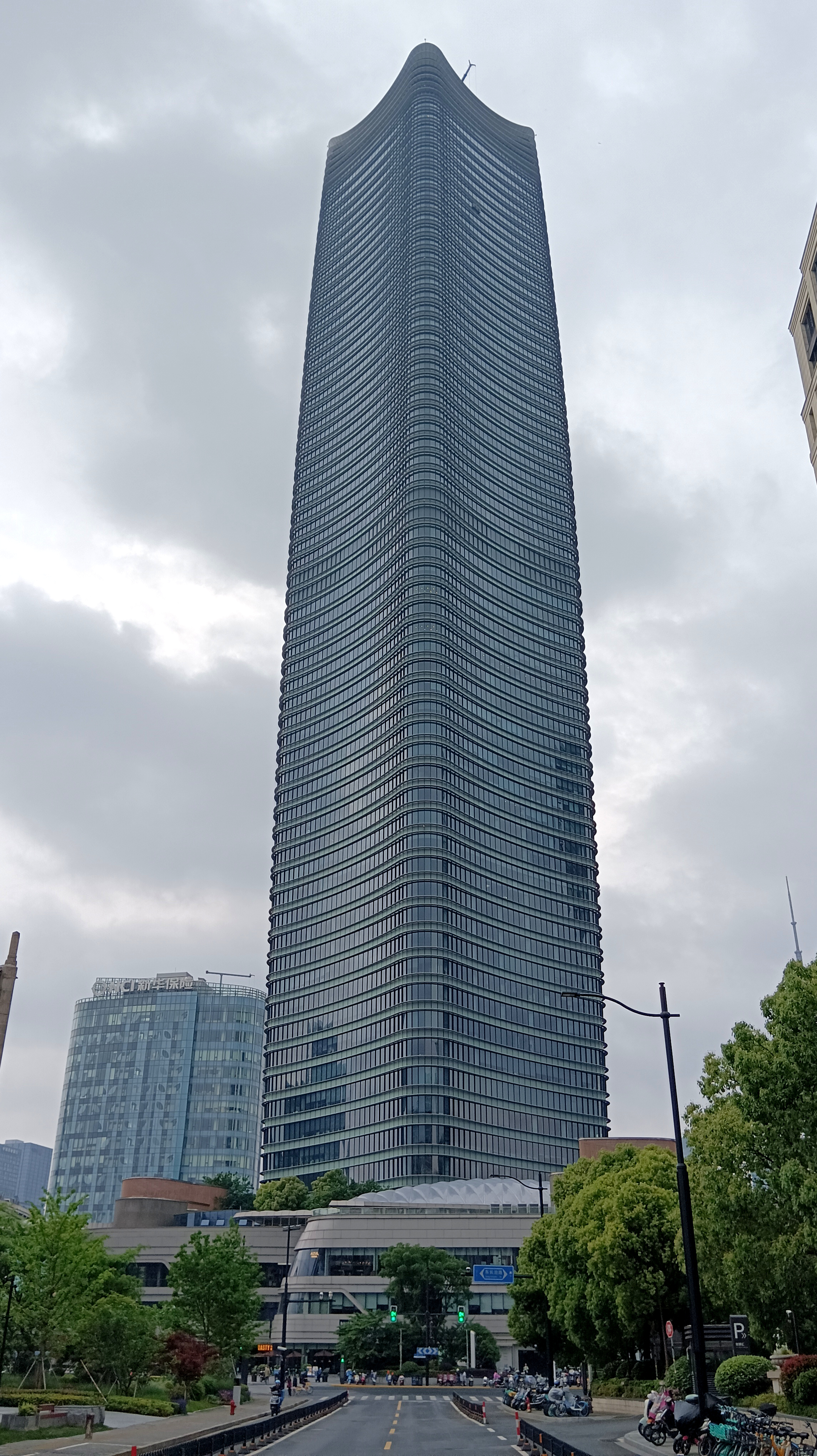
- White Magnolia Plaza in 2024
- Interactive map of the White Magnolia Plaza area

General information
- Status: Completed
- Type: Office
- Location: Dongdaming Road, Hongkou District, Shanghai, China
- Coordinates: 31°15′4″N 121°29′37″E
- Construction started: September 27, 2008
- Completed: January 4, 2017
- Owner: Sinar Mas Land

Height
- Roof: 319.5 metres (1,048 ft)

Technical details
- Floor count: 65

Design and construction
- Architect: Skidmore, Owings & Merrill

The White Magnolia Plaza, also known as Sinar Mas Center, is a skyscraper whose construction was initially suspended but resumed and was constructed in 2013, and was completed on January 4, 2017. It is located north of the Bund, the historic riverfront district of Shanghai, adjacent to the international cruise terminal. The original proposal called for a 388-meter (1,273-foot) tower, but it was later scaled down to 260 meters (850 feet), and the final design was changed to 319.5 meters (1,048 feet).

The building is owned by Sinar Mas Land, a subsidiary of Indonesian conglomerate Sinar Mas Group.

== See also ==
- List of tallest buildings
- List of tallest buildings in Shanghai
