= George J. Efstathiou =

American architect

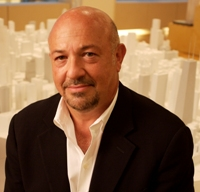
- Occupation: Architect
- Practice: Skidmore, Owings & Merrill LLP
- Buildings: Burj Khalifa, Infinity Tower, Rolex Tower
- Projects: Broadgate

George J. Efstathiou, FAIA, RIBA is an American architect of Greek descent. George joined Skidmore, Owings and Merrill, LLP (SOM) in 1974, where he served as Managing Partner and later Consulting Partner in the Chicago office until 2016. He is currently leading the consulting practice of Efstathiou Consulting LLC which serves clients in the architecture, planning, interiors design as well as others in the real estate and corporate communities.

As Managing Partner at SOM, George led numerous mixed-use projects throughout the world, including the United States, the United Kingdom, Brazil, Canada, People's Republic of China, Hungary, Korea, Malaysia, Indonesia, Russia, Lebanon, Bahrain, Saudi Arabia, Qatar, Oman and the United Arab Emirates. George lectures frequently on projects, particularly the Burj Khalifa and served as Managing Partner and Chief Architect for the world's tallest building.

As much of his most noted work was focused in the Middle East in the later stages of his career, he was named one of the six most influential architects in Saudi Arabia by Middle East Economic Digest (MEED) 2010, Architect of the Year in 2011 by Middle East Architect Magazine and one of the top ten influential international architects in the Middle East by designMENA in 2015.

He was honored with Fellowship for the American Institute of Architects(FAIA) in 2009 which is given to the top few percent in the architecture profession in the US and is one of the few US architects holding a coveted membership in the Royal Institute of British Architects (RIBA).

When George’s career with Skidmore, Owings and Merrill, LLP began in 1974, his first 10 years with the firm focused primarily on domestic projects, including work in Boston, Los Angeles and Chicago. George began his international focus in 1985, when he was a part of the SOM team that designed a 6,000,000-square-foot (560,000 m^{2}) Broadgate project over the air rights of the Liverpool Street Station in London. In order to follow through of the management and execution of the Broadgate project, in 1989 George relocated from Chicago to live and work in London for two years. During his time in London, he studied and gained a full understanding, knowledge and experience of the U.K. practice methods and techniques for the delivery of professional architectural services which, next to the U.S. techniques, are widely used around the world. It is here where George was able to obtain his licensure in the U.K.

In the Middle East he was responsible for projects such as Rolex Tower, Cayan Tower, Mashreq Bank Headquarters and Burj Khalifa all in Dubai, United Arab Emirates.

== Education ==
- University of Illinois at Chicago, Bachelor of Architecture, 1974
- Lane Technical High School, 1969

== Professional associations ==
- Registered Architect in Illinois, New York, Arizona, Colorado, Florida, Hawaii, Massachusetts, Missouri, New Mexico, Ohio, South Carolina, Texas and Virginia
- National Council of Architectural Registration Boards (NCARB)
- Architectural Registration Council of the United Kingdom
- Fellow, American Institute of Architects (AIA)
- Royal Institute of British Architects (RIBA)
- University of Illinois, Chicago, School of Architecture Advisory Board, Member
- Urban Land Institute, Member
- City Club of Chicago, Member
- Executive Club of Chicago, Member

== Committees ==
- University of Illinois, Chicago, Ill. (Present) College of Art & Architecture Visiting Committee. The board position was established to advise the College with particular emphasis on the School of Architecture.
- University of Illinois, Chicago, Ill. (2000–2005) School of Architecture Advisory Board. The board position was established to advise the School of Architecture.

== Key projects ==
- Burj Khalifa
- Infinity Tower
- Rolex Tower
- Mashreq Bank Headquarters
- Virginia Beach Convention Center, Virginia Beach, USA
- The Montgomery Residential Project, Chicago, Illinois
- BankBoston, São Paulo, Brazil
- Plaza Rakyat, Kuala Lumpur, Malaysia
- Symphony Center, Orchestra Hall Renovation, Chicago, Illinois
- Bahrain National Planning Development Strategy, Kingdom of Bahrain
- Burj Al Oula, Al Khobar, Saudi Arabia
- Korea World Trade Center, Seoul, Korea
- Virginia Beach Performing Arts Center, Virginia Beach, Virginia
- Virginia Beach 19th Street Corridor, Virginia Beach, USA
- United Airlines World Headquarters & Corporate Campus, Chicago, Illinois
- Metropolitan Financial Corporation, Cleveland, Ohio
- Russia Tower, Moscow, Russia
- Sonnenschein Nath & Rosenthal, St. Louis, Missouri & Washington D.C.
- Commonwealth Expansion, Chicago, Illinois
- USG Building, Chicago, Illinois
- Brompton Cross, London, United Kingdom
- Stockley Park Consortium, Ltd., Uxbridge, United Kingdom
- Ludgate Development, London, United Kingdom
- Broadgate Development, London, United Kingdom
- 75 State Street, Boston, Massachusetts
- Kings Cross, London, United Kingdom
- Natural Gas Pipeline Company of America, Lombard, Illinois
- Citicorp Plaza, Los Angeles, California
- 211 East Ohio Street, Chicago, Illinois
- Atrium One, Cincinnati, Ohio
- The Bay Club, Boston, Massachusetts
- 60 State Street, Boston, Massachusetts
- Belgrade Tower, Belgrade, Serbia

== See also ==
- Skidmore, Owings & Merrill
