= Rolex Tower =

Skyscraper in Dubai

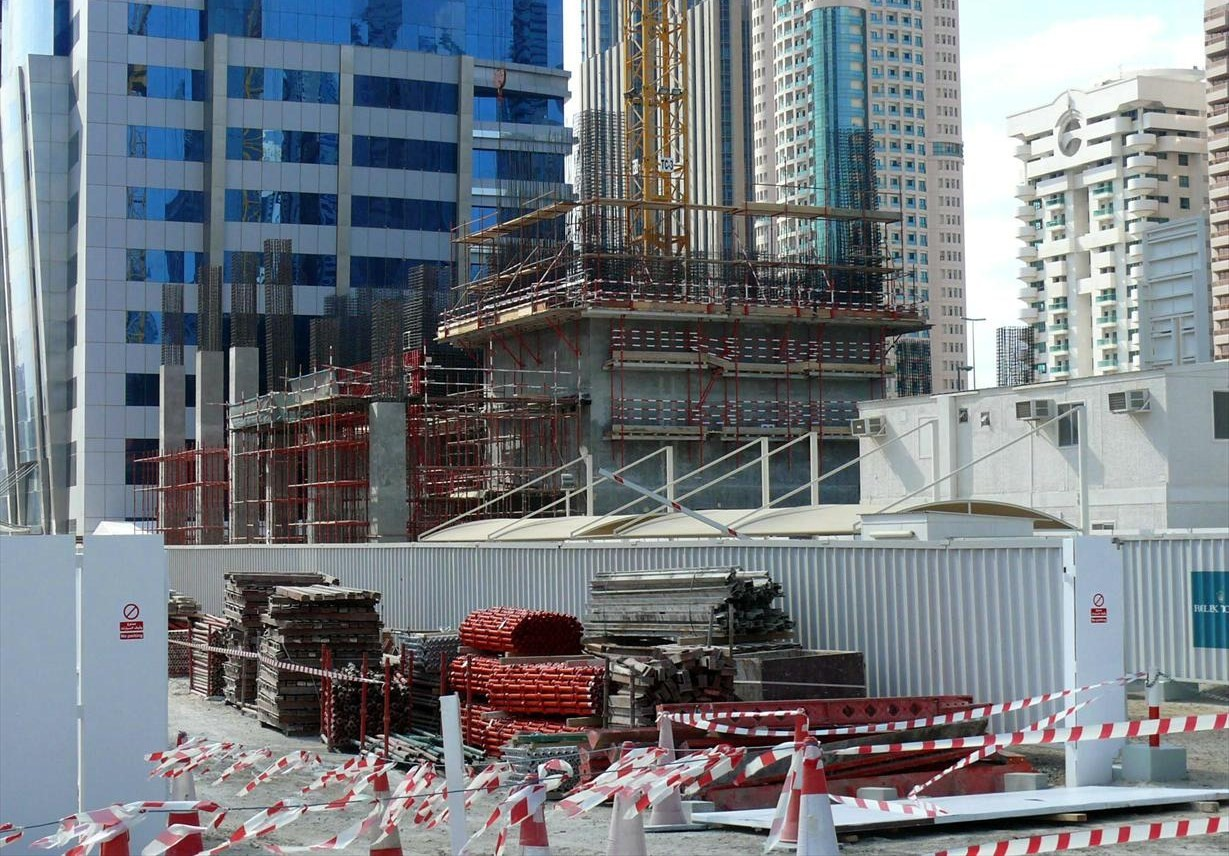
- Rolex Tower under construction on 28 December 2007
- Interactive map of the Rolex Tower area

General information
- Location: Dubai, United Arab Emirates, Sheikh Zayed Road
- Coordinates: 25°12′35.11″N 55°16′31.55″E
- Construction started: 2007
- Completed: 2010

Technical details
- Floor count: 59

Design and construction
- Architect: Skidmore, Owings & Merrill
- Structural engineer: Skidmore, Owings & Merrill

The Rolex Tower is a 59-floor tower in Dubai, United Arab Emirates. The tower has a total structural height of 235 m (771 ft). Construction of the Rolex Tower was completed in 2010; the tower's inauguration was 7 November 2010. The building encompasses both residential and commercial space and is owned by Ahmed Seddiqi and Sons.

It is the authorized distributor of Swiss Rolex watches in the UAE.

== Design ==
The architectural design of the tower is a combination of simplicity and elegance, and is distinguished by its glass façade that glows like a bright lantern after sunrise, as it stands out with its turquoise color and is opaque on the lower floors, but turns semi-transparent at the top.

== See also ==
- List of tallest buildings in Dubai
- List of tallest buildings in the United Arab Emirates
