= 7 World Trade Center =

Office building in Manhattan, New York

- 7 World Trade Center from 3 World Trade Center, in 2022

General information
- Status: Completed
- Type: Office
- Location: 250 Greenwich Street; Manhattan, New York City 10006, United States
- Coordinates: 40.7133°N 74.0120°W
- Construction started: May 7, 2002
- Completed: 2006
- Opened: May 23, 2006

Height
- Architectural: 743 ft (226 m)
- Roof: 741 ft (226 m)
- Top floor: 679 ft (207 m)

Technical details
- Floor count: 52
- Floor area: 1,681,118 sq ft (156,181 m^{2})
- Lifts/elevators: 29

Design and construction
- Architect: David Childs of SOM
- Developer: Silverstein Properties
- Engineer: Jaros, Baum & Bolles (MEP)
- Structural engineer: WSP Cantor Seinuk
- Main contractor: Tishman Construction

Website
- 7 World Trade Center, wtc.com

7 World Trade Center (7 WTC, WTC-7, or Tower 7) is an office building constructed as part of the new World Trade Center in Lower Manhattan, New York City. The tower is located on a city block bounded by Greenwich, Vesey, Washington, and Barclay Streets on the east, south, west, and north, respectively. 7 World Trade Center was developed by Larry Silverstein, who holds a ground lease for the site from the Port Authority of New York and New Jersey, and designed by Skidmore, Owings & Merrill.

The building was constructed to replace the original structure on the site, part of the original World Trade Center. The previous structure, completed in 1987, was destroyed in the September 11 attacks in 2001. Construction of the new 7 World Trade Center began in 2002 and was completed on May 23, 2006. The building is 52 stories tall (plus one underground floor), making it the 64th-tallest in New York. It is built on a smaller footprint than the original; a small park across Greenwich Street occupies space that was part of the original building's footprint.

The current building's design emphasizes safety, with a reinforced concrete core, wider stairways, and thicker fireproofing on steel columns. It also incorporates numerous green design features. The building received the U.S. Green Building Council's Leadership in Energy and Environmental Design (LEED) Gold certification and was part of the council's pilot program for Leadership in Energy and Environmental Design – Core and Shell Development (LEED-CS).

== History ==
The original 7 World Trade Center was a 47-story skyscraper with a red granite facade. It opened in 1987 as part of the original World Trade Center building complex. The September 11, 2001, terrorist attacks caused the collapse of the World Trade Center; falling debris from the collapsing 110-story Twin Towers destroyed or severely damaged nearby buildings, including 7 World Trade Center, which collapsed about seven hours later.

Preliminary site plans for the World Trade Center rebuild

=== Construction ===
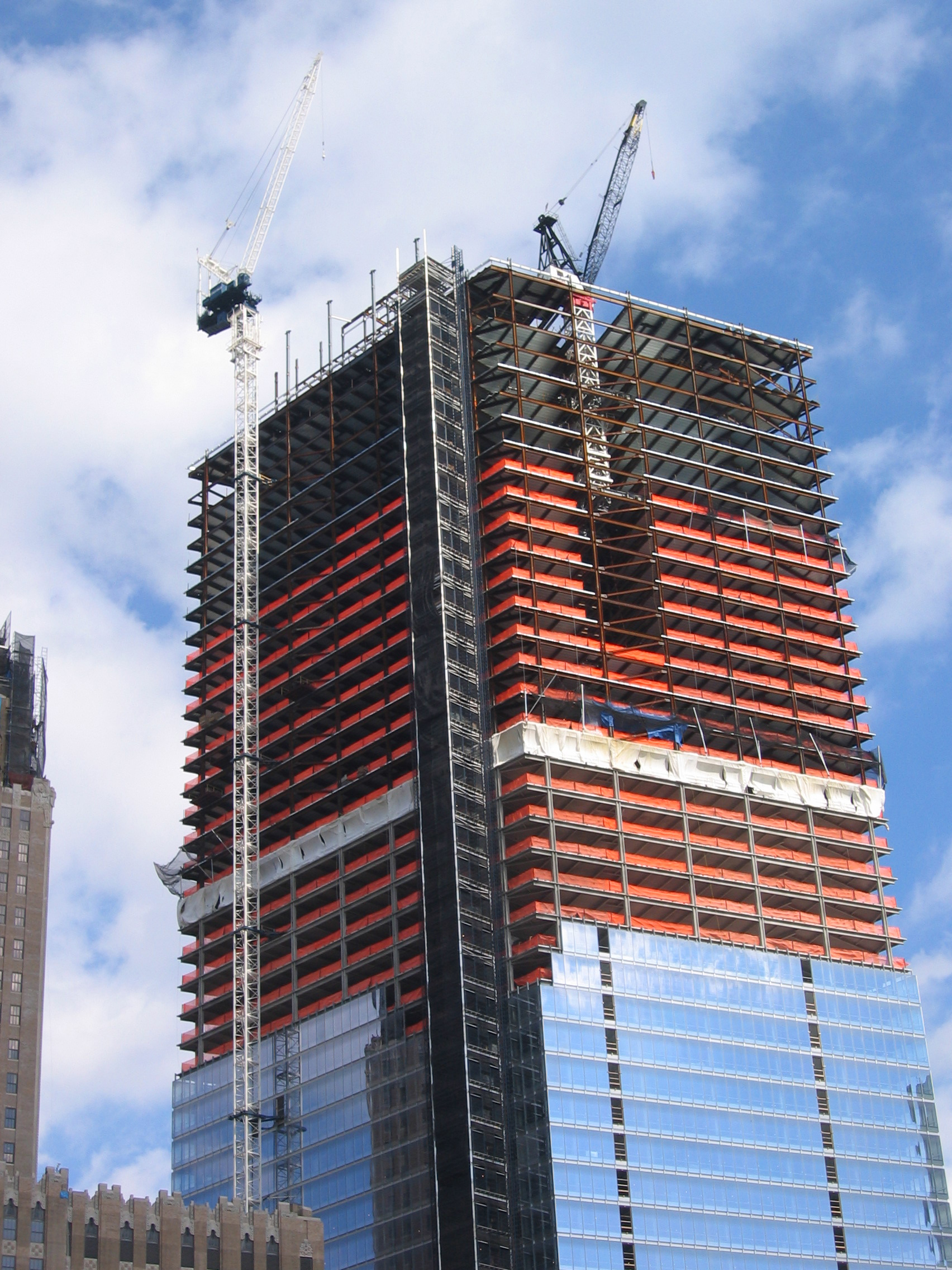
7 World Trade Center construction in October 2004

The construction phase of the new 7 World Trade Center began on May 7, 2002, with the installation of a fence around the construction site. Restoring the Consolidated Edison substation was an urgent priority to meet power demands of Lower Manhattan; the utility stated that it needed to replace four of the ten destroyed transformers by 2003. Because 7 World Trade Center is separate from the main 16-acre (6.5 ha) World Trade Center site, Larry Silverstein required approval only from the landowner, the Port Authority, before he could rebuild the tower. Construction of the power substation was completed in October 2003, and the substation went into service in May 2004.

Work next proceeded on the office tower itself. An unusual approach was used in constructing the building; erecting the steel frame before adding the concrete core. This approach allowed the construction schedule to be shortened by a few months. By July 2005, American Express Financial Advisors was planning to lease 20,000 square feet (1,900 m^{2}) of space, making it the building's first tenant. Although Silverstein intended for the building's design to attract tenants, he wanted occupants to pay $50/ft^{2} ($540/m^{2}) to lease space by 2005, which New York magazine called "easily the highest price in lower Manhattan".

Construction was completed in 2006 at a cost of $700 million. Though Silverstein received $861 million from insurance on the old building, he owed more than $400 million on its mortgage. Costs to rebuild were covered by $475 million in Liberty Bonds, which provide tax-exempt financing to help stimulate rebuilding in Lower Manhattan and insurance money that remained after other expenses.

A 15,000 sq ft (1,400 m^{2}) triangular park was created between the extended Greenwich Street and West Broadway by David Childs with Ken Smith and his colleague, Annie Weinmayr, of Ken Smith Landscape Architect. The park comprises an open central plaza with a fountain and flanking groves of sweetgum trees and boxwood shrubs. At the center of the fountain, sculptor Jeff Koons created a 9-foot-tall (2.7 m) stainless steel sculpture called Balloon Flower (Red).

=== Completion and early years ===
The building was officially opened on May 23, 2006. The opening was marked by a free concert featuring Suzanne Vega, Citizen Cope, Bill Ware Vibes, Brazilian Girls, Ollabelle, Pharaoh's Daughter, Ronan Tynan (of the Irish Tenors), and special guest Lou Reed. Prior to its opening, in March 2006, the new building was used as a filming location for the movie Perfect Stranger.

The building was 10 percent leased by August 2006. Several of the unoccupied upper floors were used for events such as charity lunches, fashion shows, and black-tie galas. Silverstein Properties allowed space in the new building to be used for these events as a means to draw people to see the building. From September 8 to October 7, 2006, the work of photographer Jonathan Hyman was displayed in "An American Landscape", a free exhibit hosted by the World Trade Center Memorial Foundation, on the 45th floor of 7 World Trade Center. The exhibit consisted of 63 photographs that captured Americans' responses after the September 11 attacks.

In September 2006, Moody's signed a 20-year lease for 15 floors at 7 World Trade Center; prior to Moody's lease, only eight floors had been occupied. Other tenants that had signed leases in 7 World Trade Center in its first two years included ABN AMRO, Ameriprise Financial Inc., DRW Trading Group, publisher Mansueto Ventures, and the New York Academy of Sciences. Silverstein Properties also had offices and the Silver Suites executive office suites at 7 World Trade Center. Architectural and engineering firms working on 1 World Trade Center, 150 Greenwich Street, 175 Greenwich Street, and 200 Greenwich Street also set up offices in the building. Two-thirds of the building's office space had been leased by April 2007. After ABN AMRO was acquired by the Royal Bank of Scotland, forex services provider FXDD subleased some of the Royal Bank of Scotland's space in 2009.

=== 2010s to present ===
The law firm WilmerHale signed 200,000 square feet (19,000 m^{2}) at the building in April 2011. The building became fully leased that September after MSCI agreed to occupy 125,000 square feet (11,600 m^{2}) on the top floor; other tenants at the time included FXDD, WilmerHale, and the bank WestLB. Following this, Silverstein announced in 2012 that he would refinance the building with a $452.8 million Liberty bond issue and a $125 million commercial mortgage-backed security loan. At the time, the building was valued at $940 million, in large part because it was fully occupied. FXDD subleased its space to engineering company Permasteelisa in 2015 and artificial intelligence firm IPsoft in 2016. The building was 94.8 percent occupied by 2017. By then, roughly three-quarters of the space was occupied by four tenants, including Moody's, the Royal Bank of Scotland, and WilmerHale.

Wedding planning company Zola and the building's own architecture firm Skidmore, Owings & Merrill both leased space at 7 WTC in early 2019. This was followed in July 2019 by luxury drink brand Moët Hennessy and media company AccuWeather. After Mansueto Ventures and three other firms leased space at 7 WTC in April 2022, the building was 97 percent occupied. Shortly afterward, Silverstein Properties refinanced the property with a $458 million loan from Goldman Sachs.

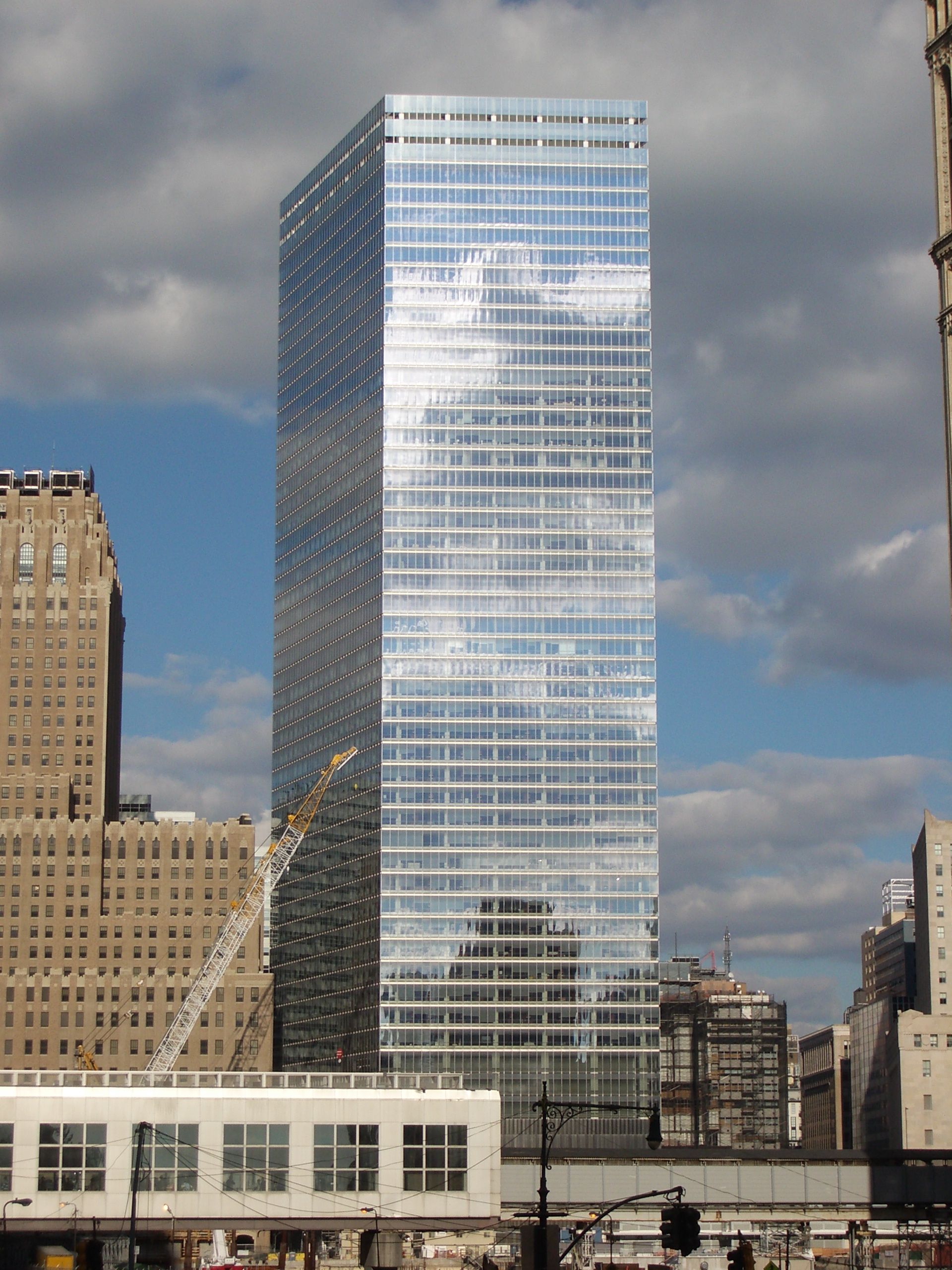
7 World Trade Center looking from the southwest in 2008.

== Architecture ==
The new 7 World Trade Center has 52 stories and is 741 ft (226 m) tall. The building has 42 floors of leasable space, starting at the 11th floor, and a total of 1.7 million sq ft (160,000 m^{2}) of office space. The first ten floors house an electrical substation which provides power to much of Lower Manhattan. The office tower has a narrower footprint at ground level than did its predecessor, so the course of Greenwich Street could be restored to reunite TriBeCa and the Financial District. The original building, on the other hand, had bordered West Broadway on the east, necessitating the destruction of Greenwich Street between Barclay Street and the northern border of the World Trade Center superblock.

=== Facade ===
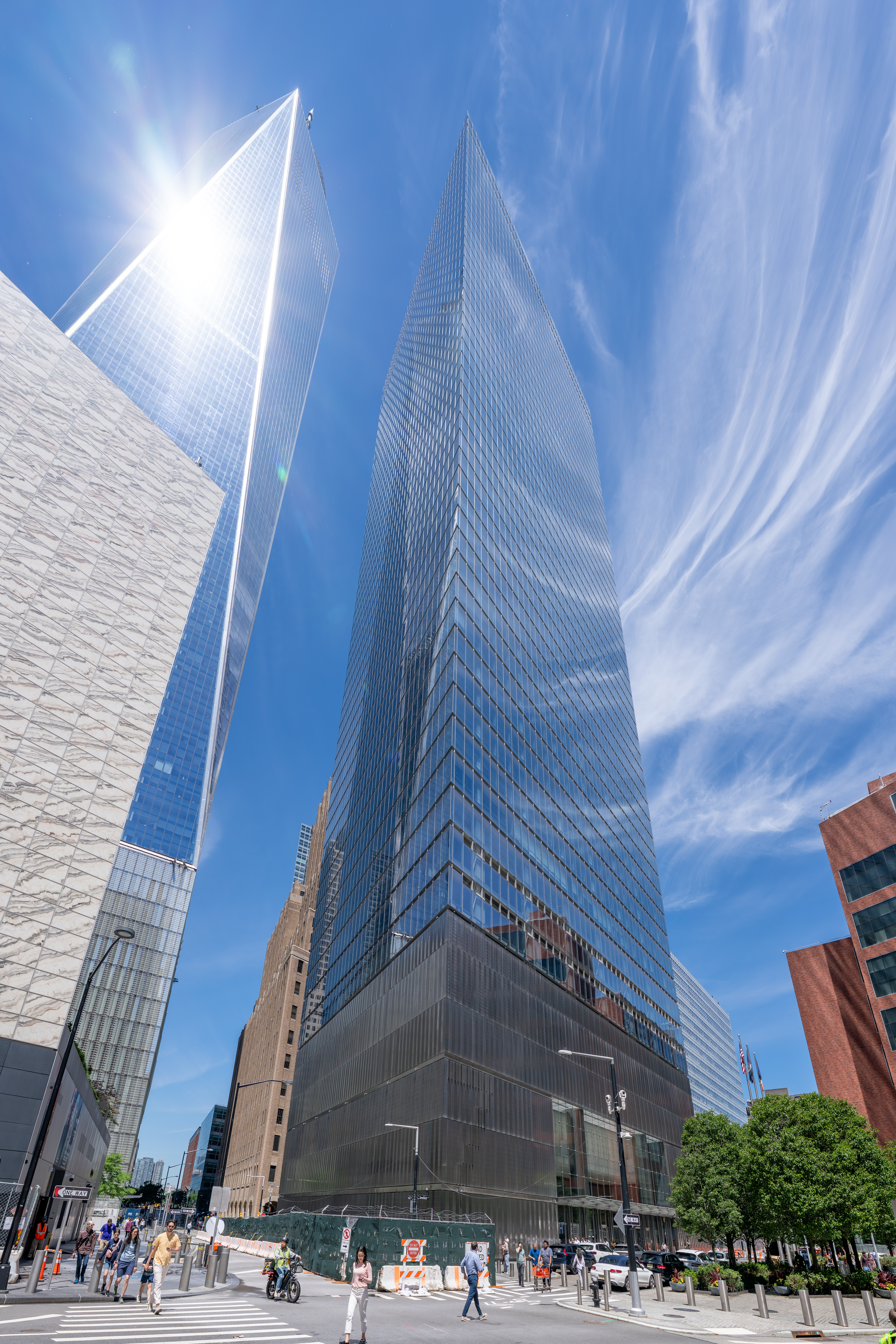
The new 7 World Trade Center from the ground

David Childs of Skidmore, Owings and Merrill worked in conjunction with glass artist and designer James Carpenter to create a design that uses ultra-clear, low-iron glass to provide reflectivity and light. There are stainless-steel spandrels behind the glass to help reflect sunlight. The spandrels are textured and are curved in a manner that reflects light both from each story's window sills and from the sky. On the lower stories, there are 15-by-5-foot (4.6 by 1.5 m) panels with steel triangular prisms. There are 130,000 prisms in total, which are tilted at different angles to reflect natural light from the sky. The window panes on the upper floors are 13.6 feet (4.1 m) high and are made of white glass with low concentrations of iron. Stainless steel used in the facade is molybdenum-containing Type 316, which provides improved resistance to corrosion.

The new 7 World Trade Center was built above the Con Edison substation. When the current building was constructed, the transformer vaults were rearranged into an 80-foot-tall (24 m) shell at the building's base. To enclose the power substation and improve its aesthetics, the base of the building has a curtain wall with stainless steel louvers that provide ventilation for the machinery. The transformers each weigh 168 short tons (150 long tons; 152 t) and are 20 feet (6.1 m) tall. There are also radiators with vertical cooling blades facing the street, which in turn cool down the transformers.

There is a cable-net glass wall on the eastern elevation of the facade, just above the Greenwich Street entrance. This cable-net wall measures 50 by 110 feet (15 by 34 m) across. During the day, the curtain wall reflects light, while at night it is illuminated by blue and white LED lights. The curtain wall has 220,000 LEDs; at night, the prisms on the facade reflect light from each LED onto the street. The curtain wall around the lobby uses heavily laminated, heat-strengthened glass that meets high standards for blast resistance. At night, a large cube of light above the lobby also emanates blue light, while during the day it provides white light to the lobby, and at dusk, it transitions to violet and back to blue.

=== Features ===
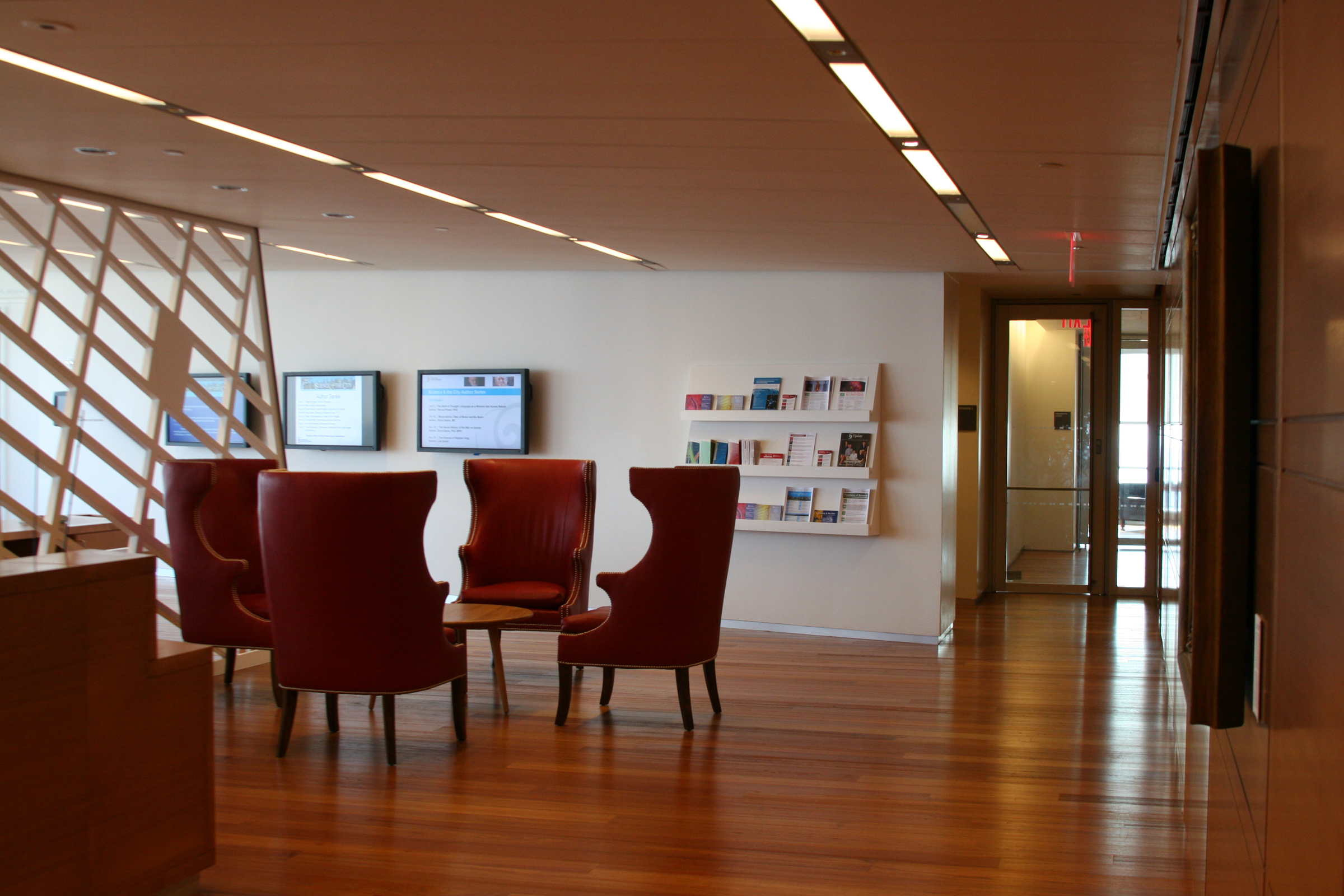
New York Academy of Sciences office space on the 40th floor

Inside the main lobby, artist Jenny Holzer created an LED installation with glowing text moving across wide plastic panels. The wall measures 65 ft (20 m) wide and 14 ft (4.3 m) tall. Holzer worked with Klara Silverstein, the wife of Larry Silverstein, to select poetry for the art installation. The wall of the lobby is structurally fortified as a security measure. On the upper stories, some tenants customized the design of their spaces. The space occupied by Mansueto Ventures was designed to maximize natural light exposure and has an open floor plan. The 40th-floor space used by the New York Academy of Sciences was designed by H3 Hardy Collaboration Architecture and includes a reception lobby with an openwork screen; a 296-seat event room; and a horizontal 72-foot-long (22 m) mural.

7 World Trade Center is equipped with Otis destination elevators to reduce dwell times and travel times. After pressing their destination floor number on a keypad in the lobby, passengers are directed to specific elevators that will stop at the selected floor; the elevator cabs do not contain buttons. The elevator system is integrated with the lobby key-card system, which can identify the floor on which an employee works, then automatically call an elevator for that floor.

WSP Cantor Seinuk served as structural engineer on the project, while Jaros, Baum & Bolles was the MEP engineer. Nearly 30 percent of structural steel used in the building consists of recycled steel. Rainwater is collected and used for irrigation of the park and to cool the building. Along with other sustainable design features, the building is designed to allow in plenty of natural light, power is metered to tenants to encourage them to conserve energy, the heating steam is reused to generate some power for the building, and recycled materials are used for insulation and interior materials.

The building was promoted as one of the safest skyscrapers in the U.S. upon its completion According to Silverstein Properties, it "incorporate[s] a host of life-safety enhancements that will become the prototype for new high-rise construction." The building has 2-foot-thick (0.61 m) reinforced-concrete and fireproofed elevator and stairway access shafts. The original building used only drywall to line these shafts. The stairways are wider than in the original building to permit faster egress.

== See also ==
- List of tallest buildings in New York City
- World Trade Center in popular culture
