= Cayan Tower =

High-rise building in Dubai, United Arab Emirates

- Cayan Tower in November 2014

- Location within United Arab Emirates

General information
- Status: Completed
- Type: Residential
- Location: Dubai, United Arab Emirates
- Coordinates: 25°05′12.80″N 55°08′42.89″E
- Construction started: 19 August 2006
- Completed: 10 June 2013

Height
- Tip: 306.4 m (1,005 ft)

Technical details
- Floor count: 73 (5 below ground)
- Lifts/elevators: 7

Design and construction
- Architect: Skidmore, Owings and Merrill
- Developer: Cayan Real Estate Investment & Development
- Structural engineer: Skidmore, Owings and Merrill
- Main contractor: Arabtec

Cayan Tower, known as Infinity Tower before it was inaugurated, is a 306-metre-tall (1,004 ft), 75-story skyscraper in Dubai, United Arab Emirates. The tower is designed by Skidmore, Owings and Merrill SOM architectural group for Cayan Real Estate Investment and Development. Upon its opening on 10 June 2013, the tower became the world's tallest high-rise building with a twist of 90 degrees. This record has since been surpassed by the Shanghai Tower, which opened in February 2015.

== Design ==
The twisting design of Cayan Tower was achieved by rotating each floor 1.2 degrees around a cylindrical elevator and service core. Prior to its name change to Cayan, the tower carried various names to describe its original shape. The unique design was supported by a dynamic analysis that studied the potential performance of the tower under wind, seismic, and other dynamic loads. Cayan Tower's apartments are designed with reconstituted wooden floors, Chinese synthetic marble counter tops, and kitchen fixtures. The tower also includes a five-story parking garage behind it. The rooms of the tower are designed in such a way that it would not be affected by direct sunlight due to titanium-coloured metal panels on cast-in-place concrete columns aided with repetitive staggered screen panels to stop penetrating sunlight from disturbing the residents of the unit.

== Site flooding ==
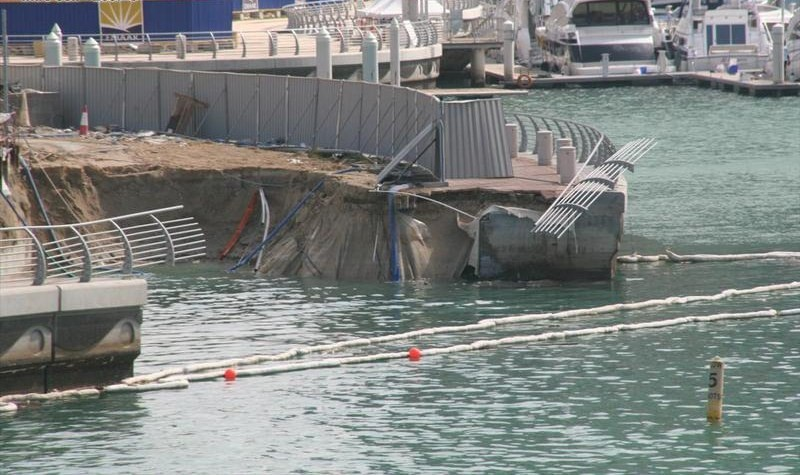
On 8 February 2007, the plot was flooded the day before due to the collapse of the wall separating the plot and the water in Dubai Marina.

The tower's construction was on hold for a year and a half after the foundation site of the tower was flooded when the wall that held back the Dubai Marina was breached on 7 February 2007. Witnesses described a loud cracking sound, followed by an inflow of sand and water. The project resumed construction in July 2008.

== Official launch ceremony ==
The Cayan Tower was inaugurated with fireworks accompanied with laser light display on the tower on 10 June 2013 and become the world's tallest twisted tower, surpassing Turning Torso. The tower was renamed Cayan Tower, with the developer saying,

there [ is ] more than one tower with the name Infinity and we wanted something different [ . . . ] We are very attached with this unique project and it was a very conscious decision we took. We know there won’t be any Cayan Tower in the world and this will be the only one.

== Gallery ==
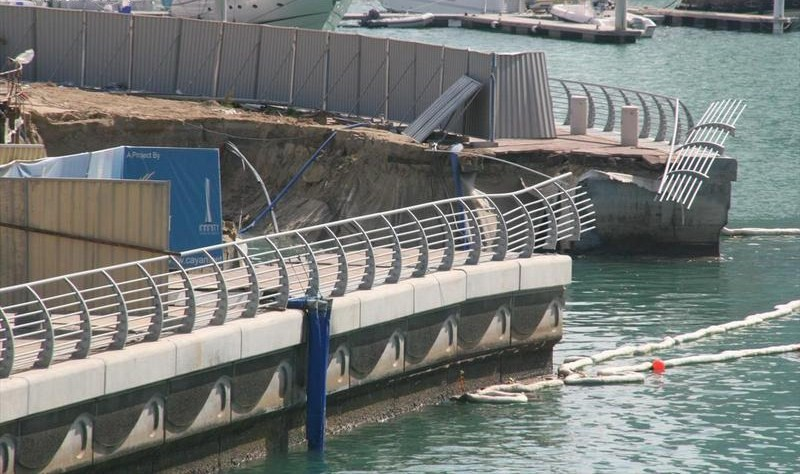
Collapsed wall and flooding at the Infinity Tower construction site

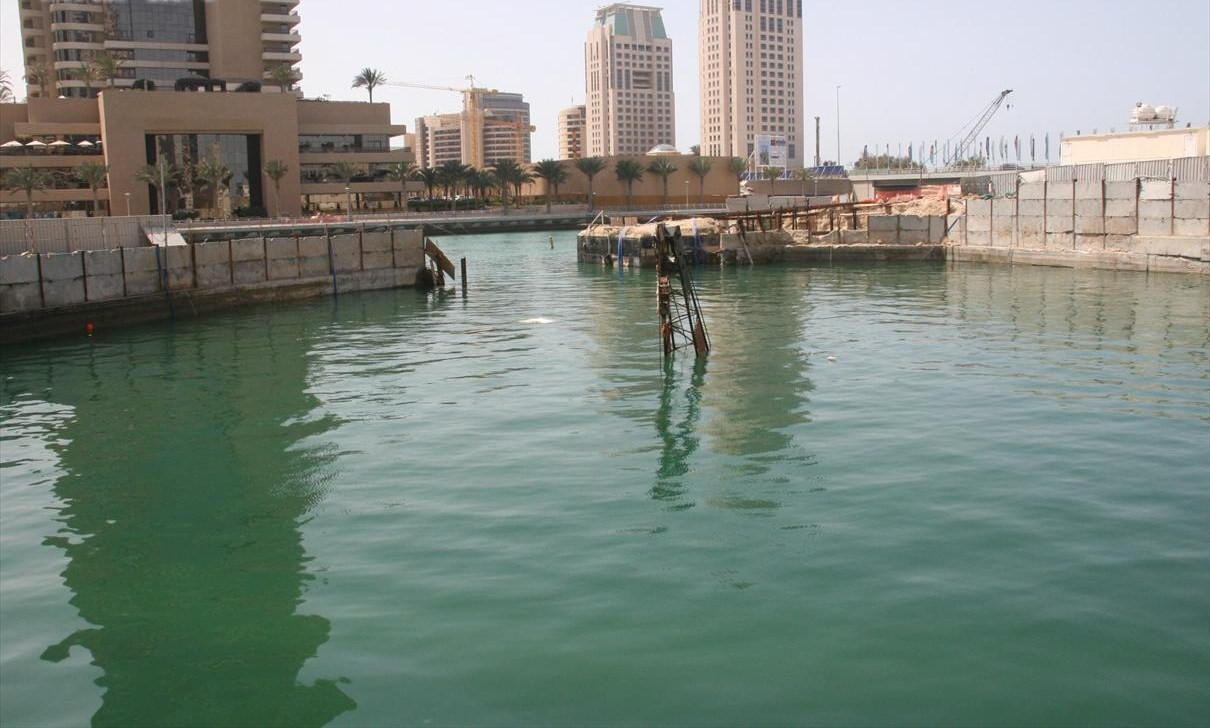
Infinity Tower's flooding on 9 March 2007

== See also ==
- Ocean Heights (Dubai)
- Damac Heights
- Al Hamra Tower
- List of tallest buildings in Dubai
- List of tallest residential buildings in the world
- List of tallest buildings in the United Arab Emirates
- List of twisted buildings
