= CetraRuddy =

American architecture and interior design firm

CetraRuddy Architecture

Practice information
- Partners: John Cetra, Nancy J. Ruddy, Eugene Flotteron
- Founded: 1987
- Location: New York City, New York

Significant works and honors
- Buildings: One Madison, Walker Tower, Lincoln Square Synagogue

Website
- www.cetraruddy.com

CetraRuddy Architecture is a New York City-based architecture and interior design firm, who has worked on projects in the United States, especially New York City; Europe; and the Middle East. It provides architectural and interior design services for residences, hotels, schools, and cultural institutions. The firm was founded in 1987 by John Cetra and Nancy J. Ruddy and is led by four principals and three associate principals with a staff of over 100 architects and interior designers.

== Projects ==
CetraRuddy designed One Madison, a 50-story "sliver building" condominium tower on East 23rd Street at Madison Avenue, south of Madison Square Park. In 2014, the building received the Architizer A+ Jury Award for Residential High Rise, and since 2013, it has been part of the "Sky High & the Logic of Luxury" exhibition at the Skyscraper Museum in New York City.

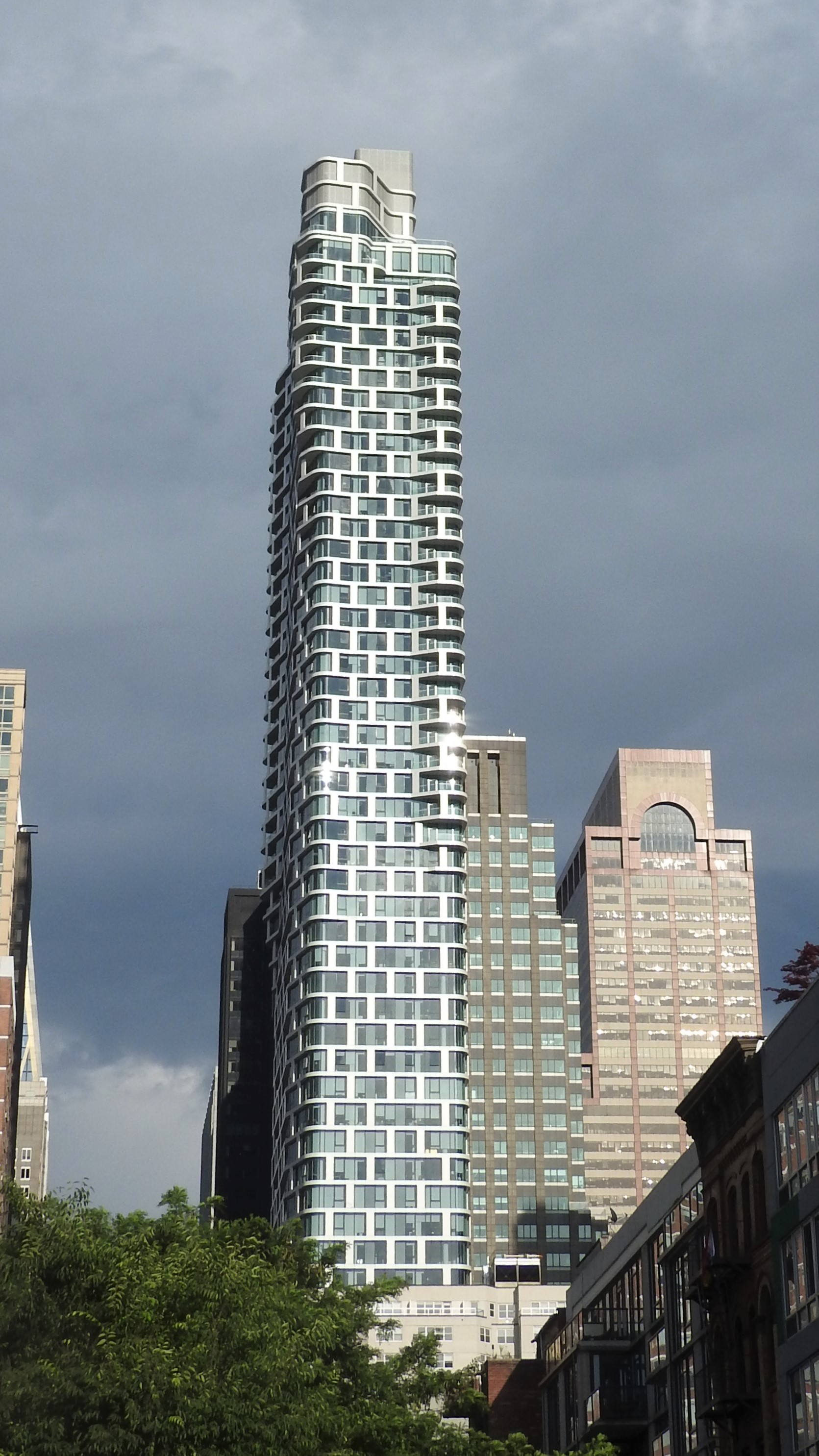
The ARO building

The firm is also responsible for the adaptive reuse of residences of the Walker Tower, a former telephone switch building in Chelsea, Manhattan, and for the new Lincoln Square Synagogue building, which received an Honorable Mention for Religious Institution for Interior Design magazine's 2013 Best of Year Awards.

In 2018 they were featured in the New York Times for their new-construction apartment project ARO, on the site of the late Roseland Ballroom.

CetraRuddy were appointed architects for the conversion from office to residential use of the large 25 Water Street building in New York City starting in 2023, with 1,300 apartments planned.

== Awards ==
John Cetra and Nancy Ruddy were inducted into the Interior Design Hall of Fame.
