= List of sliver buildings =

This is a list of buildings in New York City that are referred to as sliver buildings, tall buildings with street frontage of 45 feet (14 m) or less.

Name / Address	Image	Floors	Frontage (feet)	Year built	Notes and references
14 East 96th St		21	22	1981	
328 East 86th Street		13		1981	Built before the enactment of the sliver law.
985 Park Avenue	Upload image	15	25	2008	
1190 Lexington Avenue		18	34	1983	Foundation completed before the enactment of the sliver law.
386 Columbus Avenue	Upload image	22	25	1985	Foundation completed before the enactment of the sliver law.
177 East 79th Street			22	1980	Built before the enactment of the sliver law.
266 East 78th Street		16		1981	Built before the enactment of the sliver law.
110 East 71st Street		23		1982	Built before the enactment of the sliver law.
344 East 63rd Street	Upload image				Built before the enactment of the sliver law.
160 West 56th Street	Upload image	19		2016	A sliver hotel, opened in 2016
224 East 52nd Street		15	40	1984	Foundation completed before the enactment of the sliver law.
926 Second Avenue		23	25	1982	Built before the enactment of the sliver law.
16 East 46th Street		22		2010	Hotel
5 East 44th Street	Upload image	22		2008	Twenty-two story modern sliver built in 2008
211 Madison Avenue		32	33	1985	Also known as Morgan Court. Foundation completed before the enactment of the sliver law. Shooting location of the 1993 film Sliver.
559 Second Avenue	Upload image	10	39	1983	Foundation completed before the enactment of the sliver law.
382 Third Avenue	Upload image	14	25	1984	Foundation completed before the enactment of the sliver law.
218 East 29th Street	Upload image	10	25	1984	Foundation completed before the enactment of the sliver law.
132 West 26th Street	Upload image	12	19	2021	Originally planned for a 19-story hotel, now a condominium building.
19 Park Place	Upload image	21	25	2016	Originally known as Tribeca Royale, renamed to Iris TriBeCa.
