= ARO (building) =

Residential skyscraper in Manhattan, New York

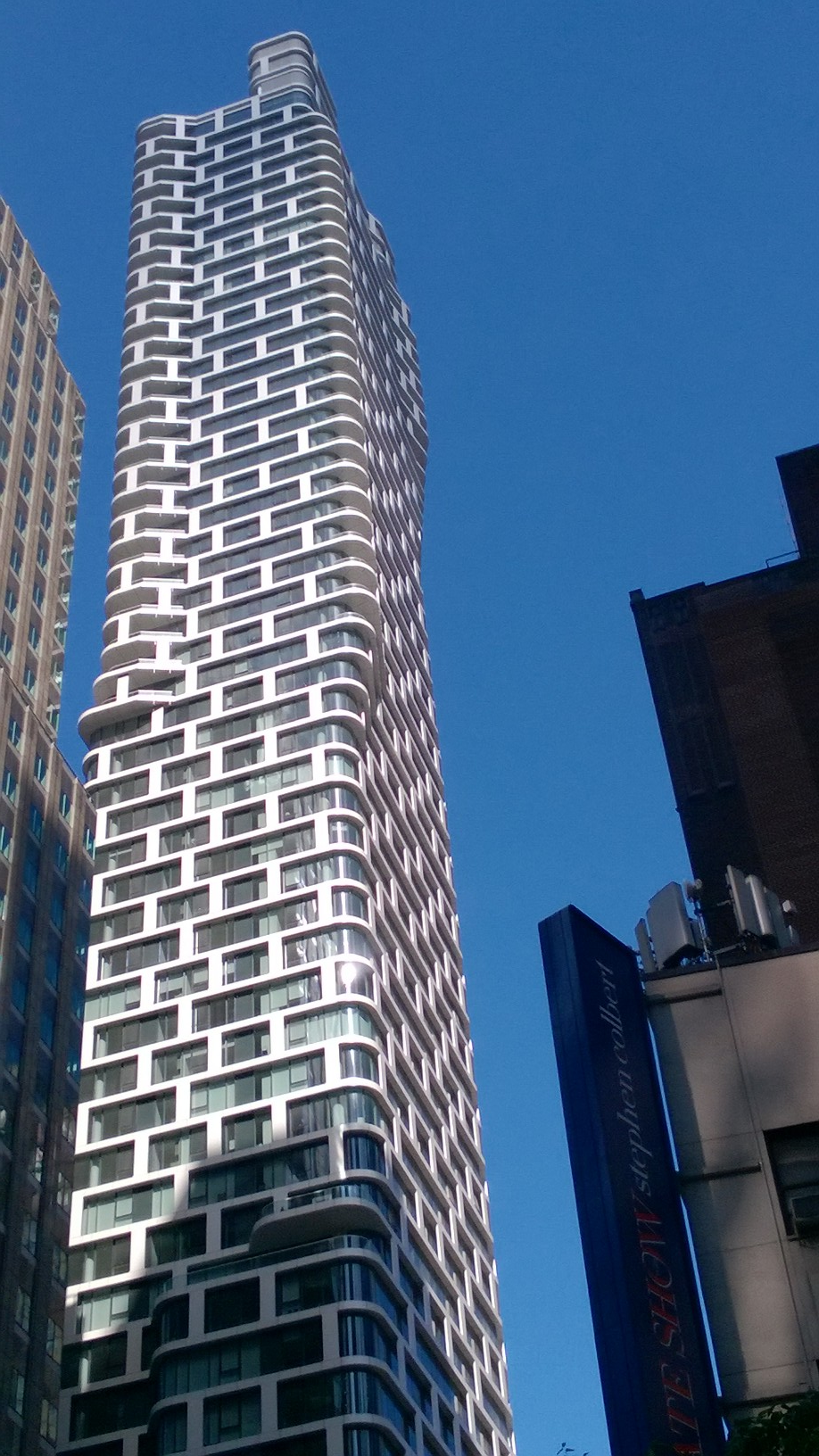
- The building's exterior in 2019
- Interactive map of the ARO area

General information
- Coordinates: 40°45′49″N 73°59′03″W
- Construction started: 2015
- Construction stopped: 2018
- Opened: October 2018

Design and construction
- Architecture firm: CetraRuddy
- Developer: Algin Management

ARO is a rental luxury apartment skyscraper in the Midtown Manhattan neighborhood of New York City, New York. Designed by CetraRuddy, it is located on 242 West 53rd Street, the former site of the Roseland Ballroom. Construction began in 2015 and was completed in 2018; it started leasing in October 2018.

== History ==
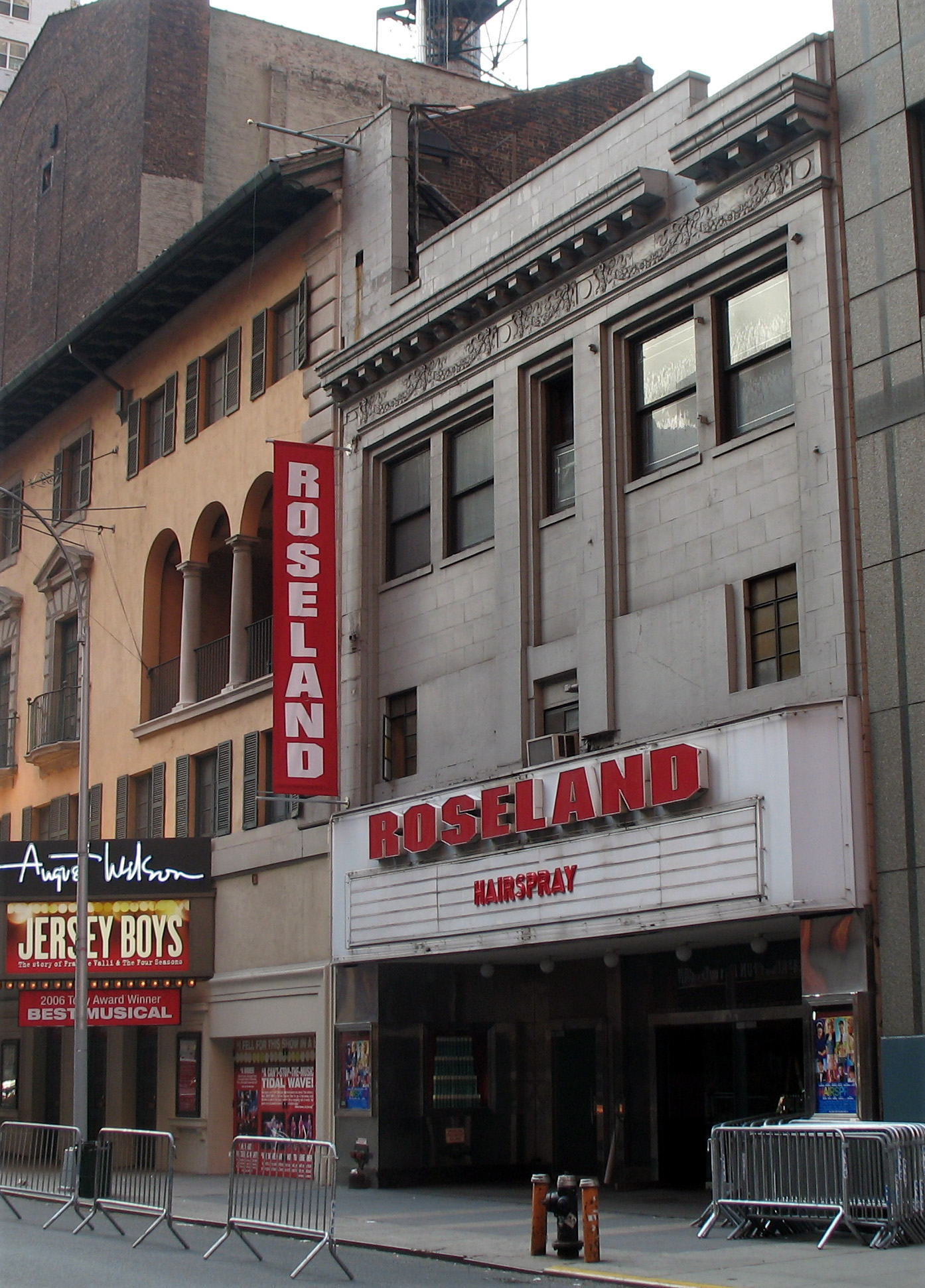
The Roseland Ballroom in 2007

ARO stands at the former site of the Roseland Ballroom. In November 2013, it was announced that the ballroom would be replaced with an approximately 50-story tower designed by CetraRuddy. The first renderings of ARO were published in January 2014, when it was reported that the building would be 59 stories. Modified versions of the renderings were released in July 2017, alongside the "ARO" name. The name combines the first letter of former Roseland owner Albert Ginsberg's name with the first two letters in "Roseland".

The ballroom was razed starting in August 2014, and demolition was completed in 2015. Algin Management began developing ARO later that year. DeSimone Consulting Engineers worked on the building's structural supports. The building's foundation was constructed in the summer of 2016. By November 2016, construction had reached a height of 12 stories. The building topped out in 2017. Triumph Property Group started leasing one- to three-bedroom apartments in the building in October 2018; at the time, rent prices ranged from $2,900 to $17,500 a month.

== Architecture ==
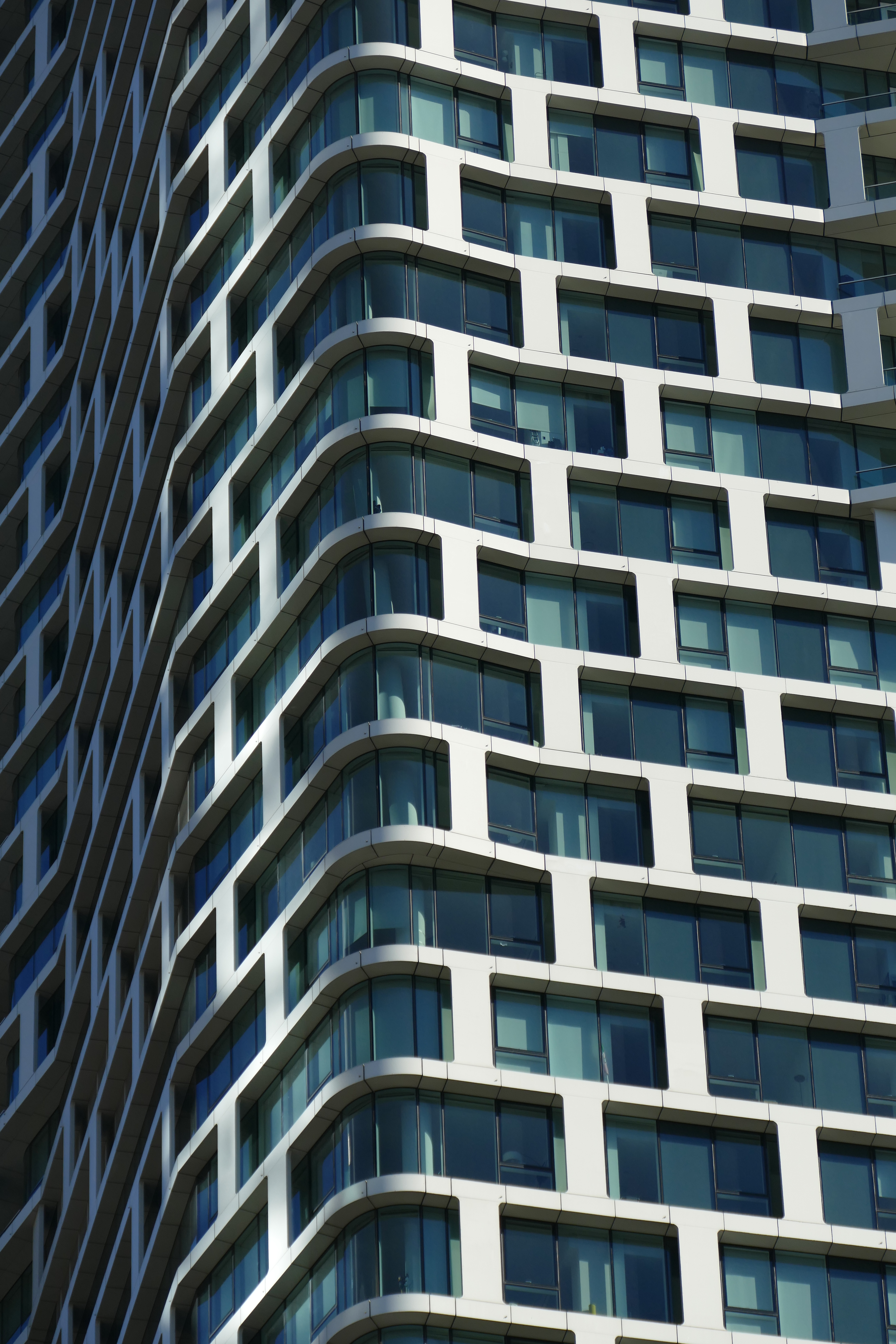
Close-up of ARO's facade in 2025

ARO is a 62-story, 700-foot-tall (210 m) glass tower with a steel lattice exterior. The building's massing, or shape, changes on the upper levels to give each apartment the best lighting and view. To do this, the architects purchased development and air rights from the surrounding low-rise theaters. It has 426 luxury rental apartments, as well as amenities. Retail stores are at ground level, and parking is available underground. Each apartment covers an average of 1,024 square feet (95.1 m^{2}). The apartment models range from one to four bedrooms. Each apartment has a 10-foot-tall (3.0 m) ceiling and floor-to-ceiling windows. It has oak floors, but marble floors in the bathroom. The walls are tiled marble. Some apartments have balconies.

ARO's lobby includes a sculpture, which spells out ARO using letters from the "ROSELAND" sign on the ballroom's 53rd Street side. The sculpture's creator, James Greco, worked as a bartender at the ballroom. Various items related to the ballroom, including concert posters, decorate the lobby. The ARO Club is one of the building's amenity spaces, and is made up of three lounges, which include many sporting and athletic facilities; these are located next to ARO's fitness center. Another amenity space is the ARO Sky Club at the top of the building, which includes a residential rooftop lounge with a glass ceiling.

== Reception ==
The building won numerous architectural prizes, such as the 2015 SARA National Award, the 2017 American Architecture Prize, the 2017 Architecture Podium International Award, and a 2018 Architecture, Construction & Design Award.
