= Highcliff =

Skyscraper in Hong Kong

- 曉盧
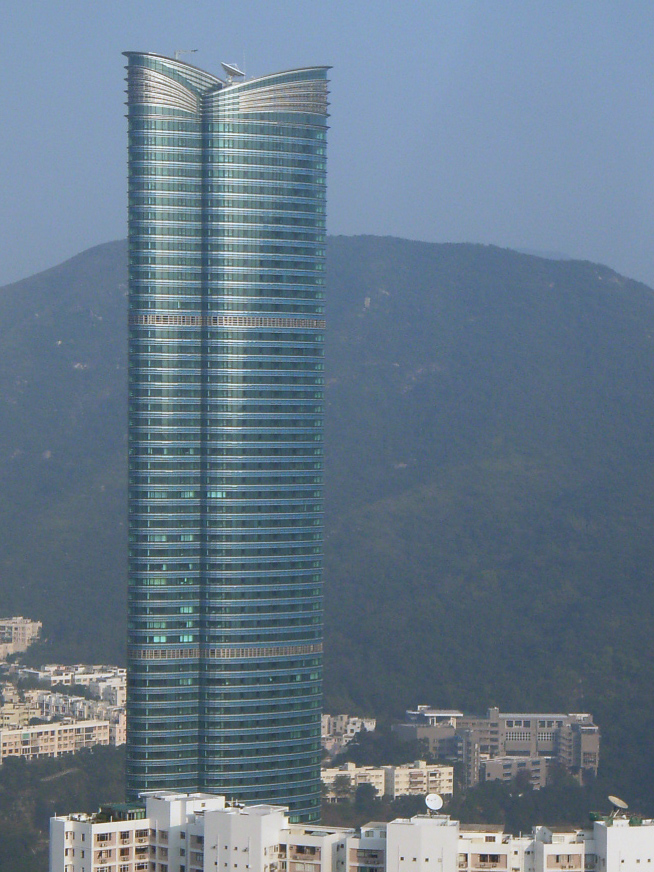
- Highcliff on 13 January 2007
- Interactive map of the Highcliff area

General information
- Type: Residential, parking garage
- Location: Happy Valley, Hong Kong
- Coordinates: 22°15′54″N 114°11′3″E
- Construction started: 2000
- Completed: 2003

Height
- Roof: 252.4 m (828.1 ft)
- Top floor: 241.8 m (793.3 ft)

Technical details
- Floor count: 73
- Floor area: 375,994 sq ft (34,931.0 m^{2})

Design and construction
- Architects: Dennis Lau & Ng Chun Man Architects & Engineers (HK) Ltd.
- Structural engineer: Magnusson Klemencic Associates

Highcliff
- Traditional Chinese: 曉廬
Transcriptions
Yue: Cantonese
- Yale Romanization: Híu lòuh
- Jyutping: Hiu2 lou4

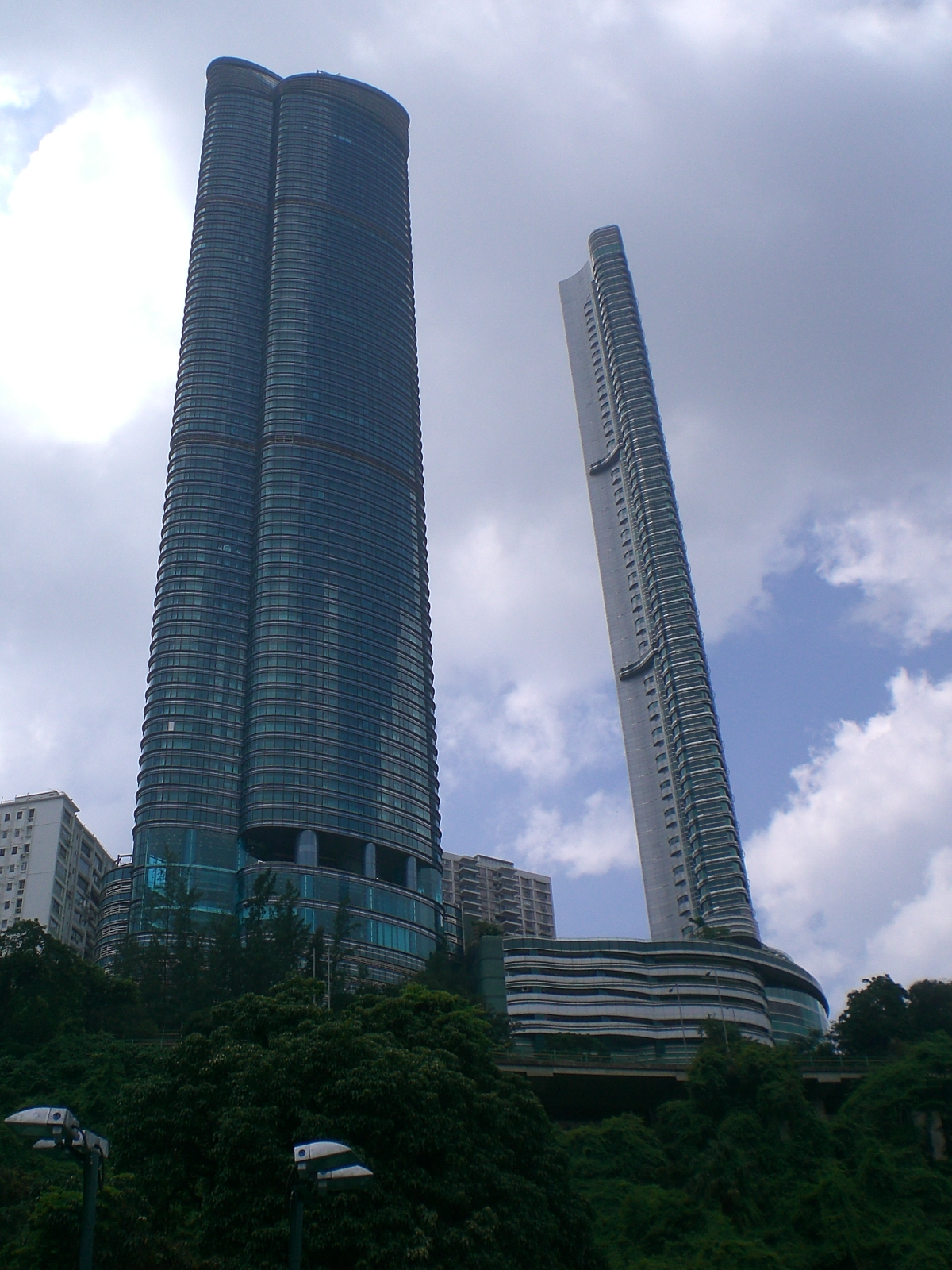
Highcliff (left) and The Summit (right)

Highcliff is a luxury apartment building on a south slope of Happy Valley on Hong Kong Island in Hong Kong. The 75-storey building's construction (70 floors of which are liveable space) began in 2000 and was completed in 2003 under a design by DLN Architects & Engineers. It was the Silver Winner of the 2003 Emporis Skyscraper Award, coming in second to 30 St Mary Axe in London. The tower is the tallest "all"-residential building in Hong Kong island.

Highcliff is thin for such a tall building; it has a slenderness ratio of 1:20 thus being one of the thinnest buildings in the world. Therefore, a passive wind damper was fitted to the top, the first of its kind for a residential building. This was installed because typhoons approach Hong Kong most late summers.

Because of the obvious similarity with a nearby similar building The Summit, the two have been informally called "The Chopsticks". These two buildings highlight the characters of pencil-thin towers that are highly concentrated in Hong Kong.

== See also ==
- The Summit
- List of tallest buildings in Hong Kong

Preceded by Post Tower (Bonn, Germany)	Emporis Skyscraper Award (Silver); 2003	Succeeded by Torre Agbar (Barcelona, Spain)
