= Sliver building =

Type of slender building built on narrow frontage lots

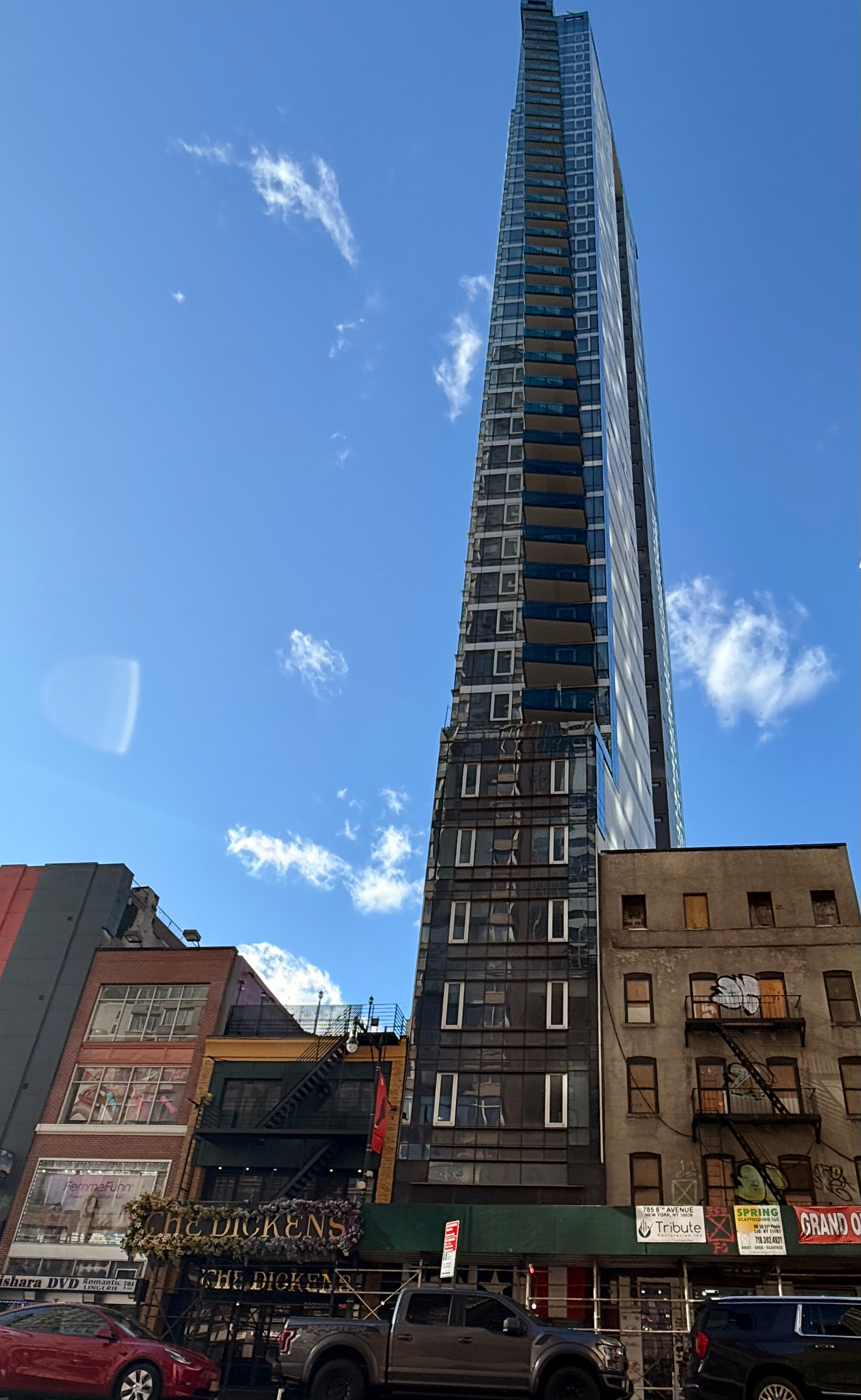
A tall sliver building compared to other narrow frontage buildings

A sliver building is a tall building constructed on a lot with a narrow frontage, more specifically in New York City, 45 feet (14 m) or less that is taller than neighboring buildings. Since the mid-1980s, one major advance in tall building design has been the increase in slenderness ratios, allowing buildings on narrow lots to be built taller.

== History ==
In the early 1980s, there was a high demand in luxury housing market in New York City, but there was a lack of available large lot sizes in high density residential zoning districts. This led to towers on small lots, four to five times taller than nearby townhouses. At the time, there were height limits were set by the floor‑area ratio (FAR) under the 1961 Zoning Resolution. However, the resolution also allowed transferable development rights for developers to buy adjacent buildings' air rights—unused FAR available at each building site—to consolidate into a higher FAR in one tall tower. This allowed developers to build much taller buildings than their neighboring buildings.

In 1983, residents in those districts voiced their concerns on a proliferation of tall buildings on narrow lots towering over neighboring buildings. A few developments including a 19-story building on a lot of 40-foot (12 m) frontage and a 32-story building with 18-foot (5.5 m) width were used as examples of buildings that would negatively impact the neighborhoods. They called them as "sliver" buildings. At that time, there were 477 more potential sites for such developments. On March 3, 1983, the New York City Board of Estimate banned sliver buildings from many residential zoning districts.

The "sliver law" limits the heights of buildings on the lots with frontage of 45 feet (14 m) or less not to exceed the width of the streets or 100 feet (30 m) whichever is less with an exception that if the heights of existing adjacent buildings are higher than that limit, the new building can reach the height of the tallest adjacent buildings.

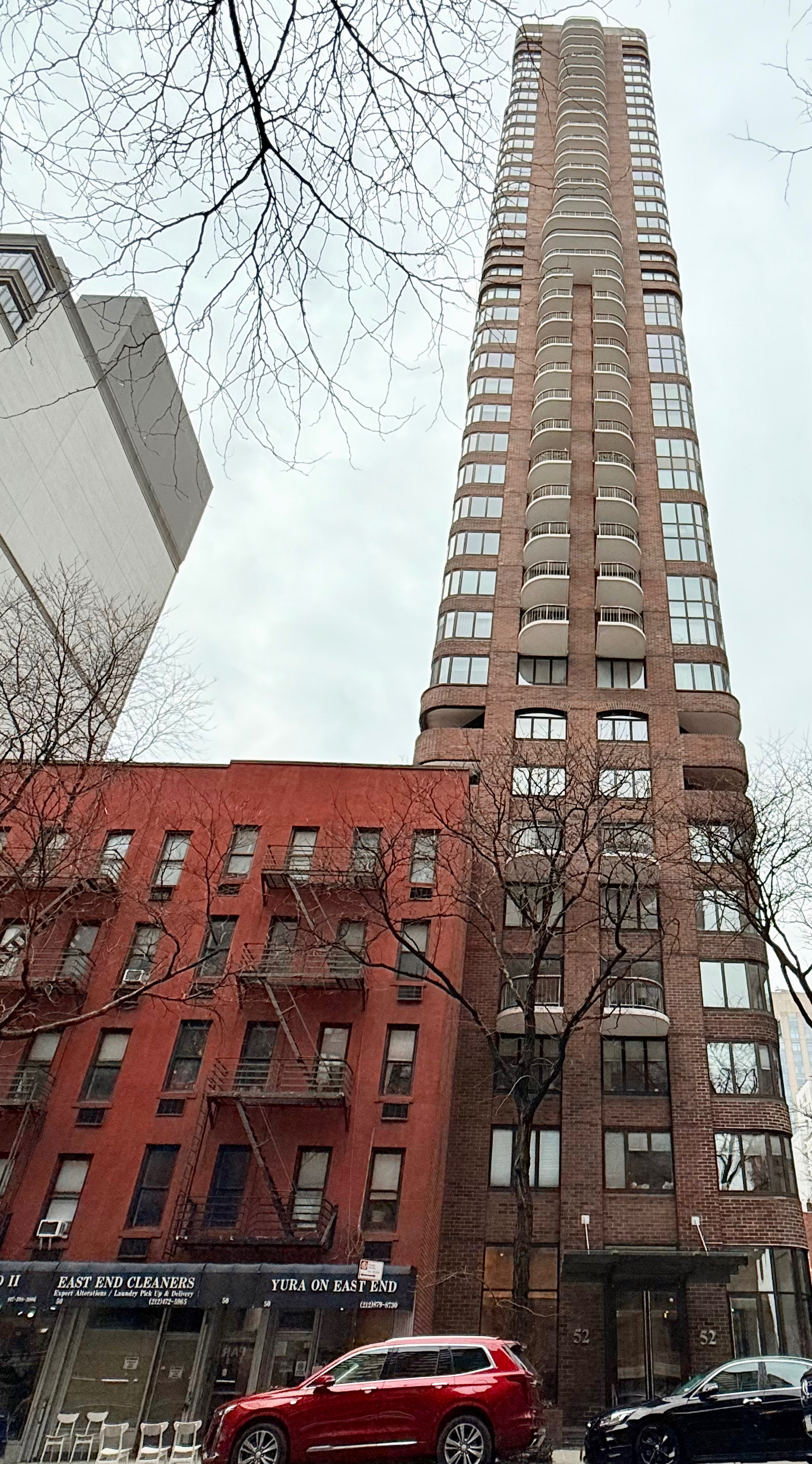
52-54 East End Avenue (right) cantilevered over 50 East End Avenue (left)

After the sliver law was enacted, the city halted sliver building constructions that did not complete the foundation, killing those sliver projects. A few years later, developers started using new designs for sliver buildings with some novel designs. Developers discovered that the definition of the narrow frontage lots of 45 feet (14 m) or less was based on the "lot lines". The lots that had air rights of adjacent buildings transferred would have the new lot lines enlarged to include the air right space. With this discovery, an owner of the 52-54 East End Avenue lot with 36-foot (11 m) frontage bought air rights from an adjacent low-rise building, 50 East End Avenue. The design of the new 40-story tower would have it rise for the first five floors from its narrow base. Then it would cantilevered over the top of the 50 East End Avenue building, and the rest of the tower would be built upward from there. Since the new lot lines of the tower included the cantilevered portion, it resulted in the new lot width of 45 feet 10 inches (13.97 m) which avoided the tower to be subjected to the height limits of the sliver law. The 52-54 East End Avenue tower was also notable in that it achieved the slenderness ratio of 12:1 with its narrow base, becoming one of the most slender buildings at the time of the construction.

The resurgence of the city's real estate market before the 2008 financial crisis led to new sliver buildings being constructed in commercial districts. The new buildings are sometimes cantilevered over adjacent buildings, and built higher than a typical building in the area by adding purchased air rights, sometimes from multiple nearby properties, to the new building's total height. Not long after the 2008 global financial crisis, investors were looking for more stable investments. Luxury real-estate markets in major cities like New York, London and Hong Kong were in high demand. This drove a creation of Billionaires' Row, a new breed of luxury residential towers around Central Park in the 2010s. These supertall towers are wider than the sliver buildings known before them but their heights are much taller, making them very high slenderness ratios, as people call them pencil towers.

== Heights ==
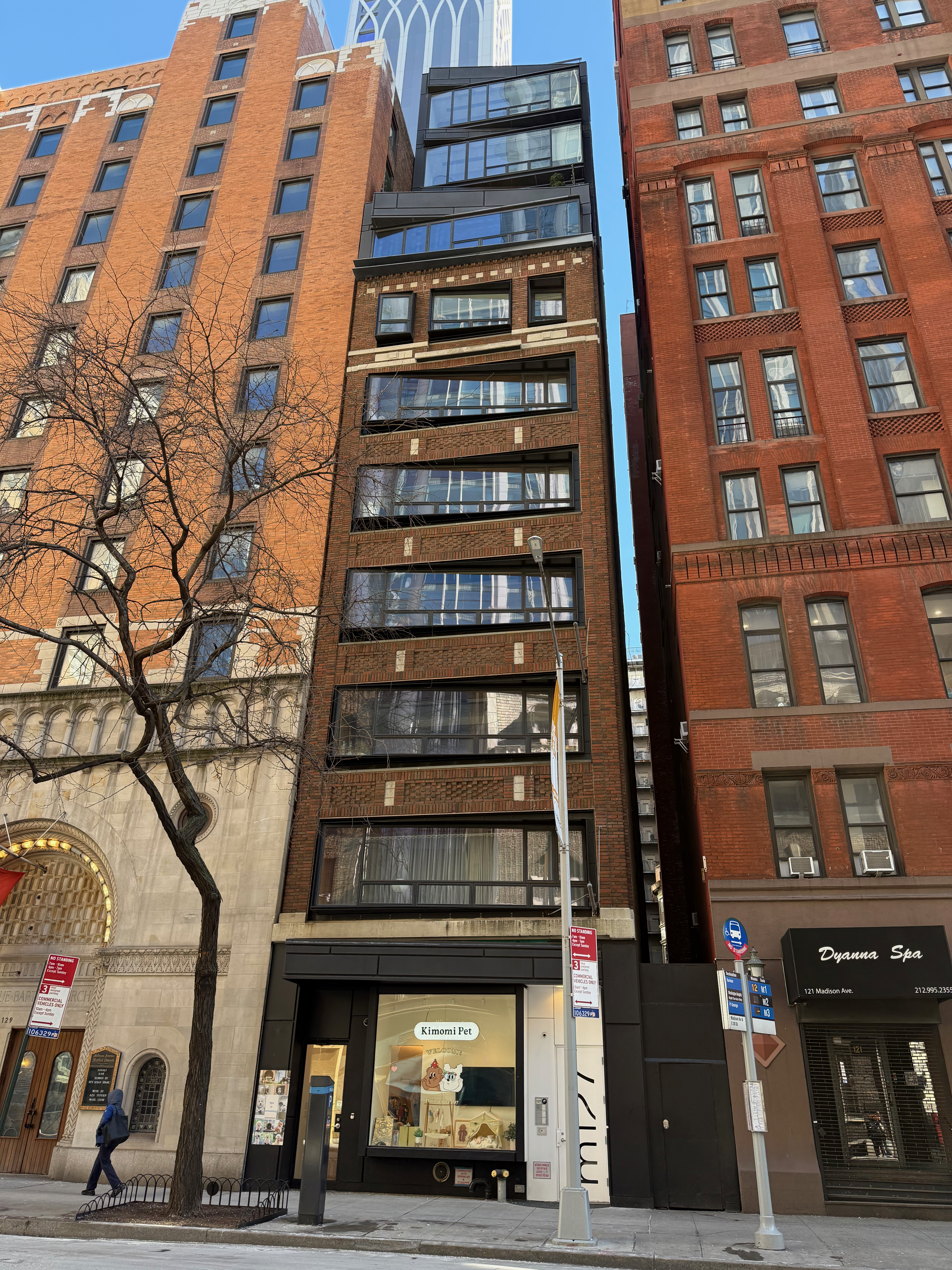
127 Madison Avenue, a low-rise sliver

The sliver law specifies that narrow frontage buildings with the heights that exceed the widths of the streets or 100 feet (30 m) whichever is less are to be considered as tall sliver buildings which are prohibited in many zones. With this restriction, the buildings do not need to be very tall to be considered sliver. For example, a narrow street of 70 feet (21 m) would make buildings on that street with less than 45 feet (14 m) wide and more than 70 feet (21 m) tall to be sliver buildings. Some examples of those are, 127 Madison Avenue, an eight-story building sandwiched between two bulkier and taller buildings, and 1055 Park Avenue, a twelve-story building that has the width of 20 feet (6.1 m).

== See also ==
- Pencil tower: buildings with high slenderness ratios
- Sliver (film)
- List of sliver buildings
