= The Summit (Hong Kong) =

Residential skyscraper in Hong Kong

Summit
- 御峰
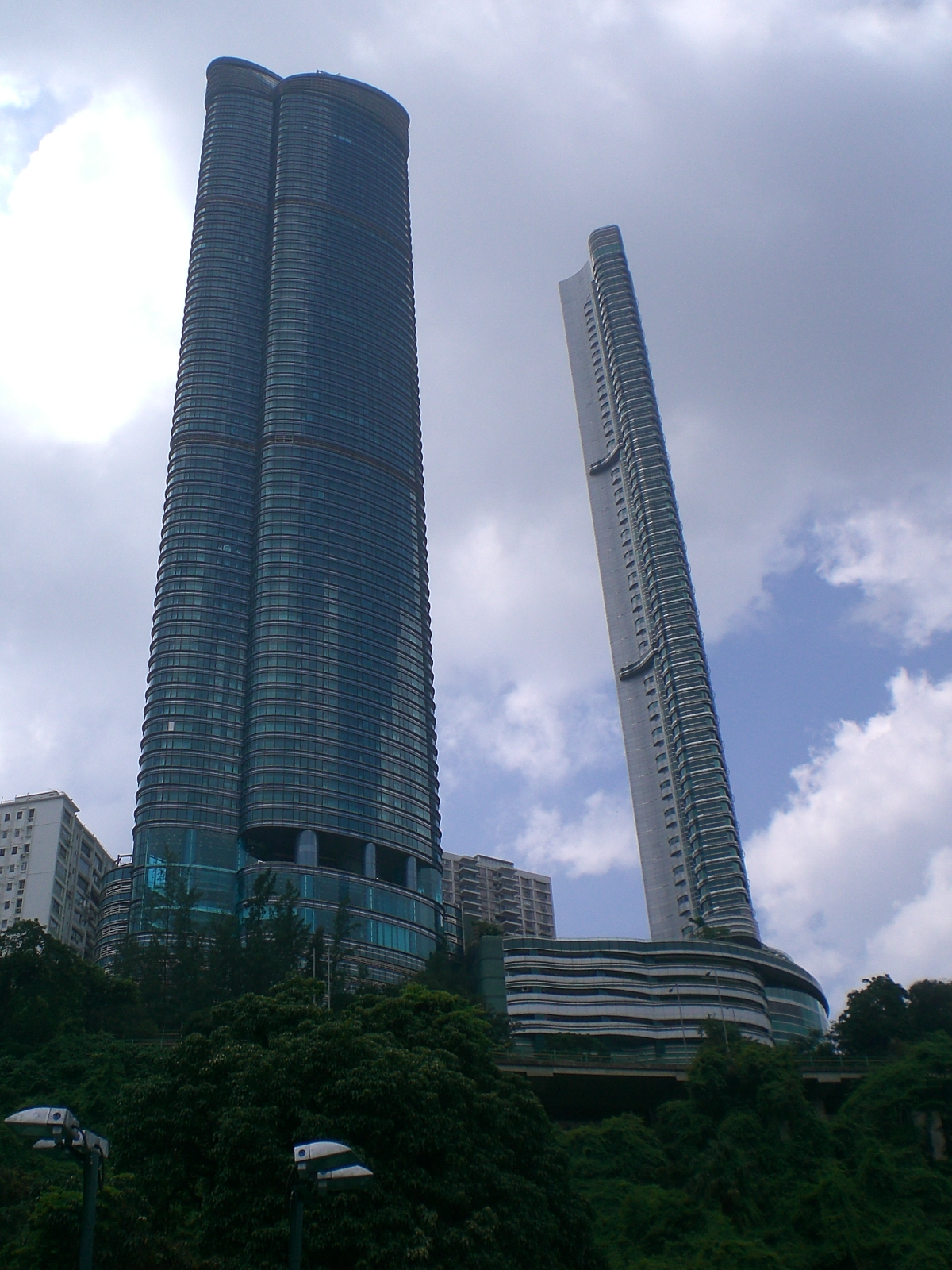
- Summit (right) and Highcliff (left)
- Interactive map of the Summit area

General information
- Type: Residential
- Location: Mid-Levels, Hong Kong
- Coordinates: 22°15′55.9″N 114°11′01″E
- Construction started: 1999
- Completed: 2001

Height
- Roof: 219.8 m (721.1 ft)

Technical details
- Floor count: 65

Design and construction
- Architects: Dennis Lau & Ng Chun Man Architects & Engineers (HK) Ltd.
- Structural engineer: Magnusson Klemencic Associates

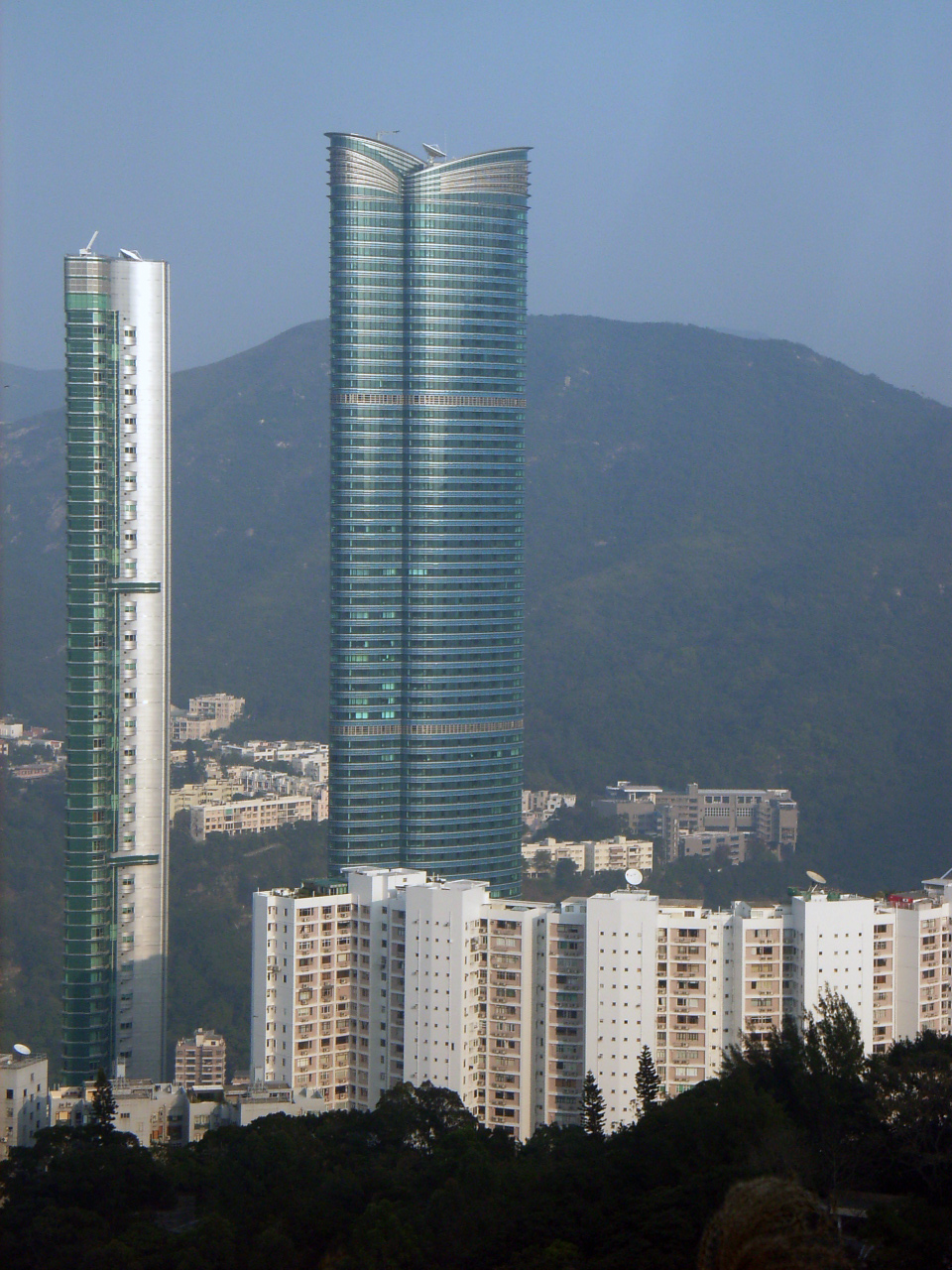
The Summit (left) with Highcliff

Summit (Chinese: 御峰; Jyutping: jyu^{6} fung^{1}) is a residential skyscraper located in upper Mid-Levels, Hong Kong. It is one of the tallest residential buildings in the city, standing at 220 metres (722 ft) tall, with 65 storeys. Construction of the building began in 1999 and it opened in 2001. Highcliff, another tall skyscraper, stands right next to this building.

Due to the visual effect of its proximity to Highcliff, another very thin and tall building, the two together are often referred to as "The Chopsticks". These two buildings highlight the characters of pencil-thin towers that are highly concentrated in Hong Kong.

== See also ==
- List of tallest buildings in Hong Kong
