= One Madison =

Residential skyscraper in Manhattan, New York

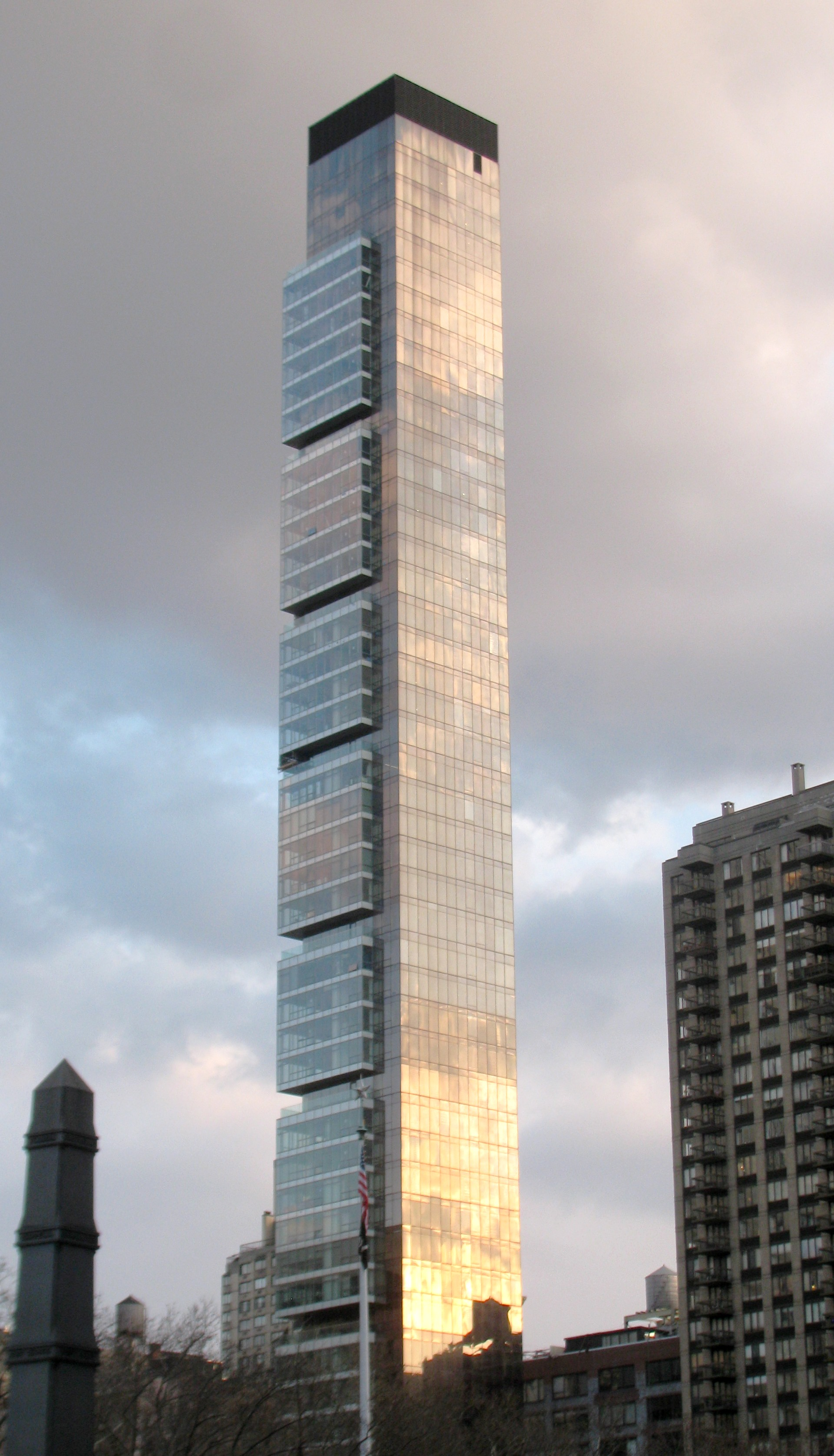
- 2013 street view to the southeast
- Former names: The Saya; One Madison Park

General information
- Type: Residential condominium
- Location: 23 East 22nd Street, Manhattan, New York City, United States
- Coordinates: 40°44′26″N 73°59′17″W
- Construction started: 2006
- Topped-out: 2010
- Completed: 2013
- Landlord: Consortium of creditors

Height
- Height: 621 feet (189 m)

Technical details
- Structural system: Shear walled frame
- Floor count: 60 (51 units)
- Floor area: 16,763 m^{2} (180,440 sq ft)

Design and construction
- Architecture firm: CetraRuddy
- Other designers: Rem Koolhaas; Yabu Pushelberg (interiors)

Website
- 1madisonnyc.com

One Madison is a luxury residential condominium tower located on 23rd Street between Broadway and Park Avenue South, at the southern end of Madison Avenue, across from Madison Square Park in the Flatiron District of Manhattan, New York City. The building's official address and main lobby entrance is at 23 East 22nd Street, rather than at 1 Madison Avenue; there is no public entrance on 23rd Street.

The building as constructed has 51 residential units across 60 stories. Construction started in 2006, and it topped out during 2010, but it remained incomplete for another three years due to financial difficulties. At a height of 621 feet (189.3 m), One Madison is one of the slenderest buildings in the world, with a height-to-width ratio of 12:1.

== History ==
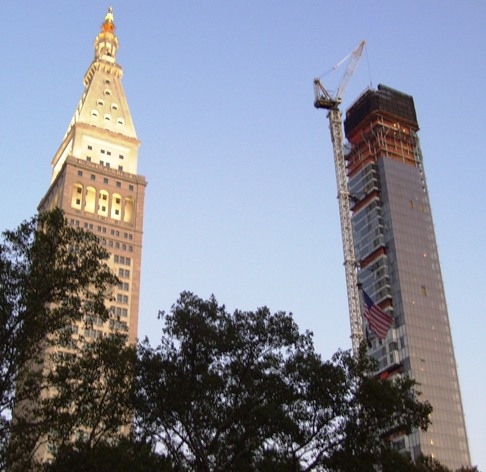
The building under construction in September 2008; the landmarked Metropolitan Life Clock Tower is on the left.

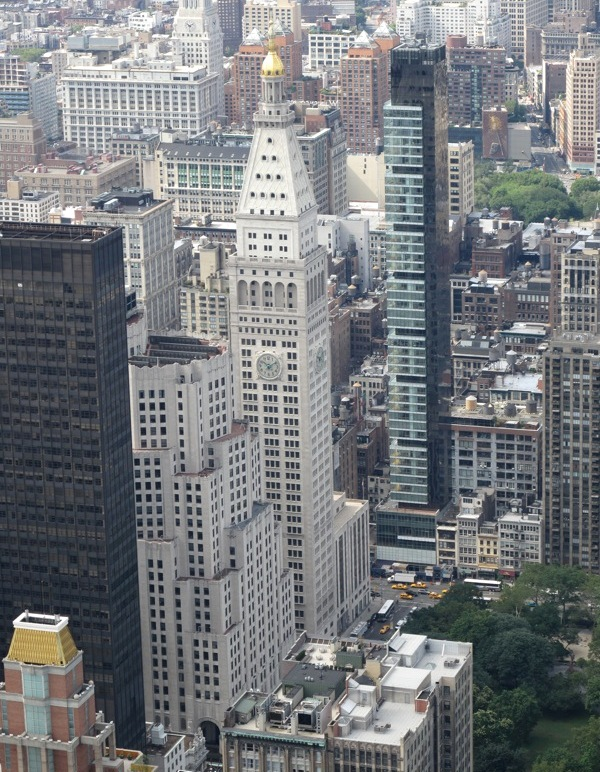
One Madison Park is the tall, thin building on the right in the background. The Met Life Tower, the Metropolitan Life North Building, and the black New York Merchandise Mart are in the foreground.

Although much of the area nearby is included in various historic districts – such as the Ladies' Mile Historic District, Gramercy Park Historic District, and Madison Square North Historic District – the location of One Madison is not, enabling the building to be constructed "as of right" with the transfer of air rights from the shorter buildings that surround the site.

=== Construction ===
When the building was originally announced, it was to be 47 stories and called The Saya. The name was changed to One Madison Park around the time that construction began in 2006 and then to One Madison after it was taken over by the Related Companies. The building as constructed has 60 stories.

By April 2010, the building had topped out but was still not complete, having run into financial difficulties. Sales of residential units had stopped, but the appointment of a receiver on April 15 allowed sales to start again. The building continued to be mired in financial and legal problems, including multiple lawsuits and allegations of fraud, and was forced into bankruptcy by some of its creditors in June 2010.

At one point, a 22-story building designed by noted architect Rem Koolhaas was to be the building's "companion" on 22nd Street, but later plans called for an 11-story building designed by CetraRuddy, the firm that designed One Madison; although at the time construction began in January 2013, permits had reportedly been issued for a 6-story building, which will include the entrance lobby and two duplex apartments. The companion building, designed by BKSK Architects to feature a terracotta and glass facade, will be the primary entrance to the building.

=== Post-completion ===
By 2013, ownership of the building had passed to a consortium of creditors, including the Related Companies, the CIM Group, and HFZ Capital Group, who completed construction and resumed sales that year. As of February 2014, seventy-five percent of the building's units had been sold.

== Architecture ==
The building was designed by the architectural firm CetraRuddy. It features 360-degree views and contains 53 residential units, topped by a 6,850-square-foot triplex penthouse with a 586-square-foot wraparound terrace.

=== Structural features ===
The building's first five stories contain service and commercial spaces on the ground floor, above which are mechanical spaces and the building's amenities. These five floors act as a base for the building's tower, which is partly cantilevered over an existing three-story building to the east.

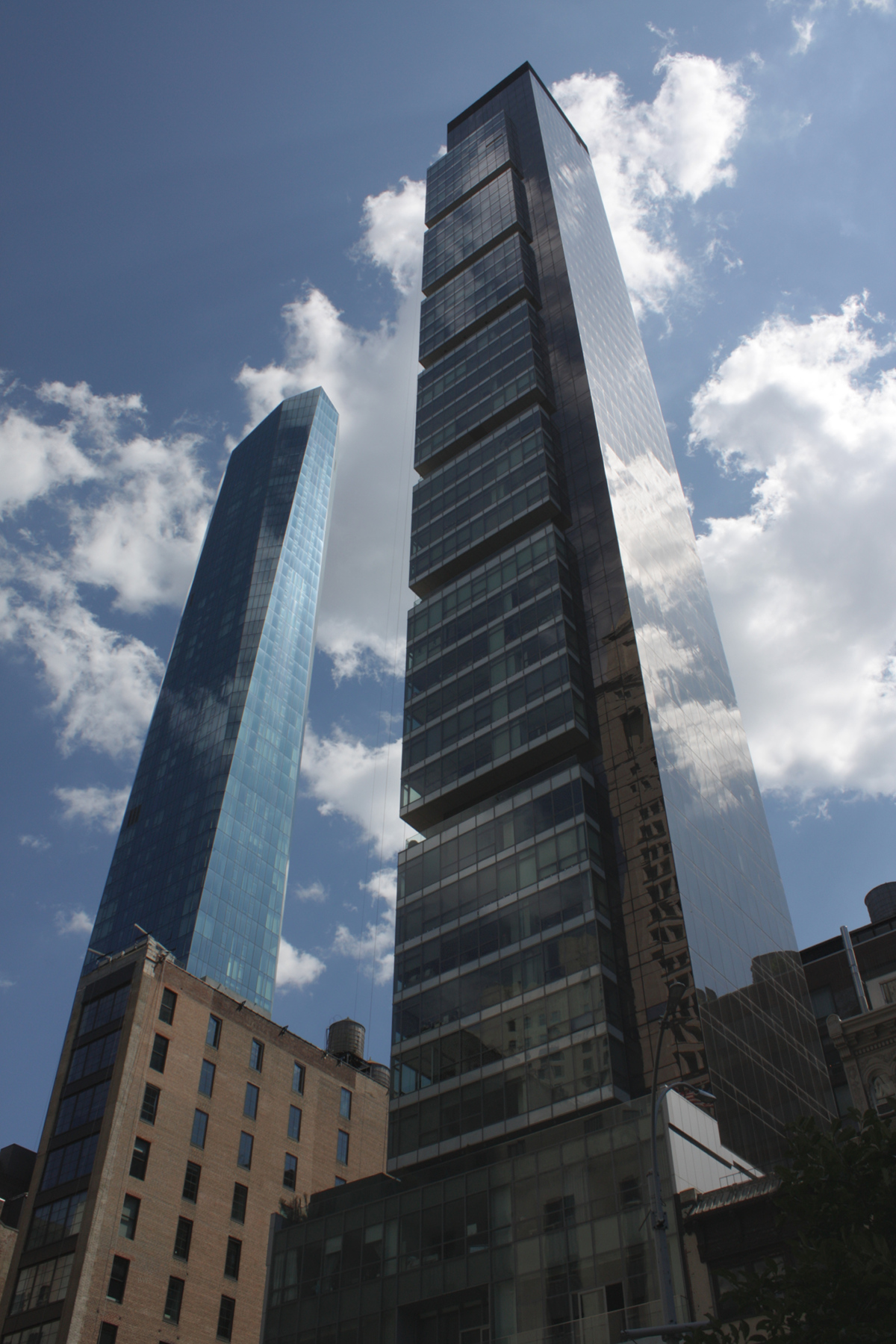
One Madison's height of 621 feet was surpassed by Madison Square Park Tower's (left) 777 feet in 2017.

The cross-section of One Madison's tower is 50 ft x 53 ft (15.25 m x 16.15 m), which makes it, at the height of 621 feet (189.3 m), one of the slenderest buildings in New York City; its height-to-width ratio is 12:1. To accommodate the architectural design of the building, which called for windows on all sides, lateral bracing that would normally be placed around the tower's perimeter is located in the center in a cruciform shape, creating internal shear walls in an optimal configuration. To cope with lateral winds and potential seismic forces, the shear walls were made with high-performance concrete. One Madison also utilizes a tuned liquid damping system on the roof consisting of three U-shaped reinforced concrete tanks full of water. These counter the building's lateral motion by about 3%.

=== Apartments and amenities ===
When Related Companies took control of One Madison, about half of the units were finished, with interiors designed by CetraRuddy, the architecture firm that designed the building's exterior. For the remaining apartments, which were in various states of completion, the new owners hired the interior design firm Yabu Pushelberg, which also created the interiors of the new main lobby and the amenity spaces, and hired the lighting design firm Cooley Monato Studio who developed architectural lighting of the apartments, the main lobby, the amenity spaces, and exterior facade.

Rem Koolhaas designed the interiors of many of the condominium's originally planned amenities, which included a private screening room, an upscale restaurant run by chef Charlie Trotter, a spa and fitness room, and a wine cellar. After the building came under Related's control, the amenities were announced as including a lounge and screening room, private dining room, a fitness center and a room for yoga, a 50-foot (15 m) lap pool and steam room, and a playroom for children. A full-time doorman is enhanced with concierge service.

== Residents ==
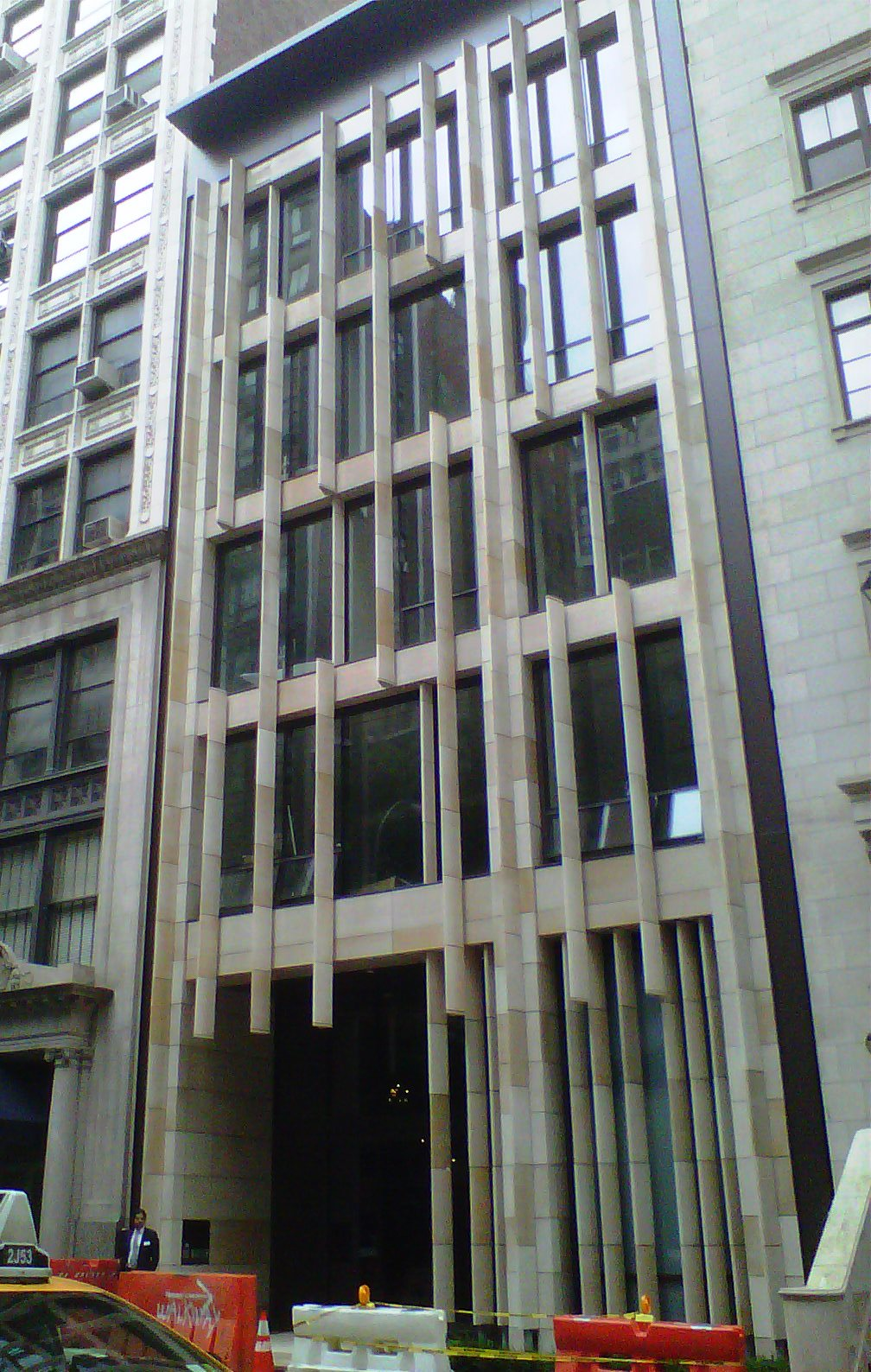
The entrance building at 23 East 22nd Street, seen in September 2014.

NFL quarterback Tom Brady and his former wife Gisele Bündchen owned one $14-million suite and rented out a similar apartment in One Madison. Peter Buffett, son of Warren Buffett, used to live in One Madison. Fredrik Eklund, a noted New York City realtor, author of The Sell, and a principal in the reality TV series Million Dollar Listing New York, used to rent at One Madison, but had moved out by 2016.

News Corp chairman Rupert Murdoch bought the building's triplex penthouse and another full-floor apartment below it for a total of $57.3 million in February 2014. The original asking price for the penthouse was $45 million, and was originally announced as including a butler with his own one-bedroom apartment on a lower floor. Prior to Related's takeover of the building, the penthouse was under contract for $32 million, but that deal never closed.

== Critical reception ==
Nicolai Ouroussoff, the architecture critic for The New York Times, called One Madison Park "a dazzling addition to a street that includes two of the city’s most celebrated skyscrapers: Pierre LeBrun’s 1909 Metropolitan Life Tower, across the street, and Daniel Burnham's 1903 Flatiron Building, a half block west. It jolts the neighborhood into the present." In the New York Observer, Dana Rubinstein wrote that the tower was "not ugly", but that "in its overpowering, hubristic way, kind of pretty." Architect Dan Kaplan is quoted on a Wall Street Journal weblog as saying that the building is an "elegant, thin stalk", and represents a continuation of a long-held vision of Manhattan. Kaplan does say, however, that the sliver building "turn[s] its back, a little bit, on the park". Architect Gordon Gill, of the firm Adrian Smith + Gordon Gill Architecture, say of the building that it was "Simply a unique and elegant solution derived without relying on excessive form making to create an 'identity' for itself."

In 2014, the building received the Architizer A+ Jury Award for Residential High Rise. Since 2013, it has been part of the "Sky High & the Logic of Luxury" exhibition at the Skyscraper Museum in Lower Manhattan.
