= Slenderness ratio =

Ratio of width and height in architecture

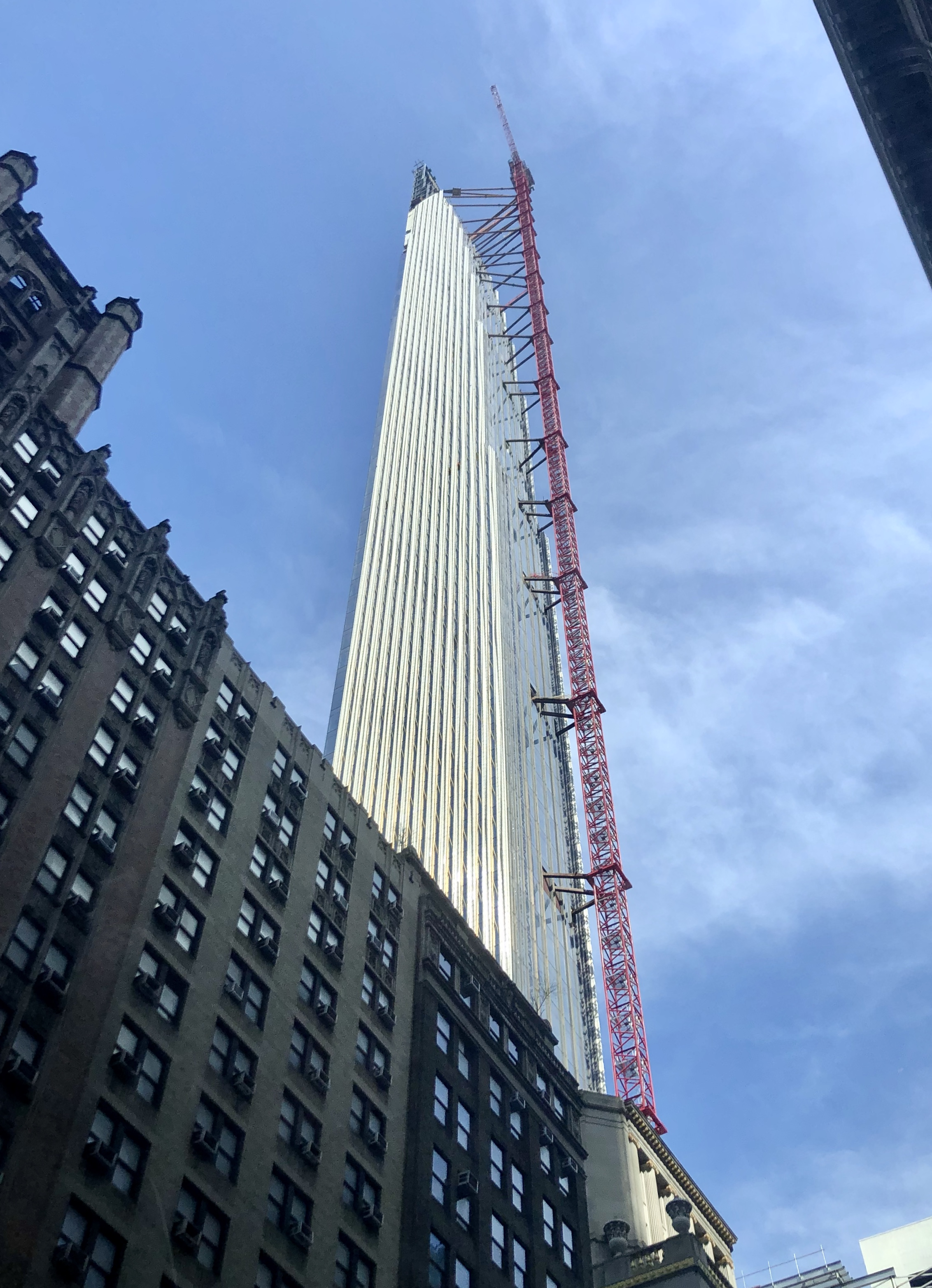
111 West 57th Street in Midtown Manhattan is the world's most slender skyscraper.

In architecture, the slenderness ratio, or simply slenderness, is an aspect ratio, the quotient between the height and the width of a building.

In structural engineering, slenderness is used to calculate the propensity of a column to buckle. It is defined as $l/k$ where $l$ is the effective length of the column and $k$ is the least radius of gyration, the latter defined by $k^2=I/A$ where $A$ is the area of the cross-section of the column and $I$ is the second moment of area of the cross-section. The effective length is calculated from the actual length of the member considering the rotational and relative translational boundary conditions at the ends. Slenderness captures the influence on buckling of all the geometric aspects of the column, namely its length, area, and second moment of area. The influence of the material is represented separately by the material's modulus of elasticity $E$.

Structural engineers generally consider a skyscraper as slender if the height:width ratio exceeds 10:1 or 12:1. Slim towers require the adoption of specific measures to counter the high strength of wind in the vertical cantilever, like including additional structures to endow greater rigidity to the building or diverse types of tuned mass dampers to avoid unwanted swinging.

Tall buildings with high slenderness ratio are sometimes referred to as pencil towers.

== Examples ==
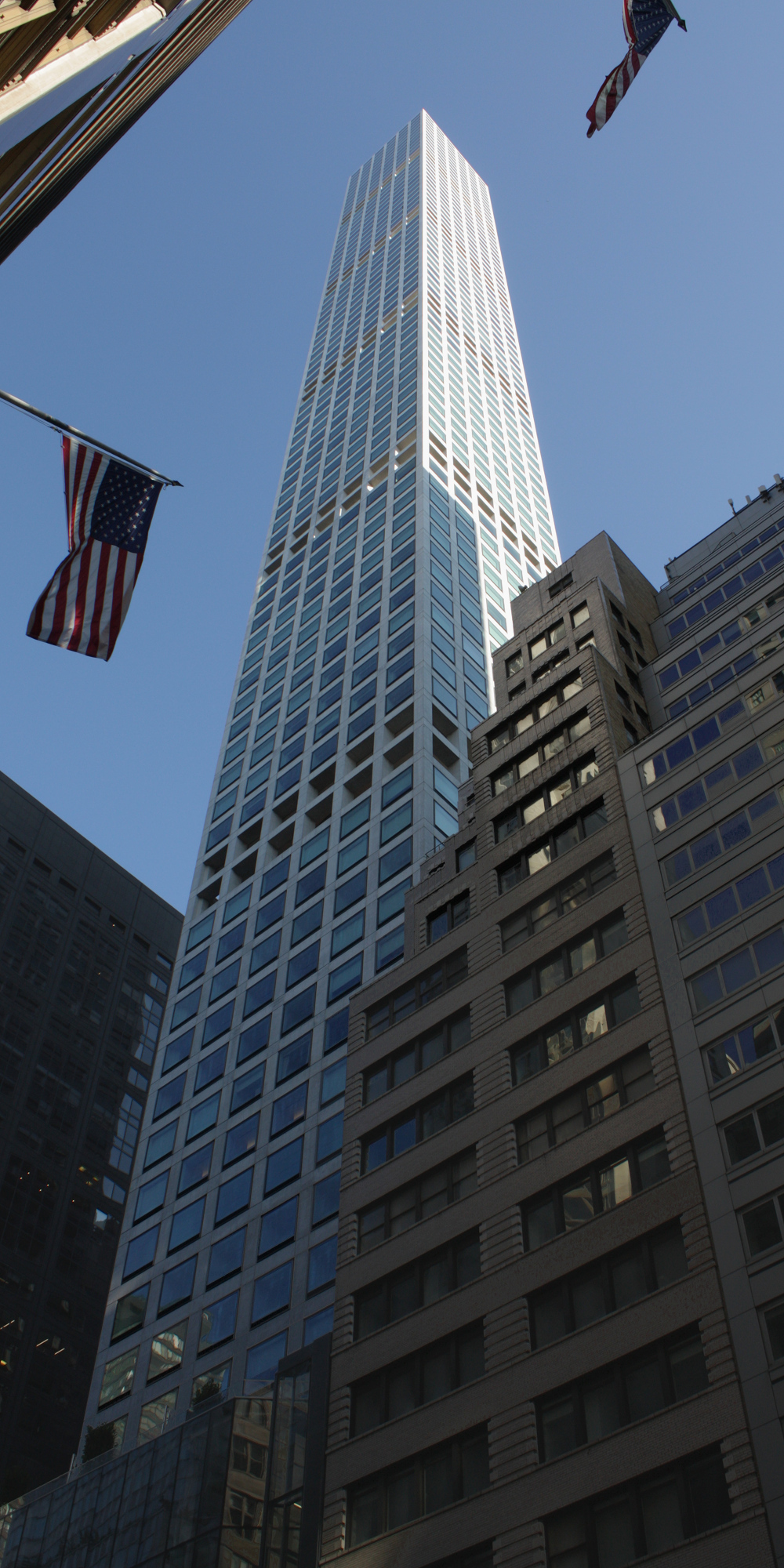
432 Park Avenue

Building	Location	Floors	Height (m)	Slenderness	Year
111 West 57th Street	New York, NY	82	438	24:1	2018
Highcliff	Happy Valley, Hong Kong	73	252	20:1	2003
150 North Riverside	Chicago, Illinois	54	228	20:1 at base	2017
220 Central Park South	New York, NY	70	290	18:1	2019
Collins House (Melbourne)	Melbourne, Australia	61	190	16.25:1	2019
432 Park Avenue	New York, NY	85	426	15:1	2015
One Madison Park	New York, NY	50	188	12:1	2016
Sky House	New York, NY	55	179	Between 12:1 and 20:1	2008
Icon	New York, NY	42	158	Between 15:1 and 18:1	2009
