= Pencil tower =

Slender type of skyscraper

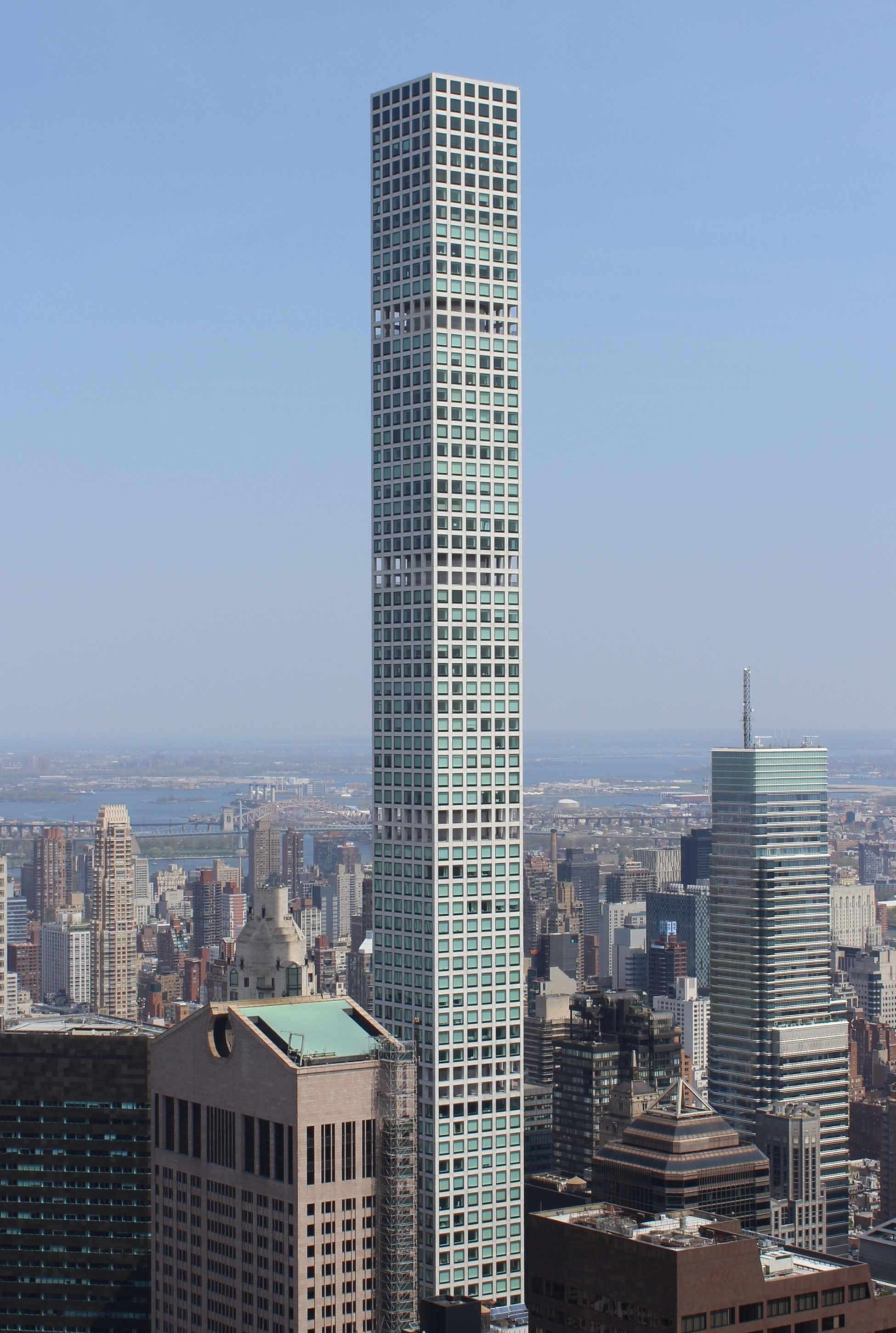
432 Park Avenue (middle), a pencil tower in New York City

A pencil tower (also known as a skinny skyscraper, pencil-thin tower, super-slender tower, or super-slim tower) is a high-rise building or skyscraper with a very high slenderness ratio, meaning it is very tall while being very thin. There is no universal definition of how slender these buildings are to be categorized, but some definitions of 10:1 or 12:1 ratios and higher have been used.

Hong Kong started developing pencil towers in the 1970s. Residential buildings of twenty or more stories with one unit per floor were built over small lots. It has become one of the most common types of buildings in the city, making Hong Kong the world's highest concentration of pencil towers. Hong Kong's most notable towers are the 72-story Highcliff Tower, which has a slenderness ratio of 20:1, and its neighbor, The Summit, a 65-story residential building.

In the 2010s, pencil towers became a new phenomenon of building design in New York City. The newer pencil towers on Manhattan's "Billionaires' Row" (a thin strip of Midtown near Central Park) are mostly supertalls. The first of this new crop of super-slim towers was the 1,005 foot One57 tower. Two pencil towers on a section of 57th Street made the street the most expensive address in the global real estate market, with 41 transactions above US$25 million from 2015 to 2019.

Outside of Hong Kong and New York City, Melbourne has become the center of pencil towers.

== History ==
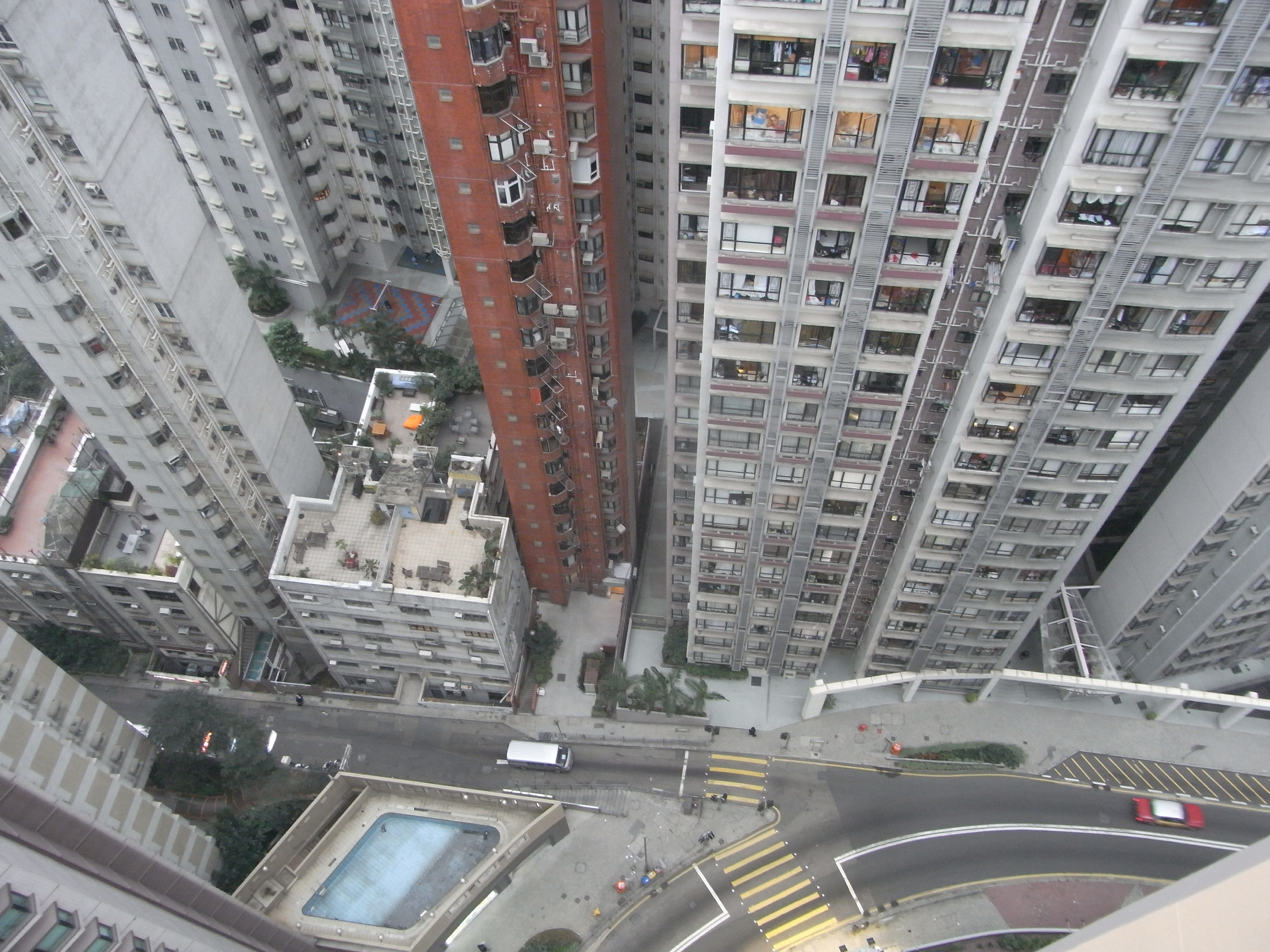
Maxluck Court (left) and Fook Kee Court (brown) are examples of typical pencil towers in Mid-Levels, Hong Kong

Early slender skyscrapers were first developed in Manhattan in the late 19th and early 20th century (before zoning laws). The new designs were encouraged by an increase in the price of land and enabled by the use of elevators and steel frame construction which allowed buildings to be built taller. The Metropolitan Life Insurance Company Tower is an example of the slim buildings of that era. Finished 1911, it is 700 feet (210 m) tall with floor dimensions of 75 by 85 feet (23 by 26 m).

When the Equitable Building's shadow influenced the passage of a 1916 Zoning Resolution, street canyon shapes became regulated but 25% of the property was exempt. This caused building designs of the era to have a wide base and thinner tower covering a quarter of the lot area. The Pierre and The Sherry-Netherland are examples of slender towers of the time which were allowed to be built close to Central Park.

New York's subsequent 1961 Zoning Resolution set tip height limits for the first time and replaced the shape limits with floor area ratio ones. It also allowed transferable development rights which gave birth to the concept of buying air rights from nearby lots.

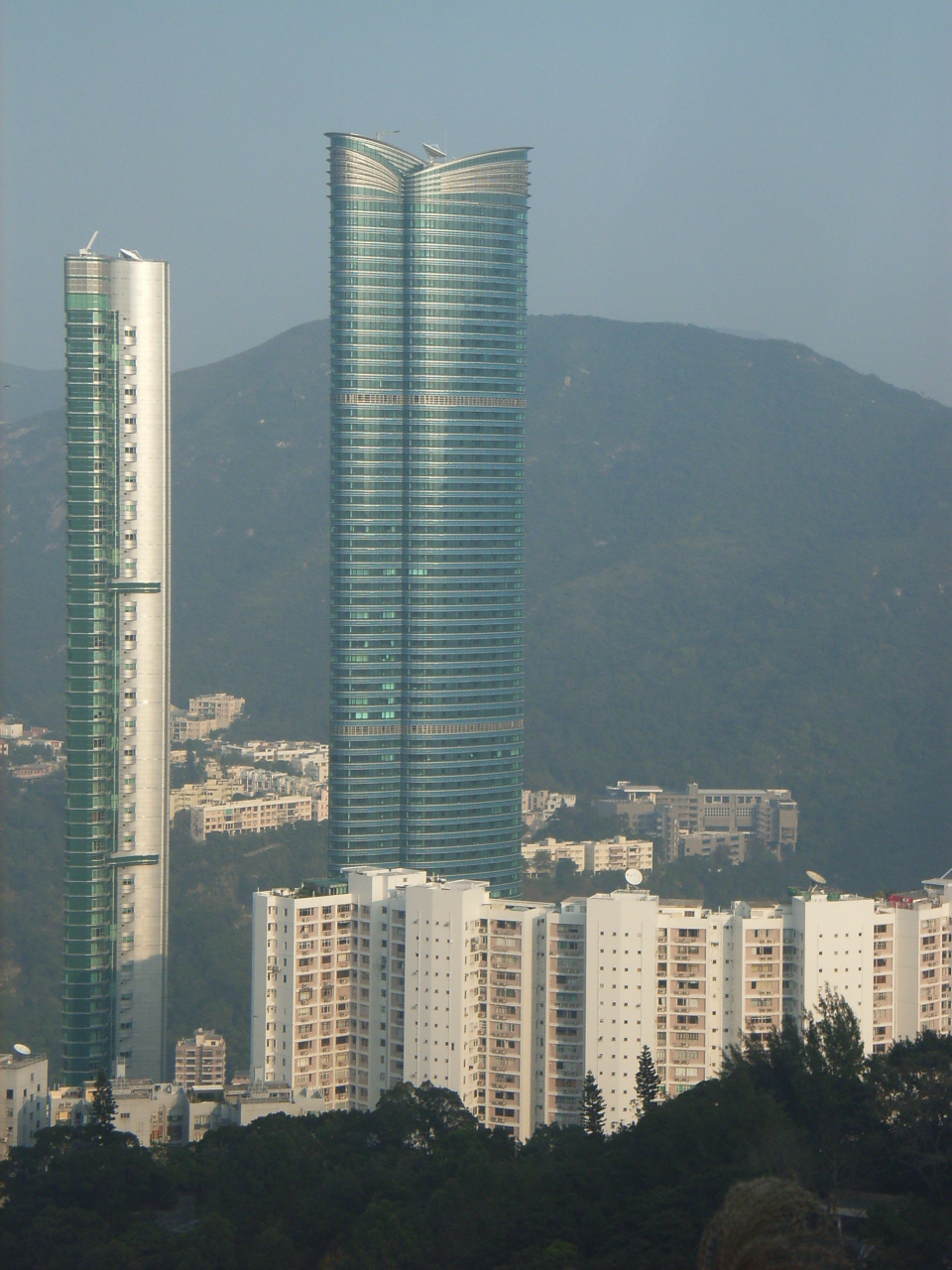
The Summit (left) and Highcliff (right) in Hong Kong

In the 1970s Hong Kong was in a similar position of high land values and lax zoning laws, and started building pencil towers. Multiple factors contributed: in 1964 the Hong Kong Housing Authority finished the Choi Hung Estate for 43,000 residents who suffered from a massive fire in 1953. Those public housing units were 280 square feet (26 m^{2}) to 450 square feet (42 m^{2}) which set a new expectation for the sizes of residential units in private developments. The cost of land leasing for residential developments was also a big factor in the building designs at that time. Hong Kong's government owned all the land and leased some out for private development through auctions for various terms, such as 50, 75, 99 and 999 years. Developers needed to pay tens of thousands of HK$ for leasing each square meter (11 sq ft) of land. Meanwhile, some innovative building designs emerged. The use of scissor staircases, in which two fire escape staircases intertwined, shrank the width of the fire escape void, allowing buildings to be narrower. These factors incentivized developers to build slender residential towers on small lots with one unit per floor. Developers only needed to acquire a lot with a frontage area of two small retail shops (two tong lau buildings) in order to build a tower of 20 stories or more. This was when the term "pencil towers" was used to describe these micro-developments. Currently, a 430-square-foot (40 m^{2}) unit on a pencil tower has an average price of HK$4.3 million. (US$0.55 million)

Pencil towers became one of the most typical building types in Hong Kong, beside tong lau and cruciform apartments. Overall, buildings with a slenderness ratio of up to 18:1 have dominated the Mid-Levels residential district, making Hong Kong the "world capital" of pencil-thin towers. In the 21st century Hong Kong pencil tower developments started to get much larger in scale than previous decades. In 2001, The Summit, a 65-story upscale residential building was completed. It was followed in 2003 by the world record 20:1 ratio, 72-story building, the Highcliff until 2019 when 111 West 57th Street topped out at 24:1. These developments highlighted the potentials of tall luxury pencil towers.

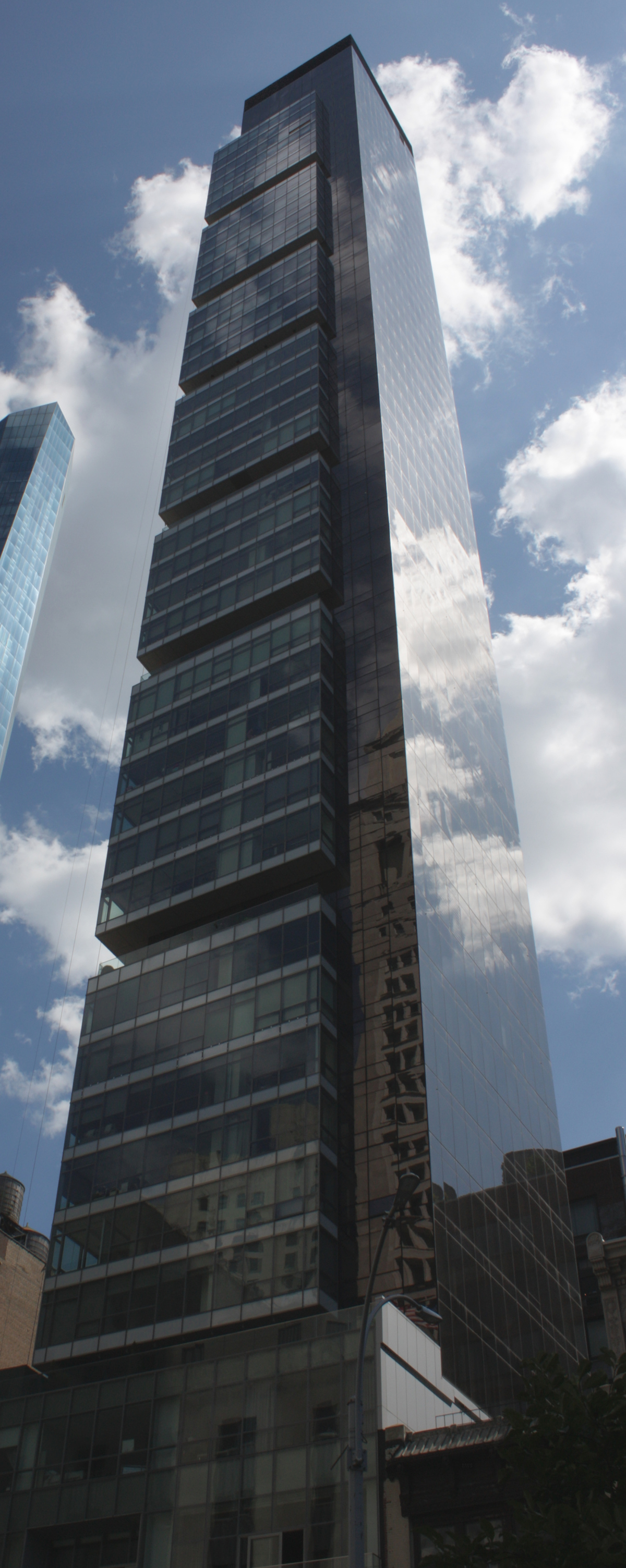
One Madison, Manhattan

In the early 21st century, the pencil tower concept for residential towers also expanded outside of Hong Kong and returned to New York City. Developers utilized the transferable development rights and innovative structural engineering to elevate the buildings as high as possible for spectacular views while requiring the smallest footprints possible. The term "pencil towers" has been used to describe a new type of tall and slender buildings in New York City as well. Early examples of the new trend were Sky House Condominium, a 588-foot (179 m) building on a 45-foot (14 m) lot, and One Madison, a 50-story building with a 12:1 ratio. These were followed by more than a dozen pencil towers built in the 2010s.

== Challenges ==
=== Engineering ===
Building materials have improved in recent decades. The strengths of concrete have been changed from 10,000–12,000 psi to 18,000–20,000 psi (69–83 to 120–140 MPa). Reinforcing steel with higher strengths of 100 ksi (100,000 psi, 690 MPa) became more available. Higher-strength materials can reduce thickness of concrete walls, reducing the amount of required interior structures. This is a critical factor that enables super-slender building designs.

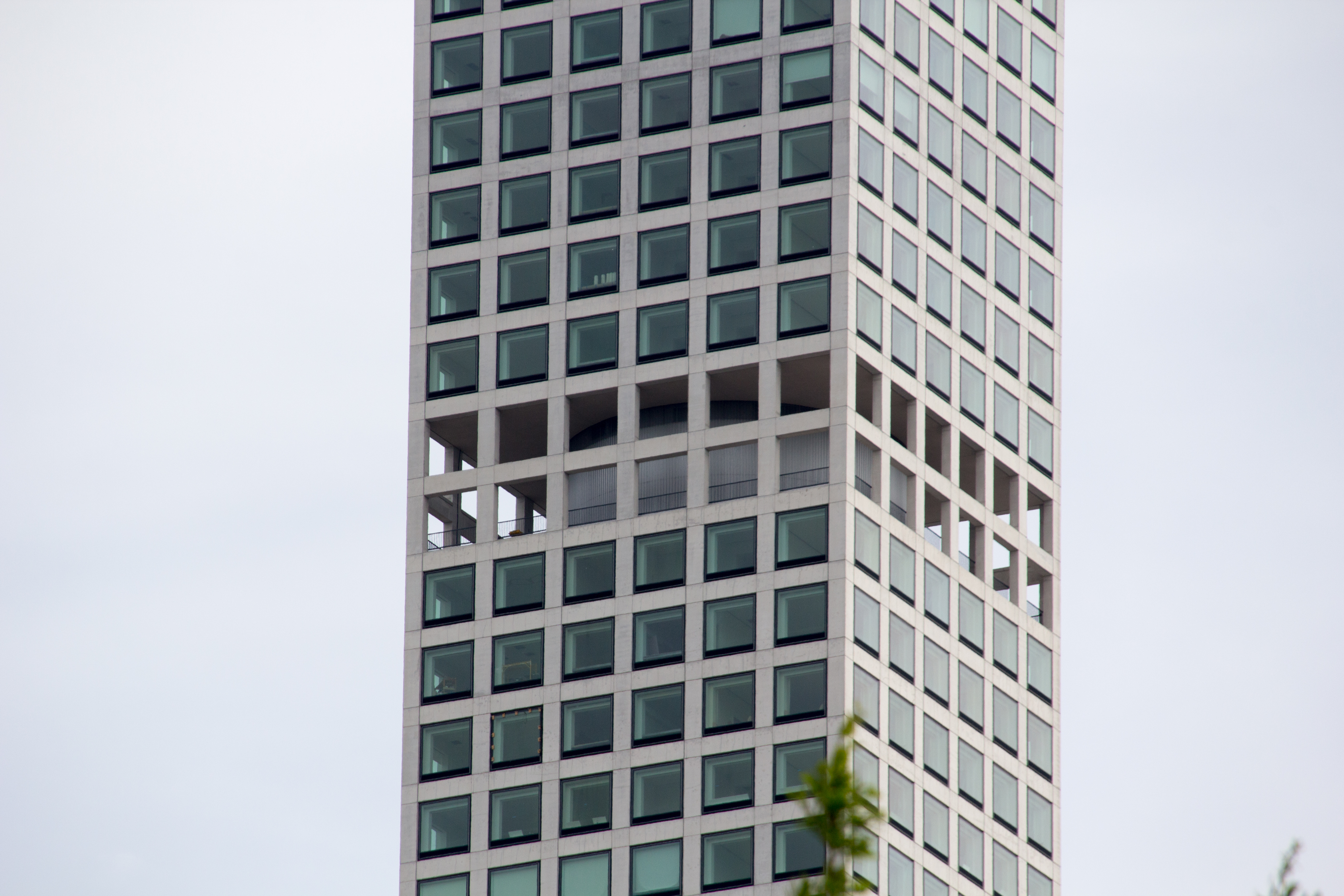
Open-air mechanical floors of 432 Park Avenue

A main challenge of super-slender buildings is the management of lateral movements due to wind loads, which can cause discomfort for occupants. Various engineering techniques are used to address this issue. One approach to manage the wind loads is to use an open mechanical floor in the middle of a building to allow wind to flow through. This can reduce the wind loads and the resulting movements by 10%-15%. An example of this technique can be seen in 432 Park Avenue, a 15:1 ratio building that has many open-air mechanical floors. Another approach is to stiffen the structure to resist the loads. This can be done by using outrigger walls to connect the building core to the perimeter columns on two sides to distribute the loads. The structure of 111 West 57th Street uses shear walls on the east and west facades to stiffen the structure while leaving the north and south views unobstructed.

To manage building movements, a tuned mass damper can be used. This is a passive device with a large mass mounted on shock absorbers to slow the movements of the building. Typically they are made of solid mass, but recently liquid damping systems have been used. A liquid damping system or sloshing damper is a tank of water with screens to control the movements of the water, specifically tuned such that when building is moved in one direction, the liquid force goes in the opposite direction to offset the movements. Highcliff is one of the early adopters of such system.

Building footing is another area of concerns. As the slender buildings have smaller footprints, the foundations need to go down deeper.

=== Firefighting ===
Pencil towers present challenges to firefighting. The scissor staircases are narrower and they may have five or more turns for each floor. This reduces space available for firefighting operations and medical staging, and can impede water flow through fire hoses repeatedly bent around curves. Open-air mechanical floors, especially those of New York City pencil towers, can enable wind to fuel fires.

== Examples ==
=== Australia ===
Melbourne's first pencil tower was the 2013 Phoenix Apartments building, which rises on a 6.7-metre (22 ft)-wide lot. The plan originally called for a 40-story building. After oppositions from concerned neighbors, the design was revised to 28 stories at a height of 88.5 metres (290 ft), which was still slender with a height-to-width ratio of 13.5:1. That was soon followed by Collins House, a 195-metre (640 ft) skyscraper that has the width of its base at 11.5 metres (38 ft). At 16.5:1, it was the world's fourth-slenderest tower at the time. Collins House incorporated many advancements in technology including the first of such towers to use prefabrication of 3D structural elements to help navigate narrow project site. A combination of air rights purchase and large cantilevers helped maximizing its floor space. In 2018, a design of a 330-metre (1,080 ft) tower sitting on top of a triangular plot in Melbourne was submitted for planning approval. If built, The Magic would become the world's slenderest tower by a ratio of 26.6:1 based on the shorter side of its widths in a triangular footprint. If it had a rectangular base, a similar-size building would have an 18:1 ratio.

=== Canada ===
In 2020, Dutch developers proposed to build an 87-story mixed-use pencil tower at 1200 Bay Street in Toronto to replace a 12-story office building. It follows the form of pencil towers of New York. However, with its 11:1 ratio, the slenderest in Toronto, it falls short of matching those New York towers.

=== Hong Kong ===
In Hong Kong, the Mid-Levels area is home of many pencil towers, such as Tregunter 3 of the Tregunter Towers. The Highcliff tower, located in the neighbouring Happy Valley area, was the world's slenderest tower (20:1 ratio) at the time of completion.

=== India ===
The Four Seasons Private Residences in Mumbai is the slenderest tower in India. It was completed in 2021 with a height of 250 metres (820 ft) and a slenderness ratio of 10:1.

=== United Kingdom ===
In 2020, Birmingham City Council approved a plan to construct a 9.5-metre (31 ft) wide and 116.5-metre (382 ft) tall building. This would be the first super-slender tower in the United Kingdom.

=== United States ===
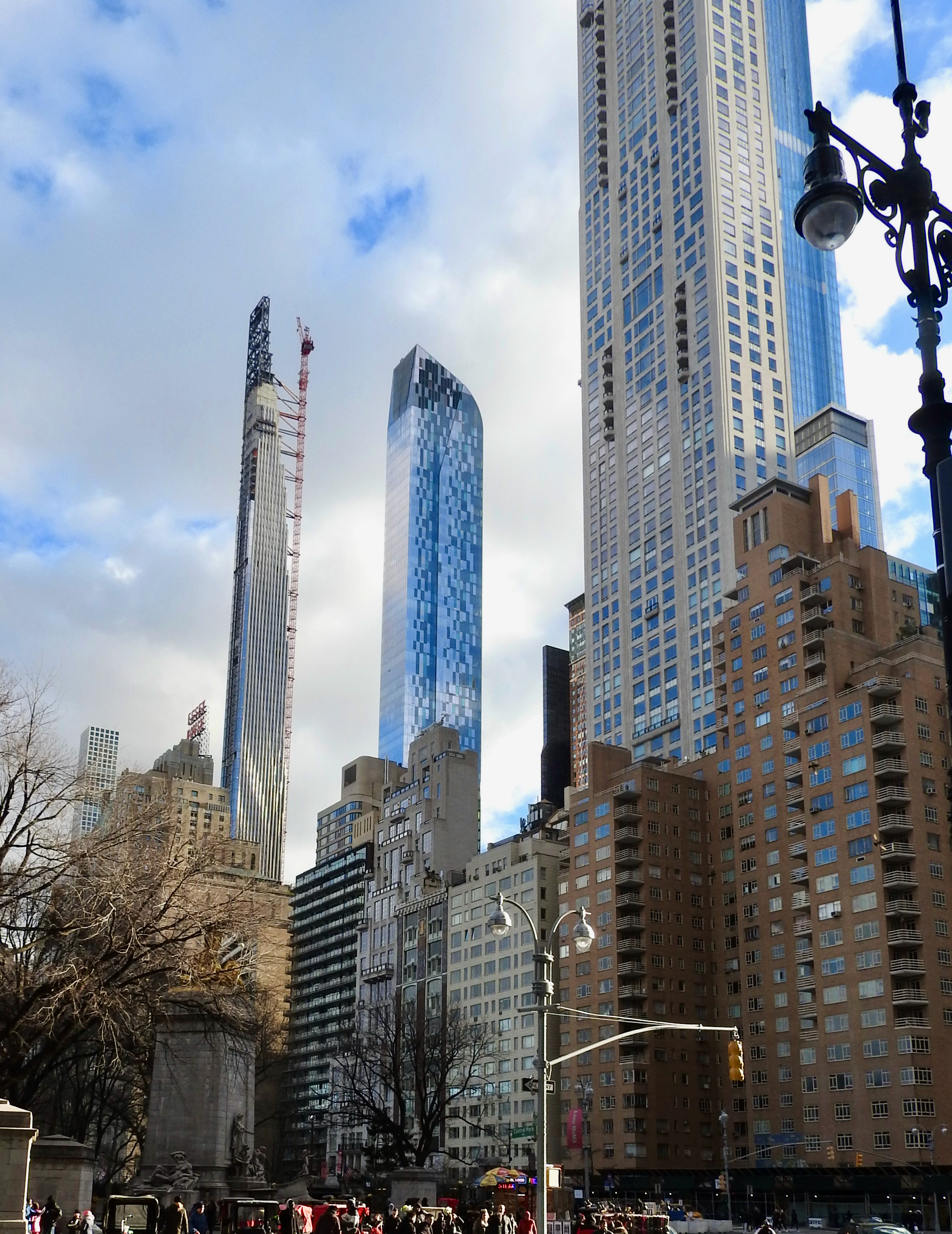
432 Park Avenue (left, farmost), 111 West 57th Street (center left, under construction), One57 (middle, blue), 220 Central Park South (right foreground, gray) and Central Park Tower (right background, blue)

The Skyscraper Museum cited Sky House (2008), a 55-story building made possible by a purchase of air rights from the Little Church Around the Corner, as an early example of New York's super-slender towers. One Madison, a 621-foot (189 m) tower that incorporates seven volumetric pods to extend the tower's floor plate, was completed soon after Sky House.

There were several more buildings completed after 2014. These include: One57, the first supertall pencil tower in New York; 432 Park Avenue, a 15:1 ratio 1,396-foot (426 m) building that has five open-air mechanical floors throughout its height; 220 Central Park South, a 18:1 ratio building that uses the first 200 feet (61 m) of its 950-foot (290 m) height for mechanical equipment to stiffen the building; 111 West 57th Street, the world's slenderest tower at a ratio of 24:1; and Central Park Tower, a 1,550-foot (470 m) tower that sets aside 350 feet (110 m) as mechanical space to build taller than would have otherwise been allowed.
