= Collins House (Melbourne) =

Residential tower in Melbourne, Victoria, Australia

Collins House Melbourne
- Location within Melbourne
- Alternative names: 464 Collins Street

General information
- Status: Completed
- Type: Residential high-rise pencil tower
- Architectural style: Neomodern
- Location: 464-466 Collins Street, Melbourne, Victoria, Australia
- Coordinates: 37°49′03″S 144°57′31″E
- Year built: 2016–2019
- Completed: 2019; 7 years ago

Height
- Height: 190 m (620 ft)

Technical details
- Floor count: 57
- Floor area: 28,775 m^{2} (309,730 sq ft) (GFA)
- Lifts/elevators: 3

Design and construction
- Architecture firm: Bates Smart
- Developer: Asian Pacific Group; Golden Age
- Main contractor: Hickory Group

Other information
- Number of rooms: 280
- Parking: 107

Website
- collinshousemelbourne.com.au

Collins House Melbourne is a private residential high-rise building, located at 464-466 Collins Street, in the city centre of Melbourne, in Victoria, Australia.

It should not be confused with the original Collins House, which stood at a different site—360-366 Collins Street, Melbourne—from 1911 until 1974, and was associated with the Collins House Group.

== History ==
The project was developed by both the Asian Pacific Group and Golden Age and designed by architectural firm Bates Smart. Launched in 2013, the project received approval by the then-Planning Minister Matthew Guy in February 2014 as part of a "Super Tuesday", whereby five skyscrapers were approved. With a width of 11.8 metres (39 feet) at its narrowest, Collins House has been designed as one of the world's slimmest skyscrapers and has been referred to as a "pencil skyscraper" or "pencil tower". The development comprises approximately 280 residential apartments across 56 levels, and reaches a height of 190 metres (620 ft).

Construction on Collins House commenced in February 2016, and it was completed in 2019.

As of 2026, Collins House is the 35th-tallest building in Melbourne and 70th-tallest in Australia.
