= Roseland Ballroom =

Former multi-purpose hall in New York City

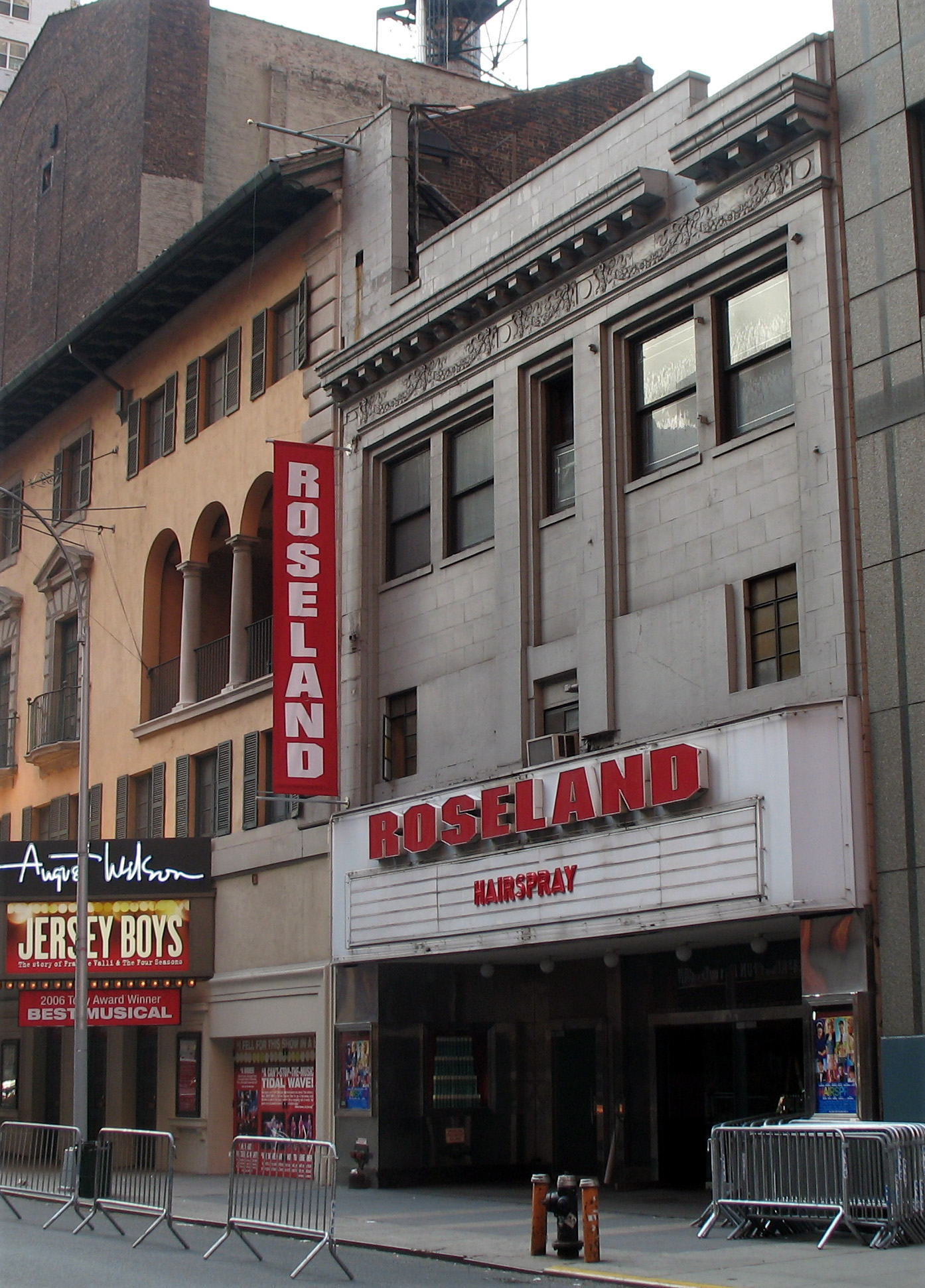
- Roseland Ballroom in July 2007
- Interactive map of Roseland Ballroom
- Address: 239 West 52nd Street
- Location: Manhattan, New York City, U.S.
- Coordinates: 40.763627°N 73.984122°W
- Owner: Ginsberg family (concerts promoted by Live Nation)
- Capacity: 3,200

Construction
- Built: 1922
- Closed: April 7, 2014
- Demolished: 2014
- Cost: $800,000

The Roseland Ballroom was a multipurpose hall, in a converted ice skating rink, with a colorful ballroom dancing pedigree, in New York City's theater district, on West 52nd Street in Manhattan.

The venue, according to its website, accommodated 3,200 standing (with an additional 300 upstairs), 2,500 for a dance party, between 1,300 and 1,500 in theatre style, 800–1,000 for a sit-down dinner, and 1,500 for a buffet and dancing.

The venue hosted a wide range of events, from a Hillary Clinton birthday party, to annual gay circuit parties, to movie premieres, to musical performances of all genres, including Beyoncé's Elements of 4 show and internet stars Team StarKid's Apocalyptour National Concert Tour. It was also known as the place American singer Fiona Apple broke down during a concert in 2000.

The rear of the venue faced West 53rd Street and the Ed Sullivan Theater.

On October 18, 2013, it was announced that the venue would close on April 7, 2014. Lady Gaga completed a short residency as the last performer before the Roseland Ballroom closed.

== History ==
=== Broadway at 51st Street location ===
Roseland was founded initially in Philadelphia, Pennsylvania, in 1917 by Louis Brecker with financing by Frank Yuengling of the D. G. Yuengling & Son beer family.

In 1919, to escape Philadelphia's blue laws, Brecker and Yuengling moved the venue to 1658 Broadway at 51st Street in Manhattan, on the second floor of that five-story building, opening on December 31, 1919. Guests lined up to rub elbows with celebrities like Will Rogers and Florenz Ziegfeld. It was a segregated dance club called the "home of refined dancing," famed for the "society orchestra" groups that played there, starting with Sam Lanin and his Ipana Troubadours.

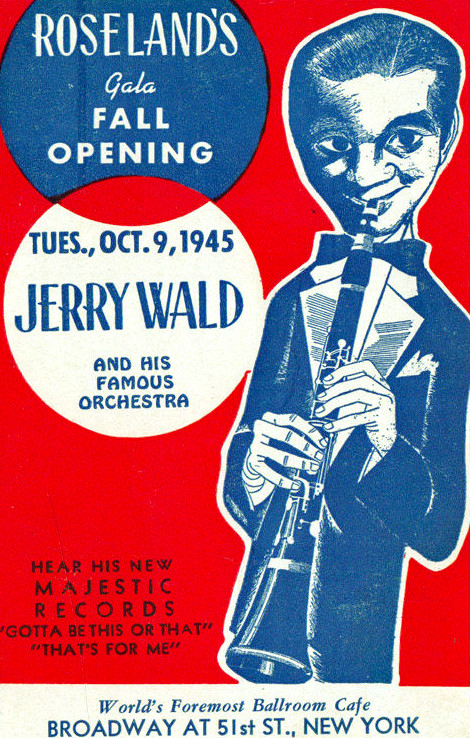
Postcard promoting the club's "Fall Opening" of October 9, 1945

The all-white, ballroom-dancing atmosphere of the club gradually changed with the ascendance in popularity of hot jazz, as played by African American bands on the New York nightclub scene. Piron's New Orleans Jazz Orchestra played the ballroom in 1924. Often, two or more orchestras alternated with one another in order to have continuous dance music. The Fletcher Henderson band played at Roseland in the 1920s and 1930s. Luis Russell, Louis Armstrong, Count Basie (with his "Roseland Shuffle"), and Chick Webb followed with their orchestras. Other major-name bandleaders who played the venue included Vincent Lopez, Harry James, Tommy Dorsey, Glenn Miller and Sonny Burke. Many big-band performances were broadcast live from Roseland by radio networks; recordings survive of several NBC broadcasts of 1940, featuring the young Ella Fitzgerald fronting the Chick Webb band.

Brecker popularized such stunts as marathon dancing (until it was banned), staged female prizefights, yo-yo exhibitions, sneezing contests, and dozens of highly publicized jazz weddings with couples who met at the club.

As the club grew older, Brecker attempted to formalize the dancing more by having hostesses dance for a fee, with tuxedoed bouncers (politely known as "housemen") keeping order.

=== 52nd Street location ===
The original New York Roseland was torn down in 1956 and it moved to its new venue on West 52nd, a building that Brecker earlier had converted from an ice-skating rink to a roller skating rink. It had been built in 1922 at a cost of $800,000 by the Iceland ice-skating franchise. A thousand skaters showed up on opening night at the 80-by-200-foot rink on November 29, 1922. Iceland went bankrupt in 1932 and the rink opened as the Gay Blades Ice Rink. Brecker took it over in the 1950s and converted it to roller skating.

Time magazine described the new Roseland's opening interior as a "purple-and-cerise tentlike décor that creates a definite harem effect." Brecker attempted to maintain its ballroom dancing style, banning rock and roll and, later, disco. In 1974 Brecker told The New York Times, "Cheek-to-cheek dancing, that's what this place is all about."

Brecker sold the building in 1981 to Albert Ginsberg. Under the new owners the Roseland began regularly scheduled "disco nights", which gave rise to a period when it was considered a dangerous venue and neighborhood menace. In 1984, a teenager was shot to death on the dance floor. In 1987, a 34 year old Harlem man was fatally shot in the lobby.

In 1990, after Utah tourist Brian Watkins was killed in the subway, four of the eight suspects (members of the FTS gang) were found partying at Roseland. As a result, Roseland discontinued the "disco nights".

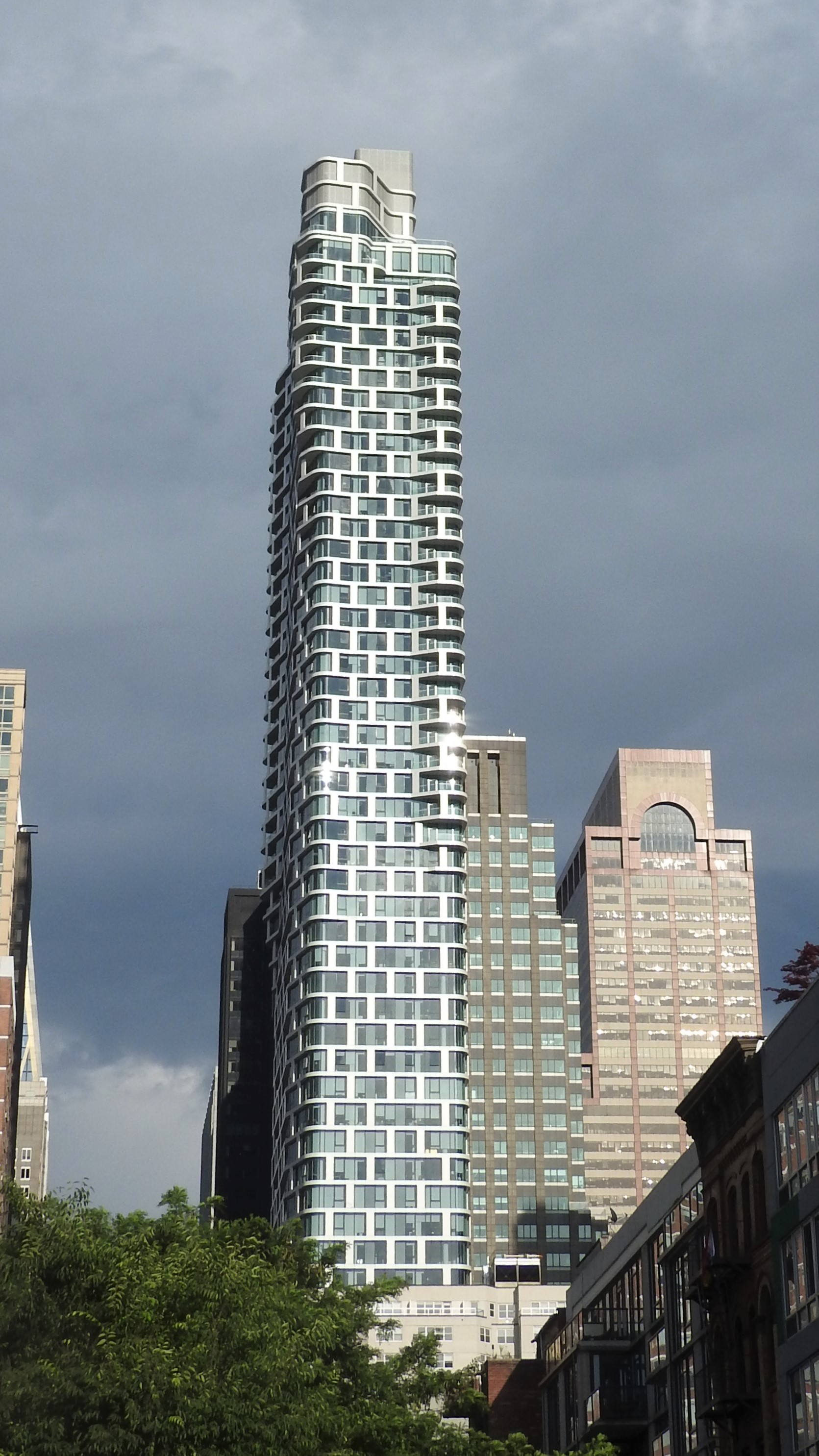
ARO, built on the Roseland site

Roseland's low-rise three-story structure on top of the quarter-acre dance floor in the middle of midtown Manhattan stirred concerns over its being torn down for redevelopment. In 1996, a new owner, Laurence Ginsberg, filed plans to tear down the venue and replace it with a 42-story, 459-unit apartment building. A spokesman for Ginsberg said the filing was to "beat a deadline for new, more stringent earthquake codes, which went into effect earlier" in 1996. The interior space was subsequently renovated. Demolition of the site began in 2014. The site was redeveloped into ARO, a 62-story apartment tower, with retail space built at the former entrance site.

== Closure ==
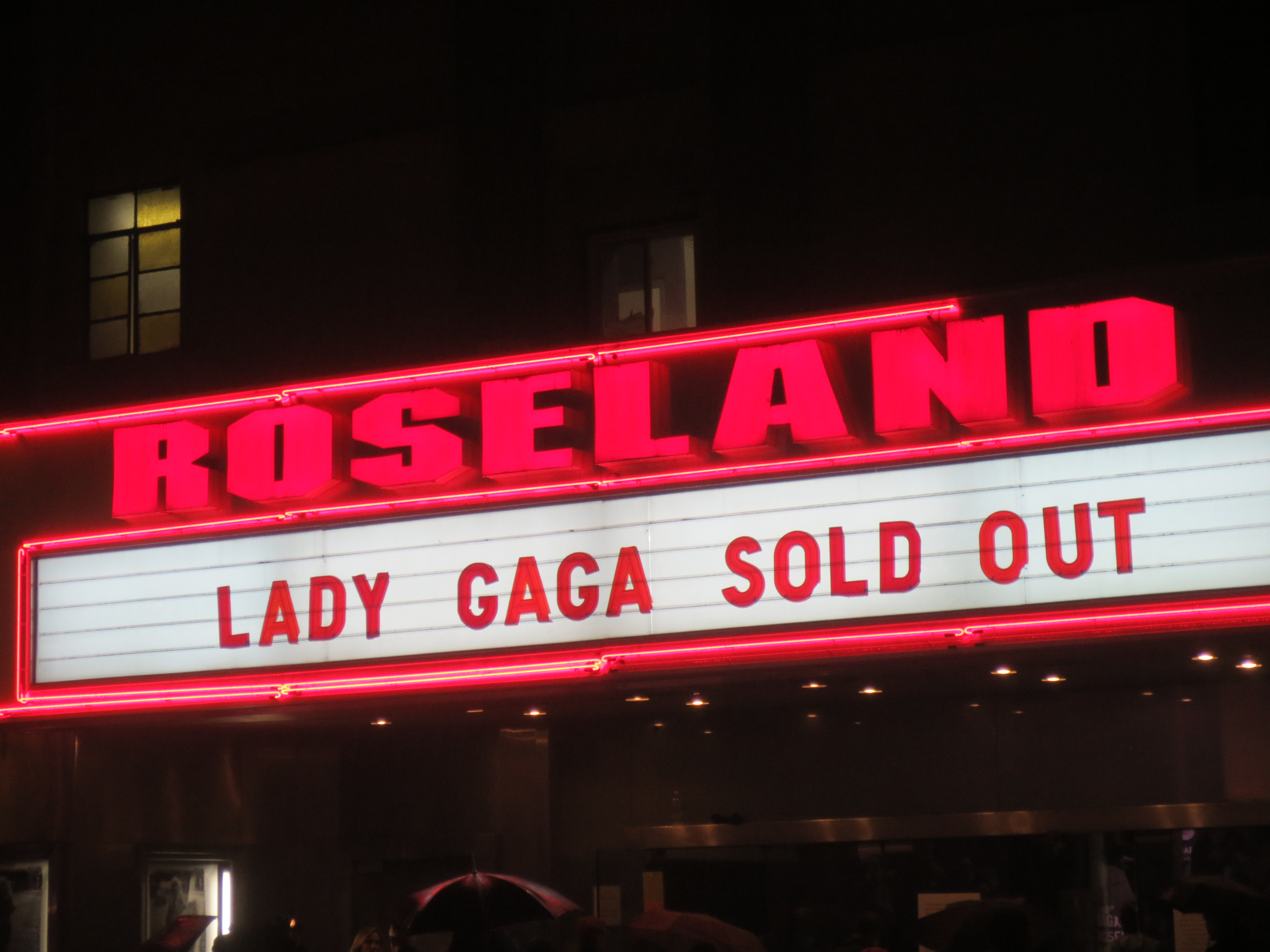
Final Roseland Ballroom marquee

In November 2013, it was announced that Lady Gaga would headline six shows (March 28, 30, 31 and April 2, 4, and 6 of 2014), which would be the final performances at the venue. It was her first time performing there. An extra, seventh show was added, held on April 7, 2014, which officially closed the venue. "G.U.Y." was the final song performed at Roseland Ballroom.

== Notable live recordings, events, and films filmed at the venue ==
=== Movies ===
- Malcolm X directed by Spike Lee has a dance scene at the ballroom.
- Roseland, directed by James Ivory and starring Christopher Walken.

=== Music ===
- Raven along with Anthrax and Metallica on August 3, 1984
- Ella Fitzgerald and her Orchestra on February 26, 1940
- Meltdown, a bootleg of the Nirvana performance at the New Music Seminar on July 23, 1993.
- Blind Melon performed at the Roseland on February 17, 1994. Prince (as 0(+>) performed at the Roseland on December 12, 1994.
- Primus performed at the Roseland on August 4, 1995.
- Ozzy Osbourne performed at the Roseland on October 14, 1995.
- Live footage used in the No Doubt video "Don't Speak" was from an August 21, 1996, performance at the Roseland Ballroom
- Live at Roseland Ballroom, a 1996 live album from Gov't Mule
- Roseland NYC Live, a 1998 live album by Portishead
- Jimmy Page and The Black Crowes performed at the Roseland on October 12, 1999.
- Phish performed at the Roseland on May 23, 2000, for taping of VH1's Hard Rock Live that first aired July 1, 2000.
- Green Day performed their release show for the album Warning, on October 4, 2000.
- Madonna performed her new album, Music in November 2000.
- Shakira performed at the Roseland Ballroom in 2001.
- Live Scenes from New York and Metropolis 2000: Scenes from New York, live album and DVD by Dream Theater (2001)
- Roseland Ballroom 2003, a bootleg recording of a 2003 AC/DC concert.
- Evil or Divine, a 2005 live album and DVD by Heavy Metal artist Dio
- "Abrasions Mount The Timpani", "Take The Veil Cerpin Taxt", "A: Gust Of Mutts" and "B: And Ghosted Pouts" from the live album Scabdates by The Mars Volta (2005)
- Honda Civic Tour presents: Panic! At The Disco on May 8, 2008.
- Madonna: Hard Candy Promo Tour – filmed for MSN online broadcast on April 30, 2008.
- Phil Collins: Going Back – Live at Roseland Ballroom, NYC (2010)
- Beyoncé held a revue show titled 4 Intimate Nights with Beyoncé on August 14, 16, 18 and 19, 2011. The first show sold out in 22 seconds, and the remaining three performances in the following minute. A DVD of the show titled, Live at Roseland: Elements of 4, was released on November 21, 2011.
- Steve Aoki: Deadmeat Live at Roseland Ballroom was recorded in 2012.
- Nicki Minaj held a free concert for her last U.S. date from her Pink Friday Tour August 14, 2012, which was streamed by Pepsi at Roseland.
- Lady Gaga Live at Roseland Ballroom – filmed for Verizon Wireless online broadcast on April 7, 2014, the last day of Lady Gaga's residency concert and also the closing date of Roseland.
- Lamb of God held a concert on October 25, 2013 on their first North American tour after their vocalist, Randy Blythe, was released from prison in the Czech Republic

=== Theatre ===
- In A Chorus Line, the character of Al DeLuca sings about how his father would take his mother to the Roseland Ballroom in the song Montage 3: Mother.

=== Other Events ===
The finals for the national Bakugan tournament series Baku-Con were held at the venue from February 20, 2010 to February 21, 2010.
