= List of Italian brands =

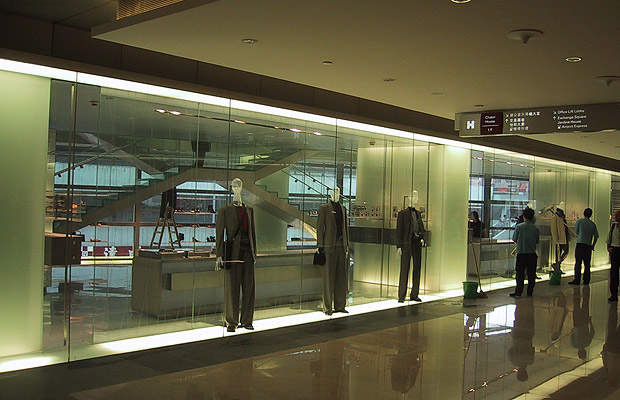
Armani suits at an Armani store in Hong Kong

This is a list of Italian brands, which encompasses brand-name products and services produced by companies in Italy.

== Italian brands ==
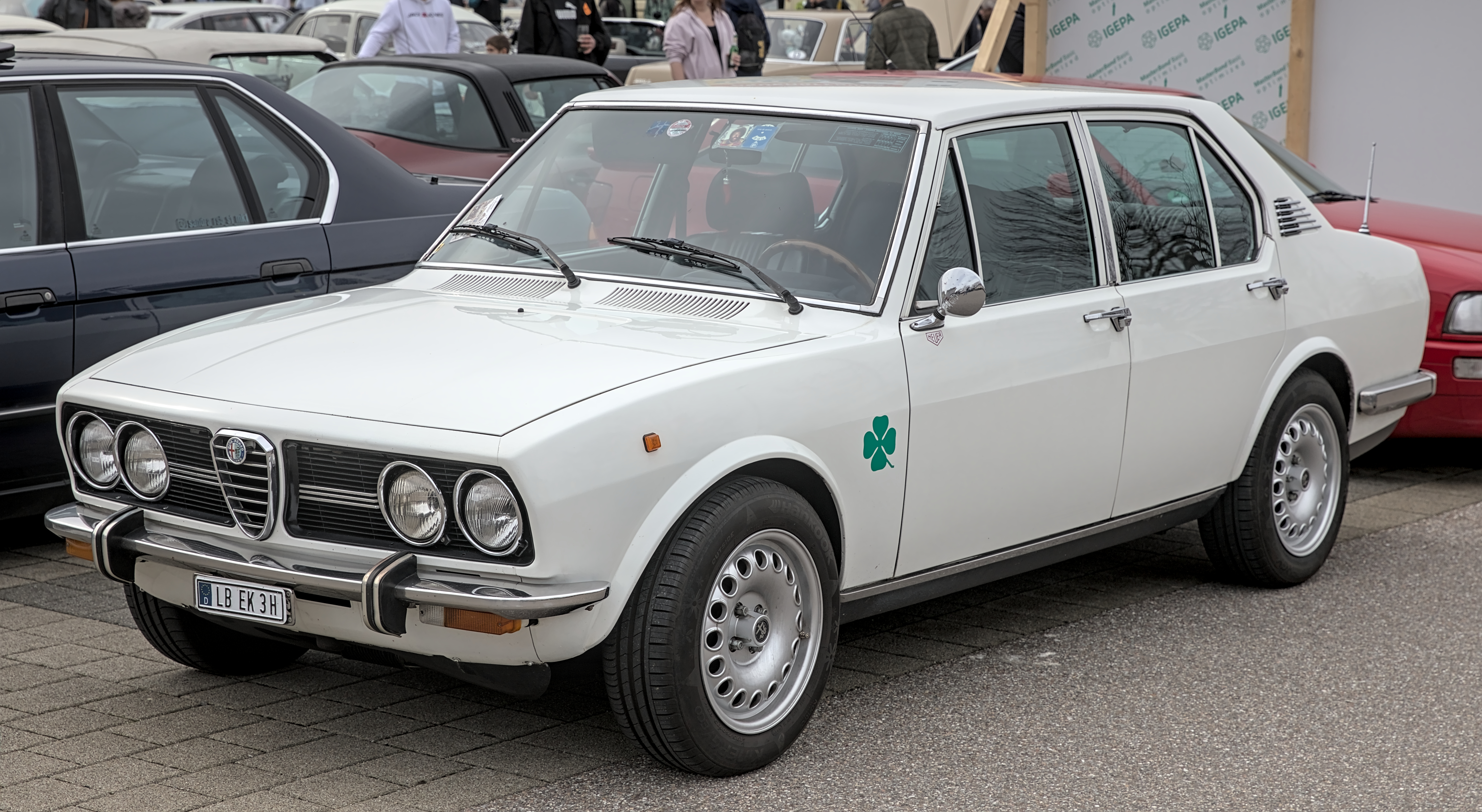
The Alfa Romeo Alfetta, produced from 1972 to 1984

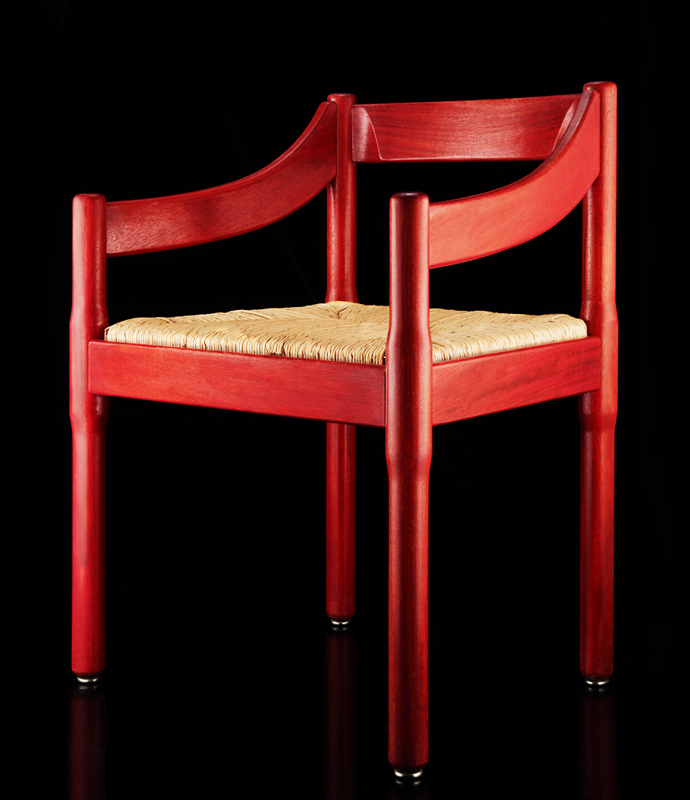
Carimate Chair designed by Vico Magistretti in 1959 and produced by Cassina

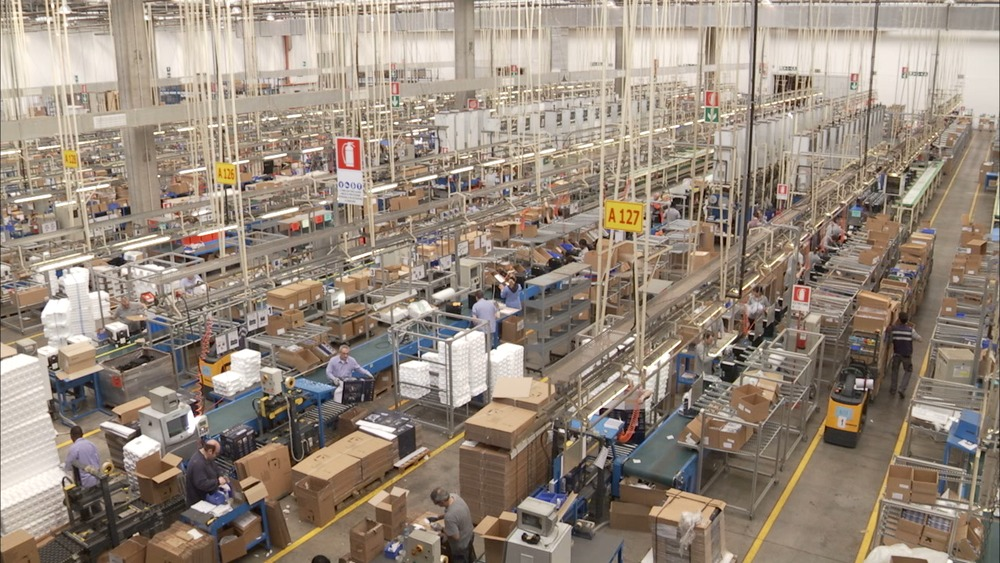
Manufacturing plant for De'Longhi coffee machines in Treviso, Italy

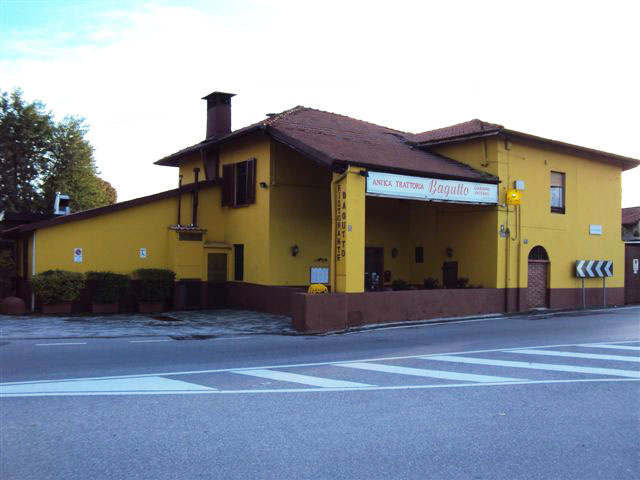
The Antica trattoria Bagutto in Milan, the oldest restaurant in Italy and the second in Europe.

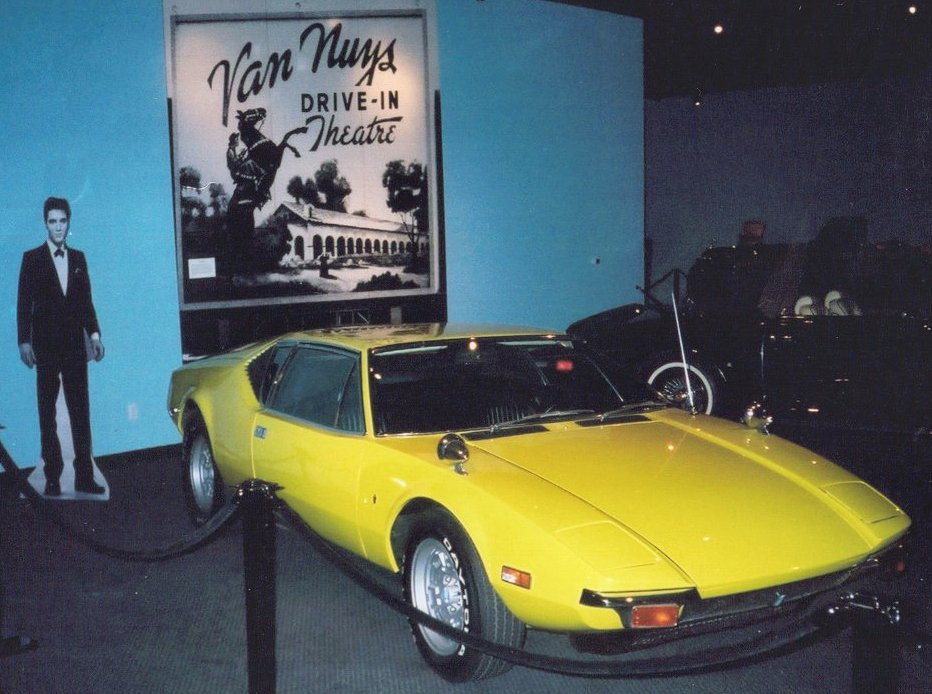
De Tomaso Pantera, once owned by Elvis Presley

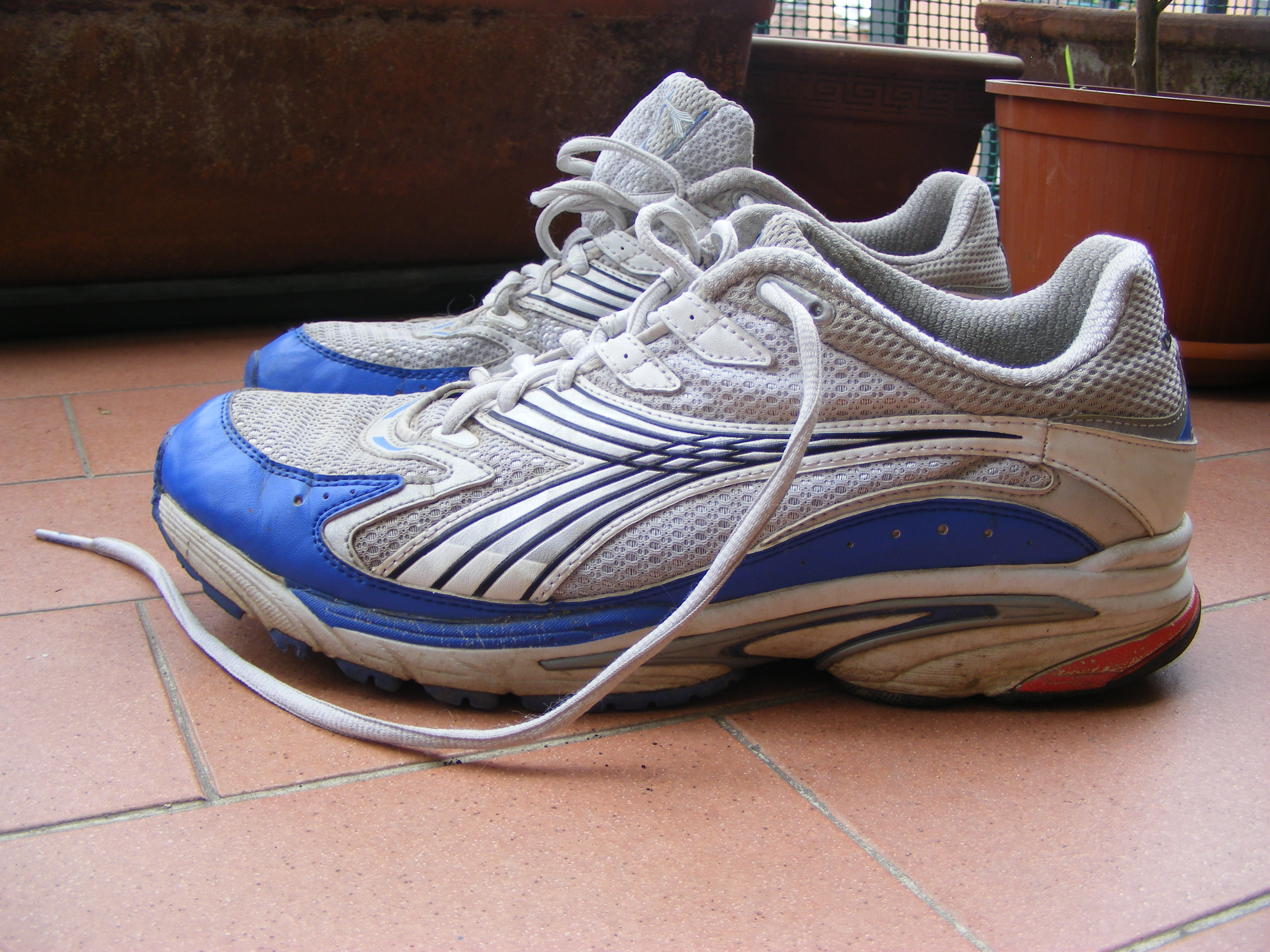
Diadora Mythos Axeler athletic shoes, 2009

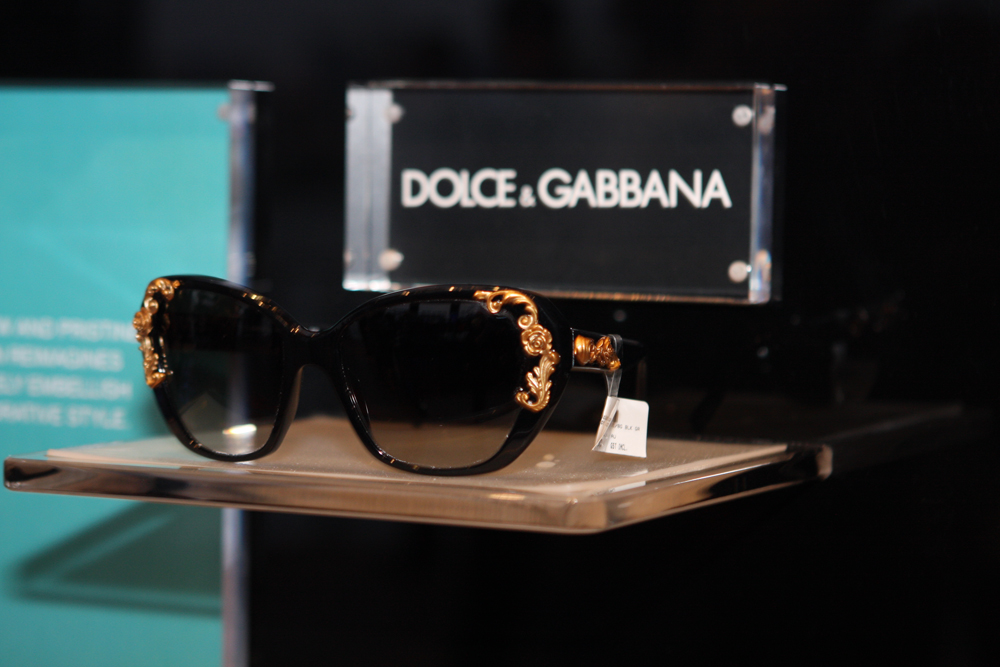
Dolce & Gabbana, headquartered in Milan

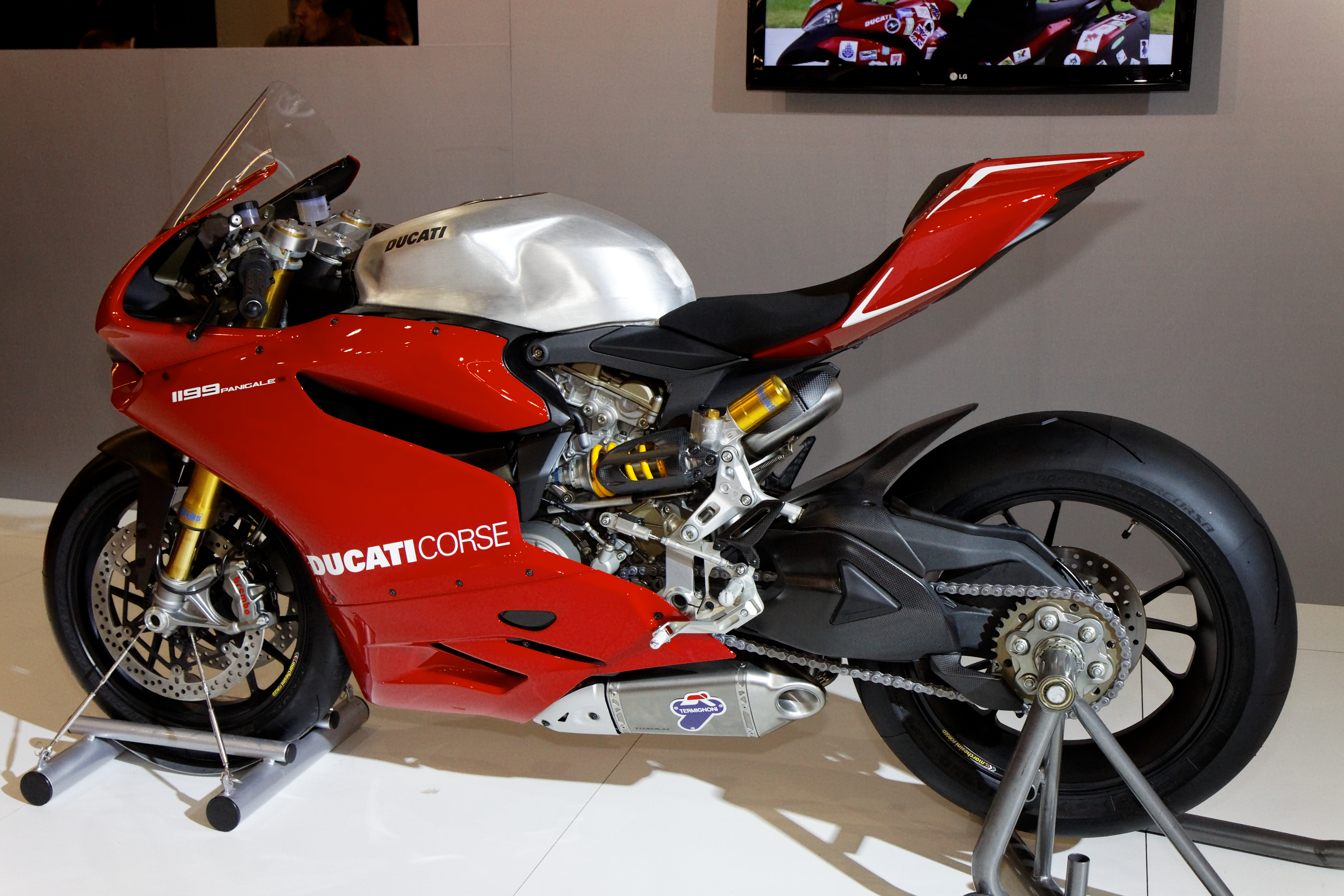
A Ducati 1199 Panigale S motorcycle

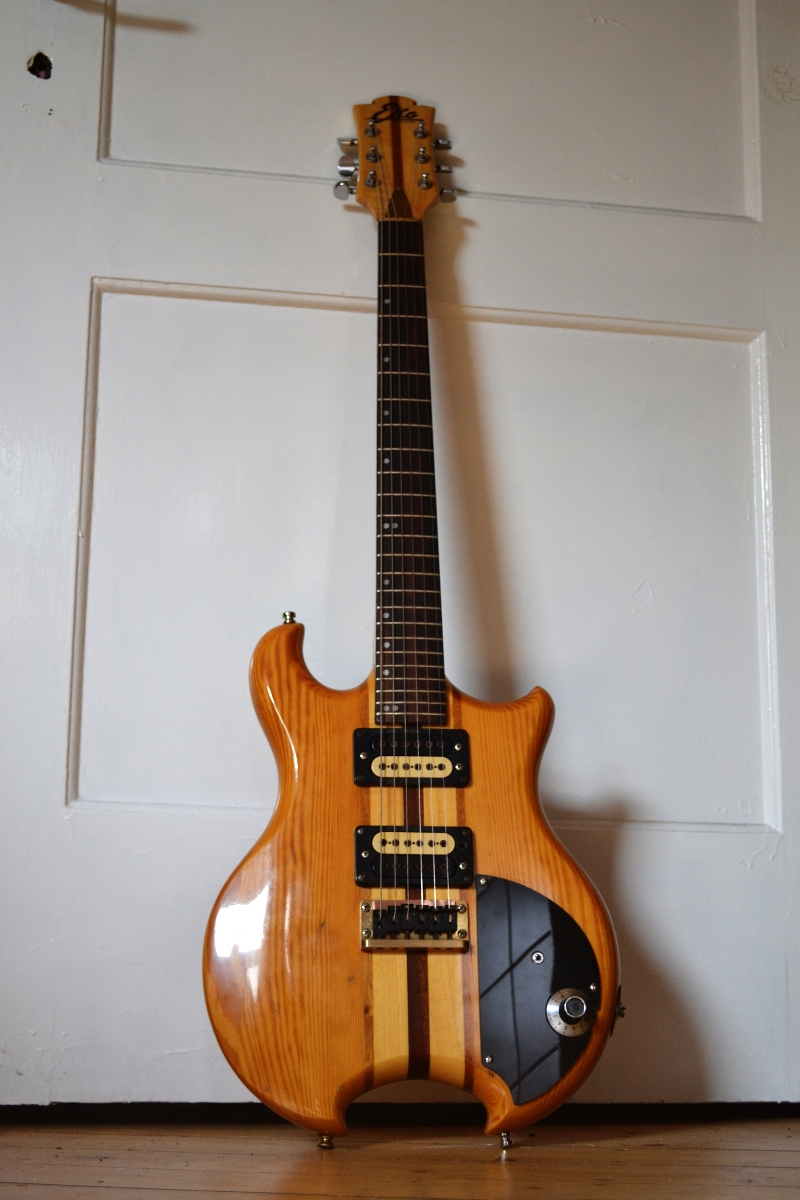
An Eko CX7S guitar

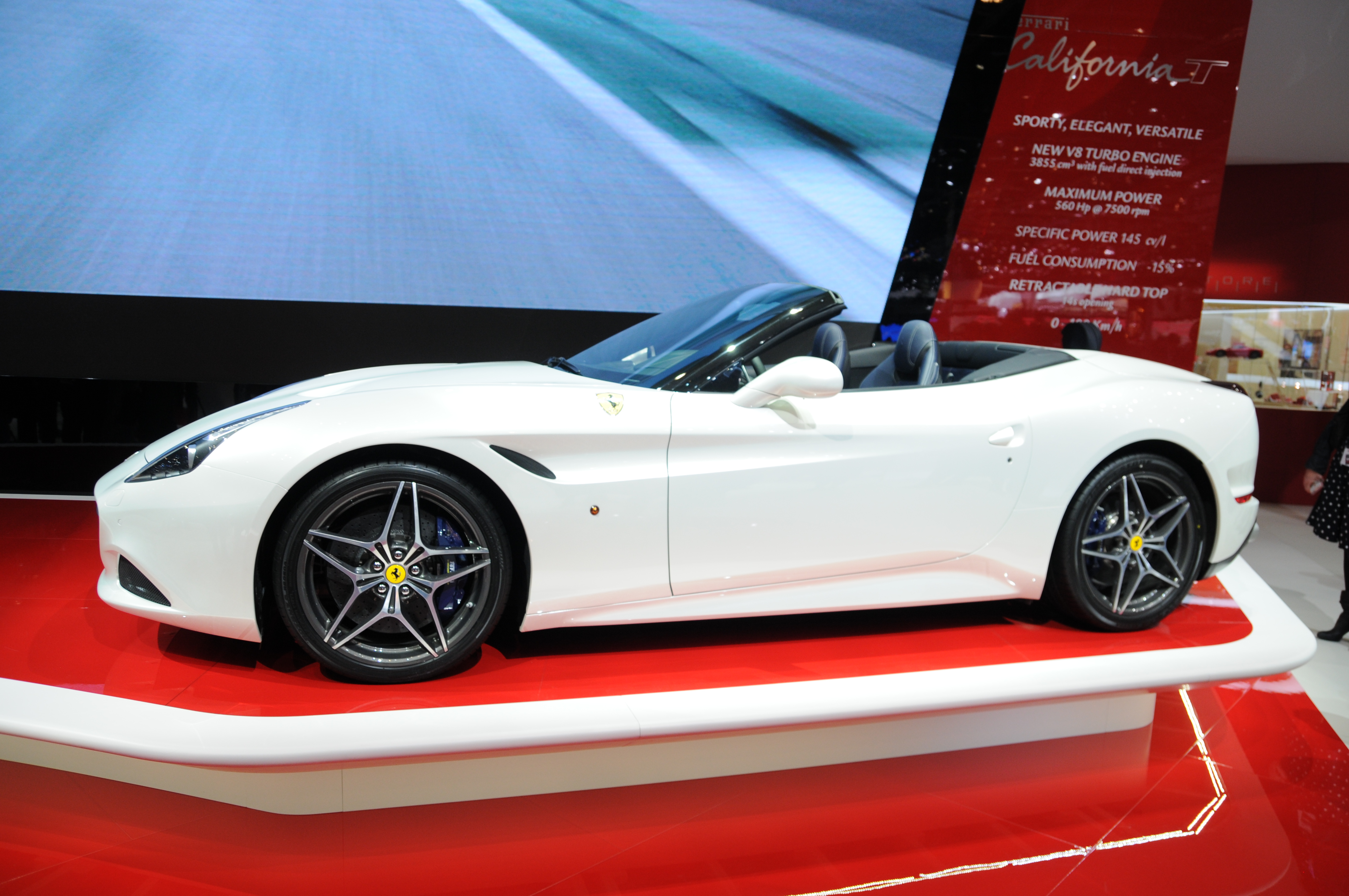
Ferrari California T

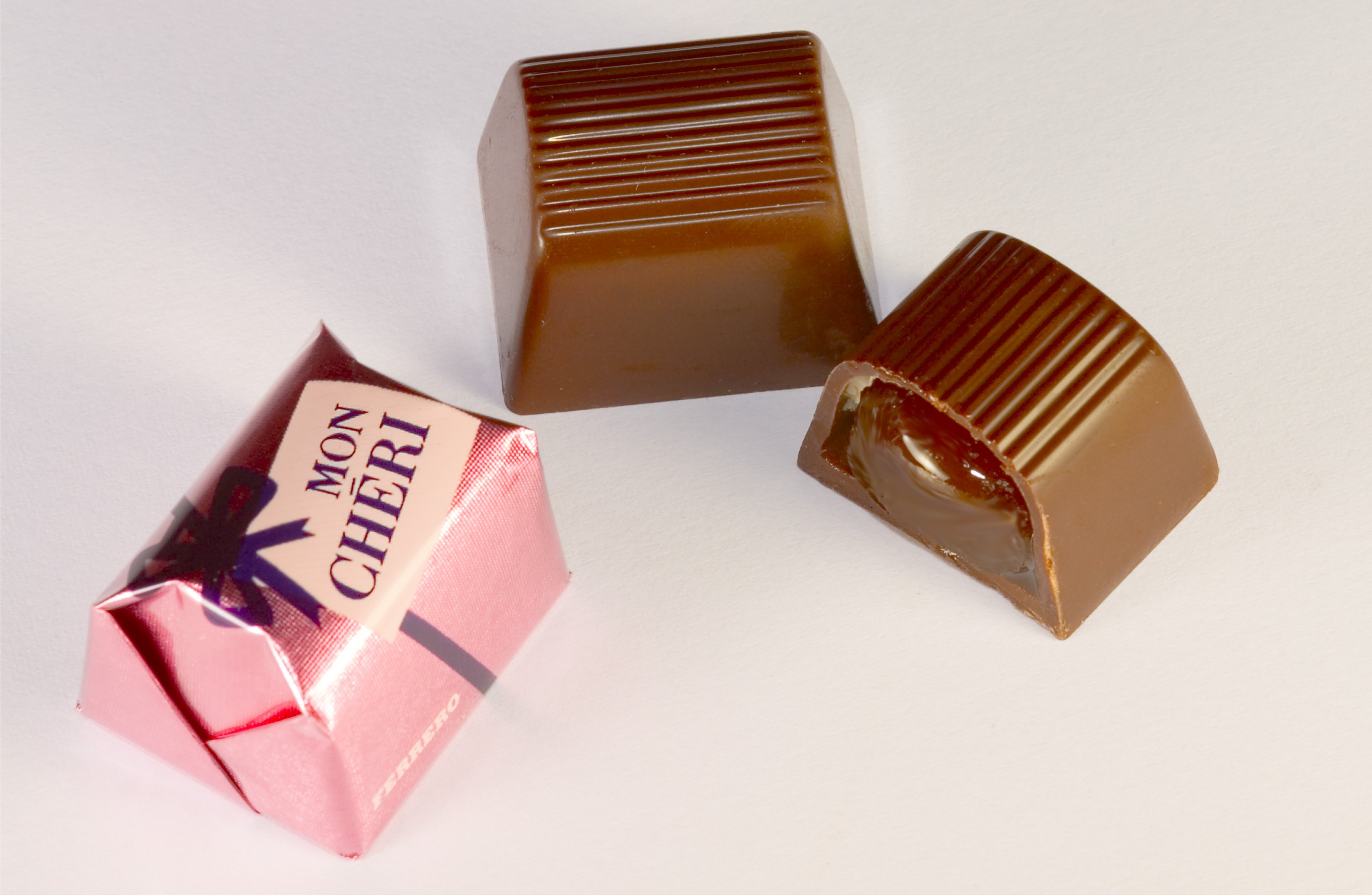
Ferrero Mon Chéri

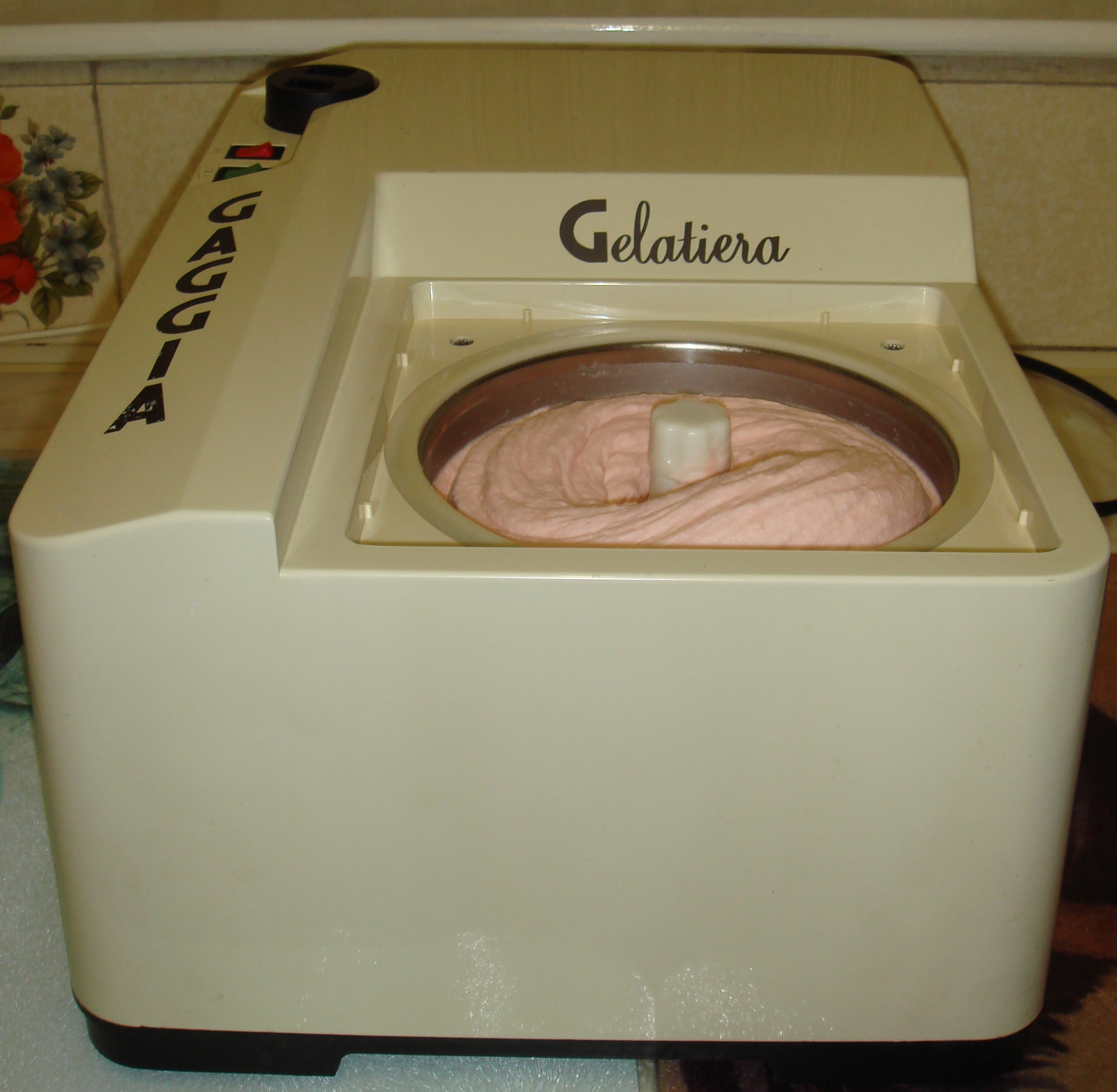
A Gelato maker made by Gaggia

The historical headquarters of Giulio Cocchi Spumanti winery in Asti

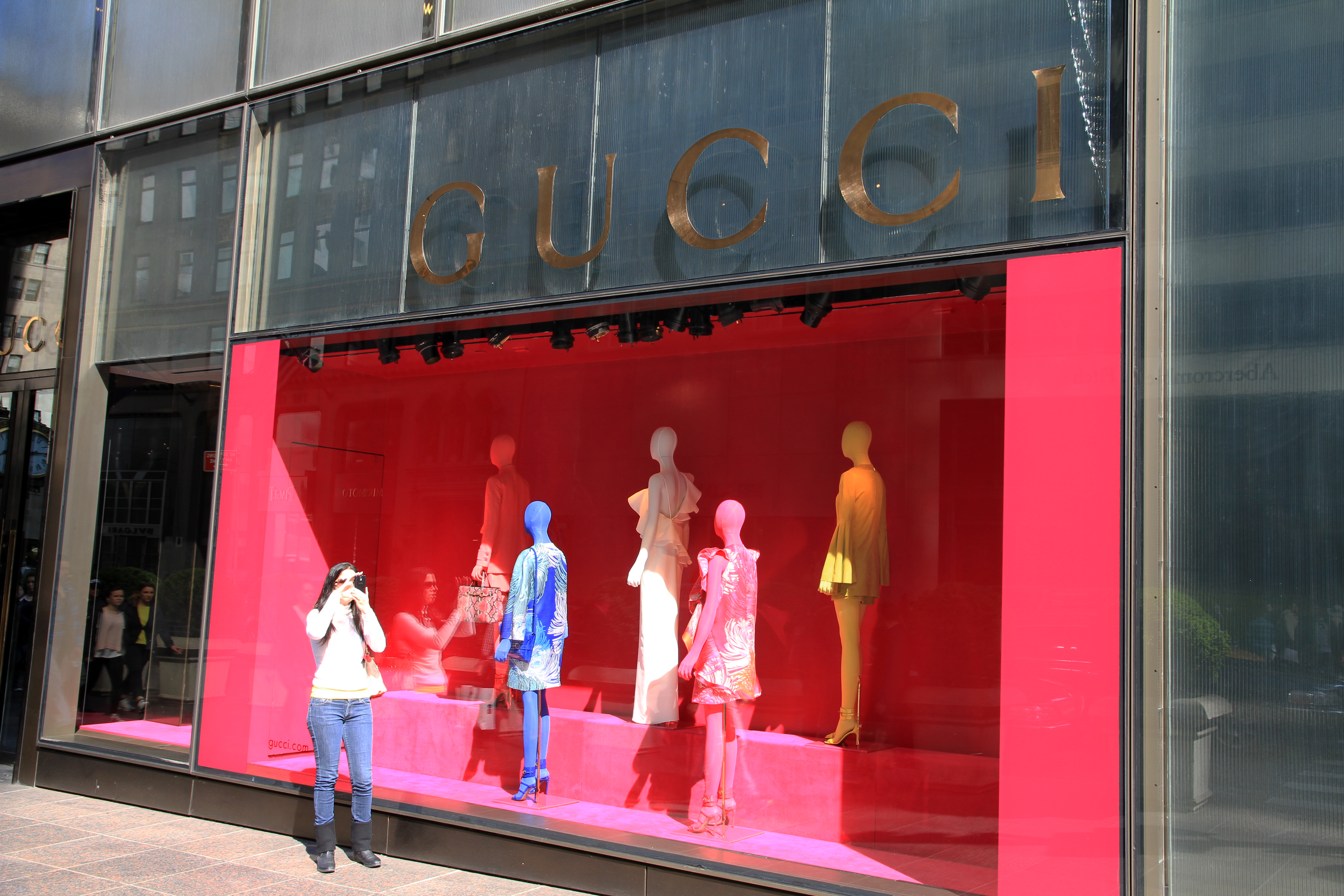
A Gucci store on 5th Avenue in New York City

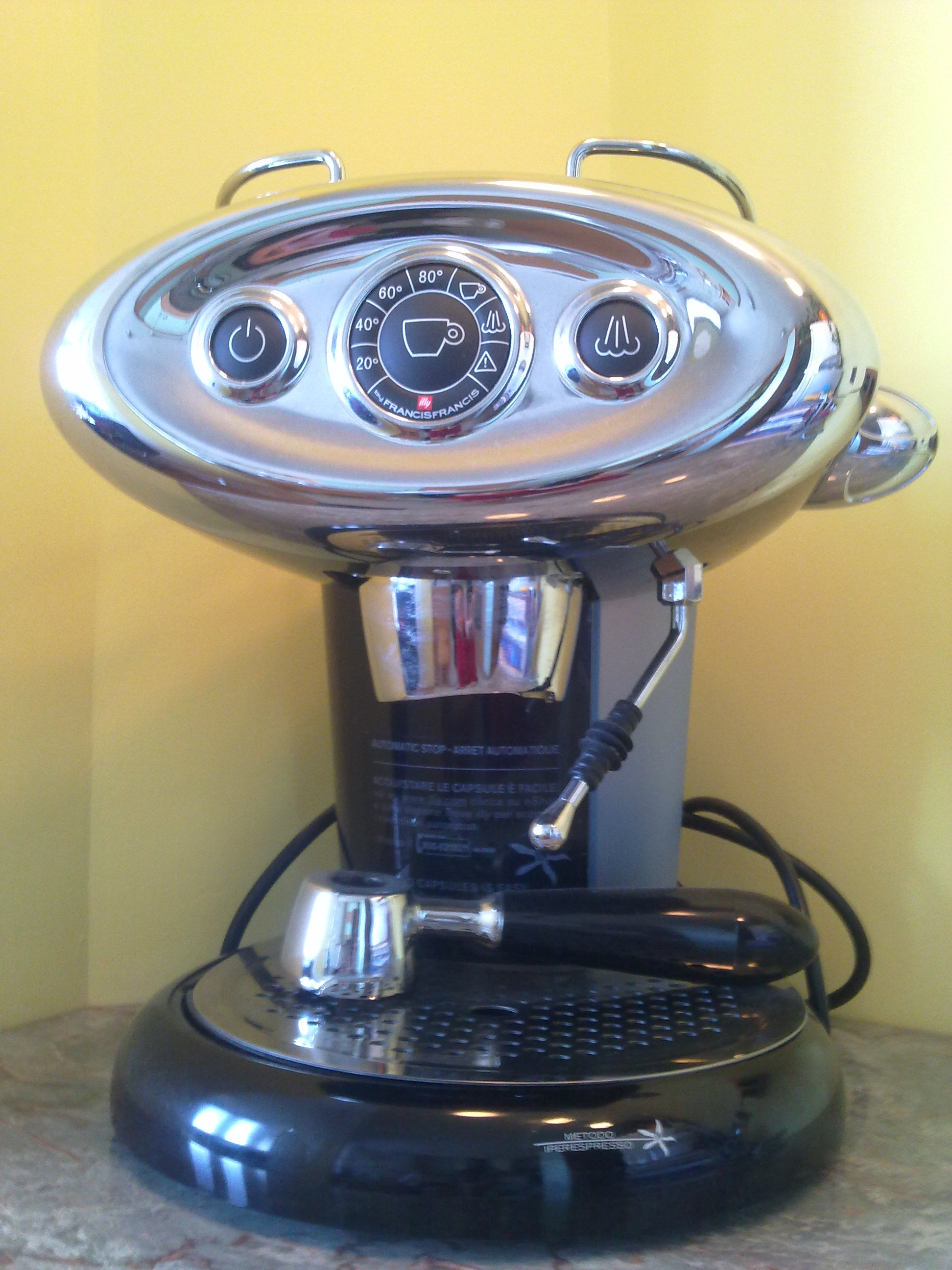
An illy espresso machine

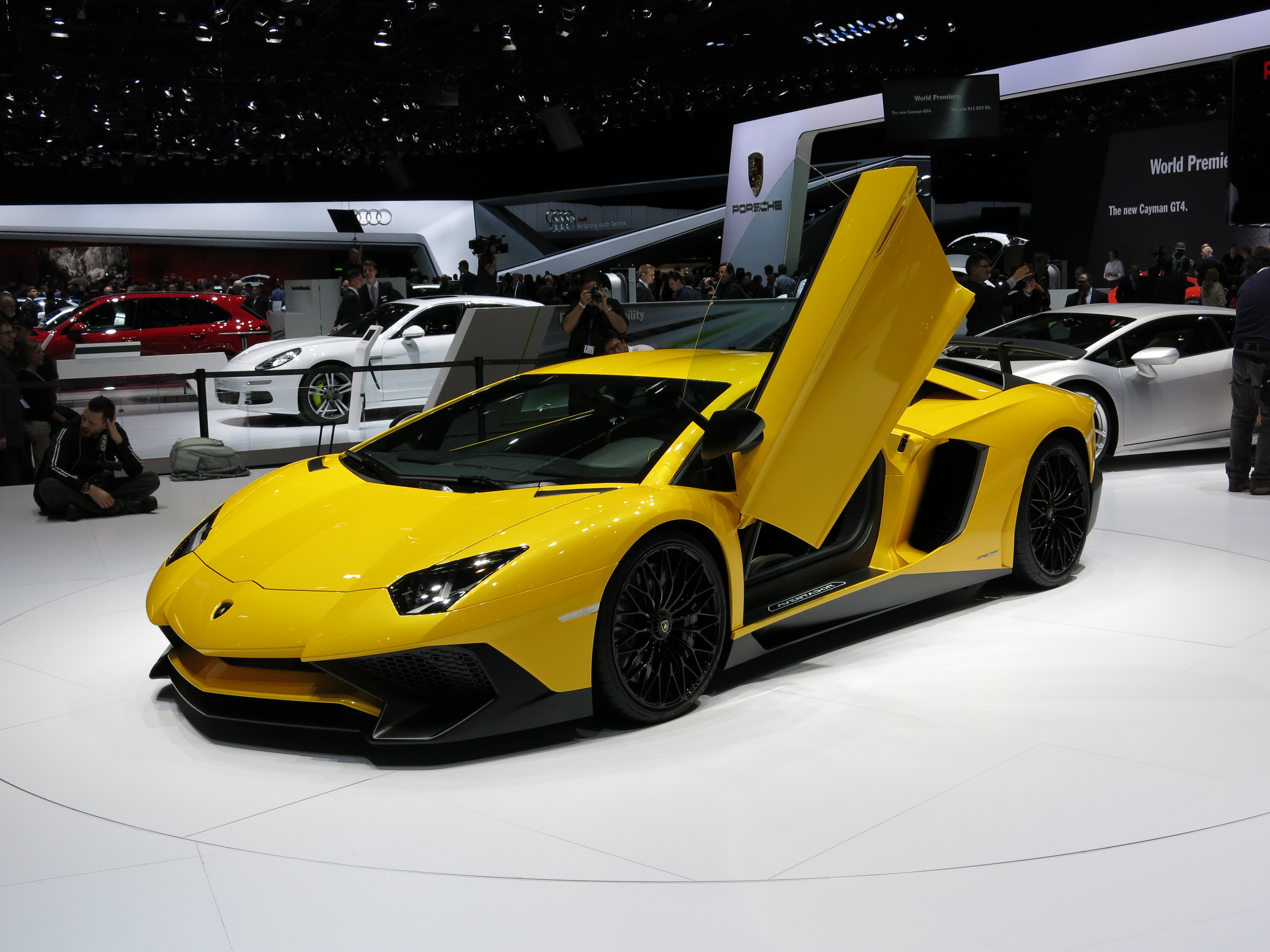
A 2015 Lamborghini Aventador at the 2015 Geneva Motor Show

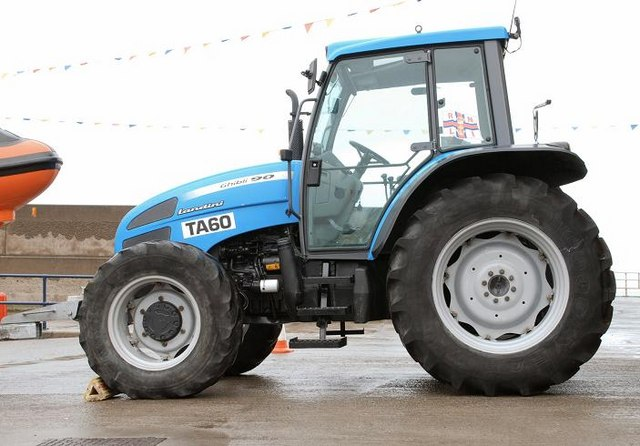
A Landini TA 60 tractor

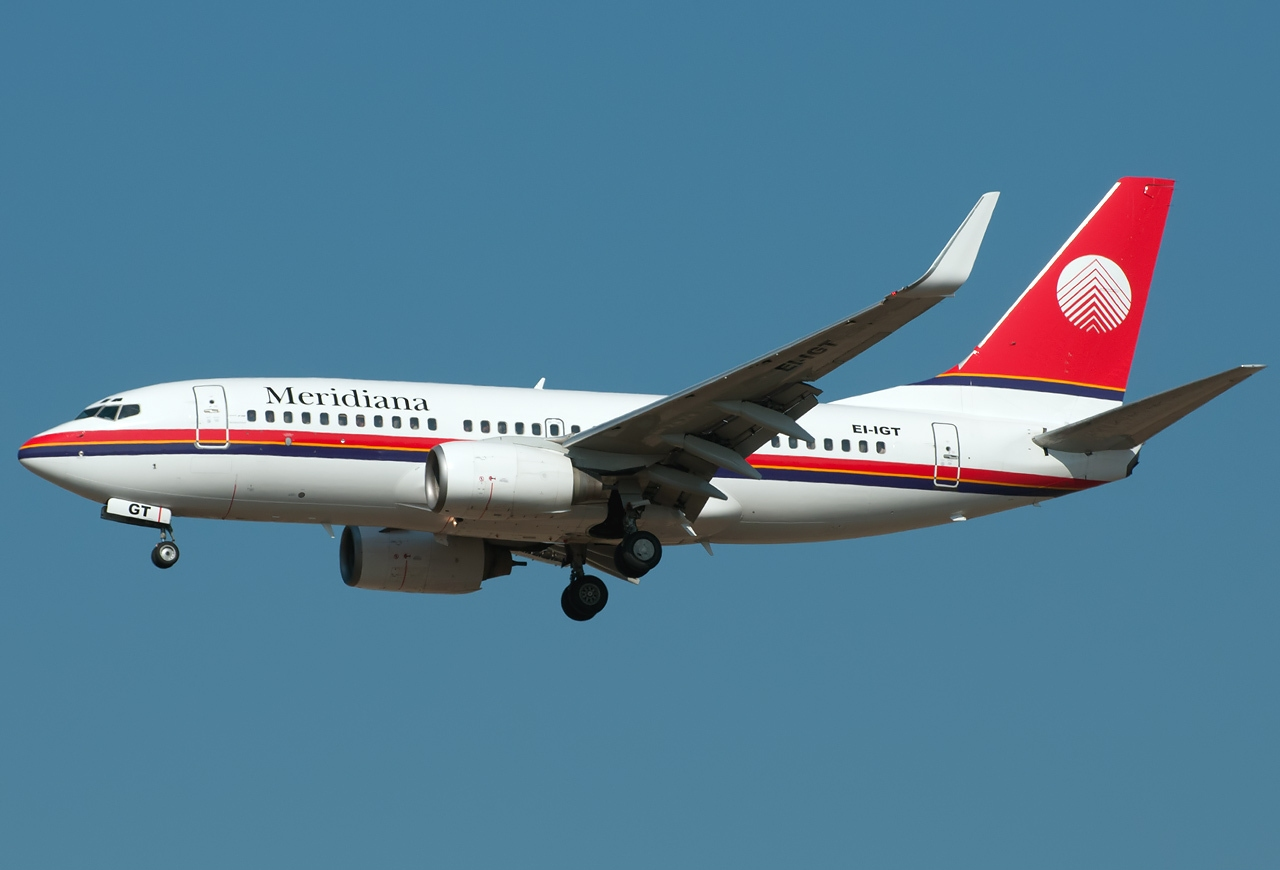
A Meridiana Boeing 737-700

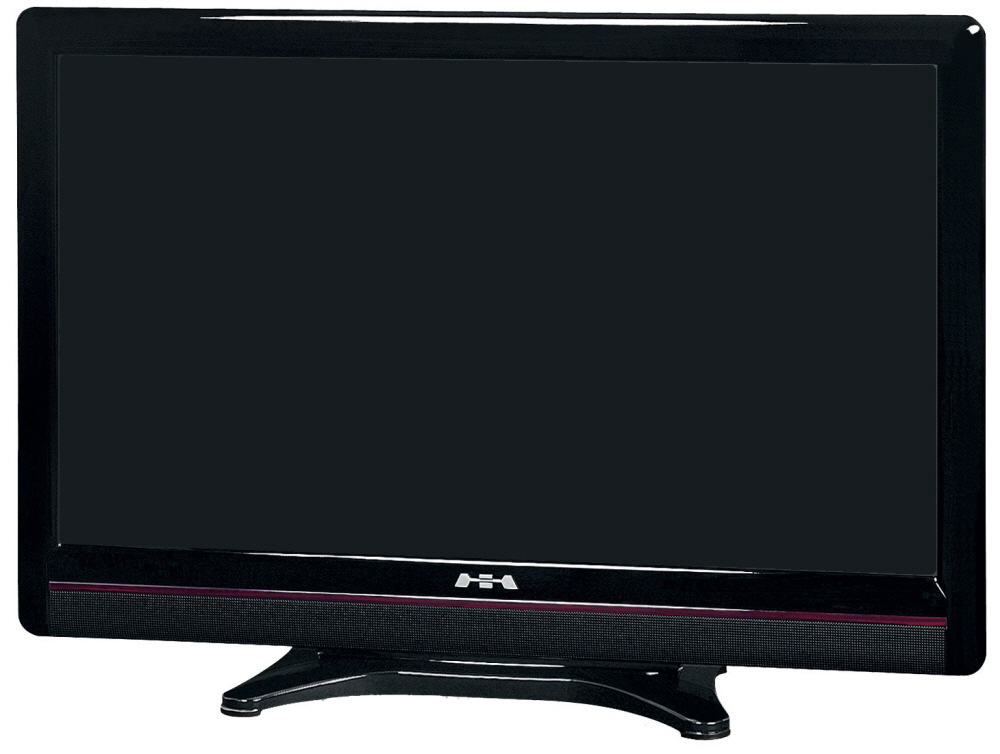
A Mivar 32LED1 100 Hz black television

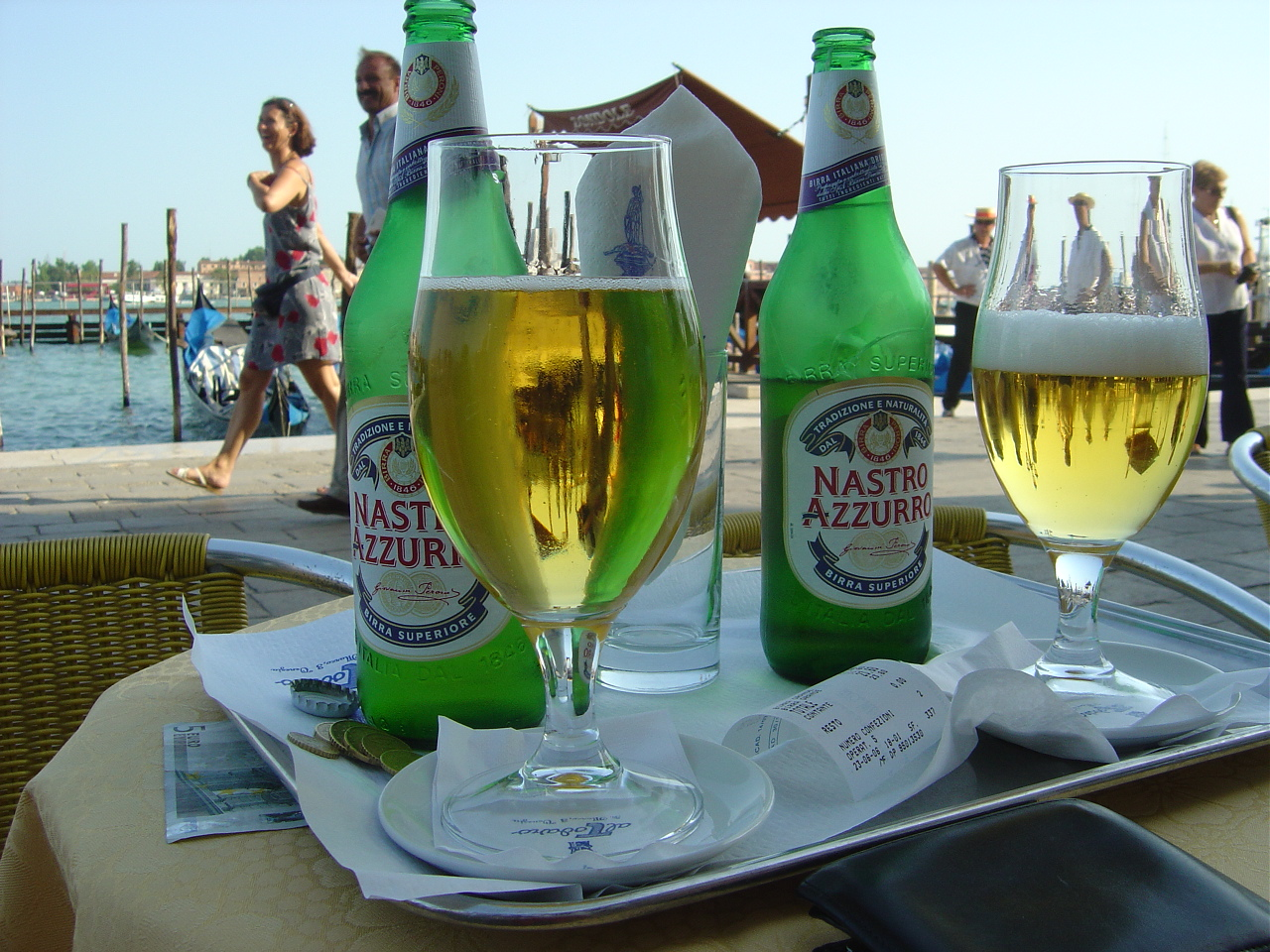
Nastro Azzurro, a brand of beer produced by Peroni Brewery

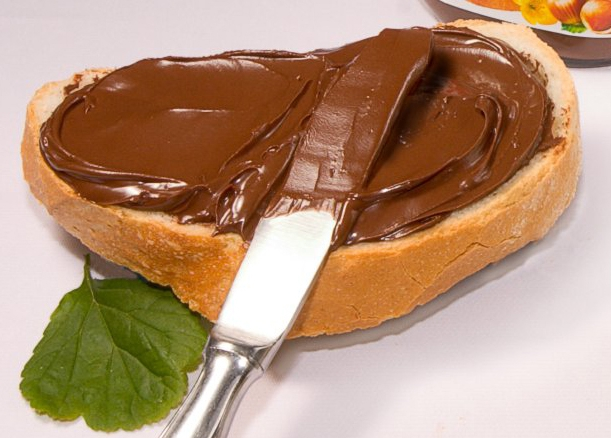
Nutella hazelnut-chocolate spread

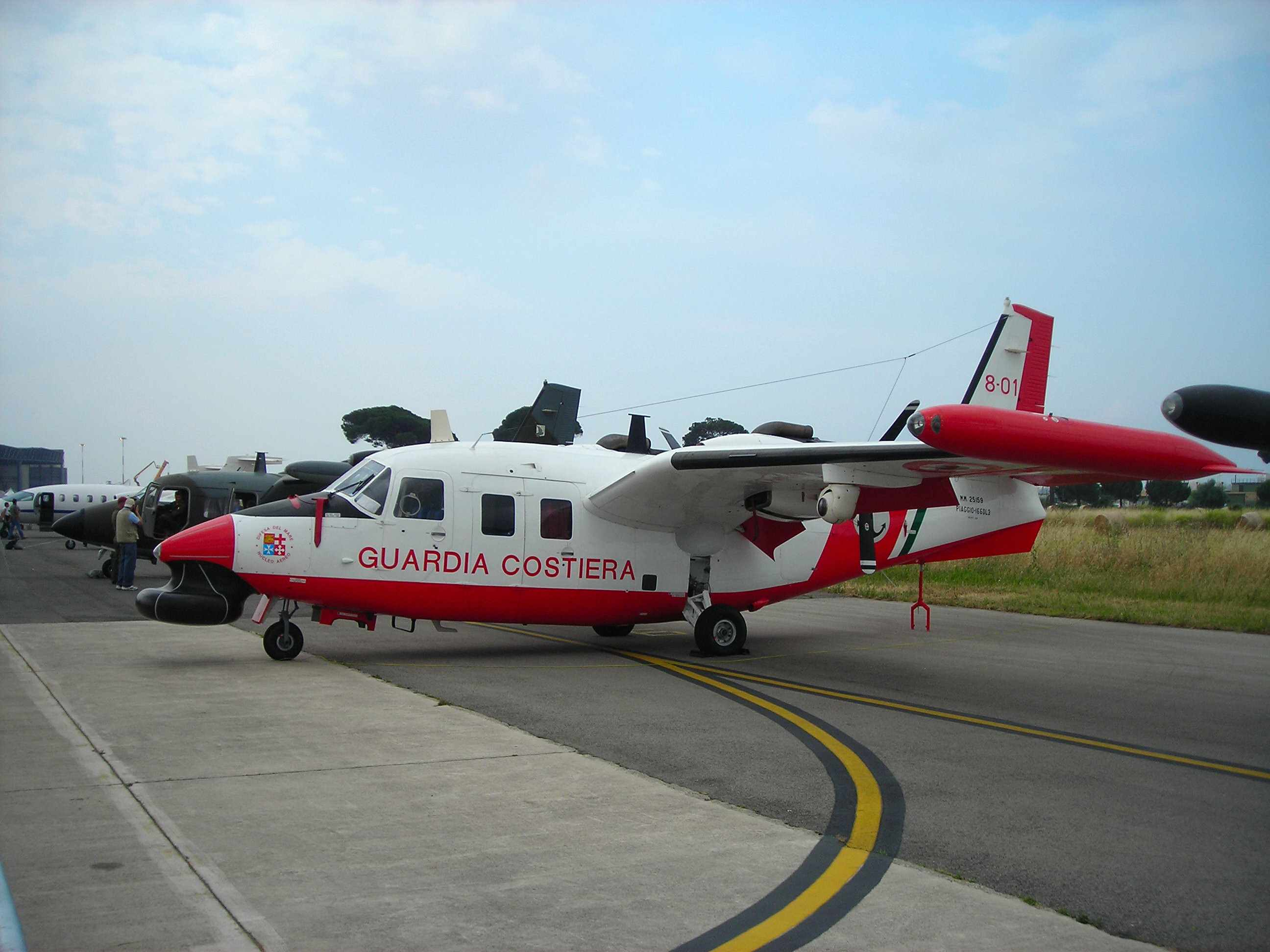
A Piaggio Aerospace P.166 in service with the Italian Coast Guard

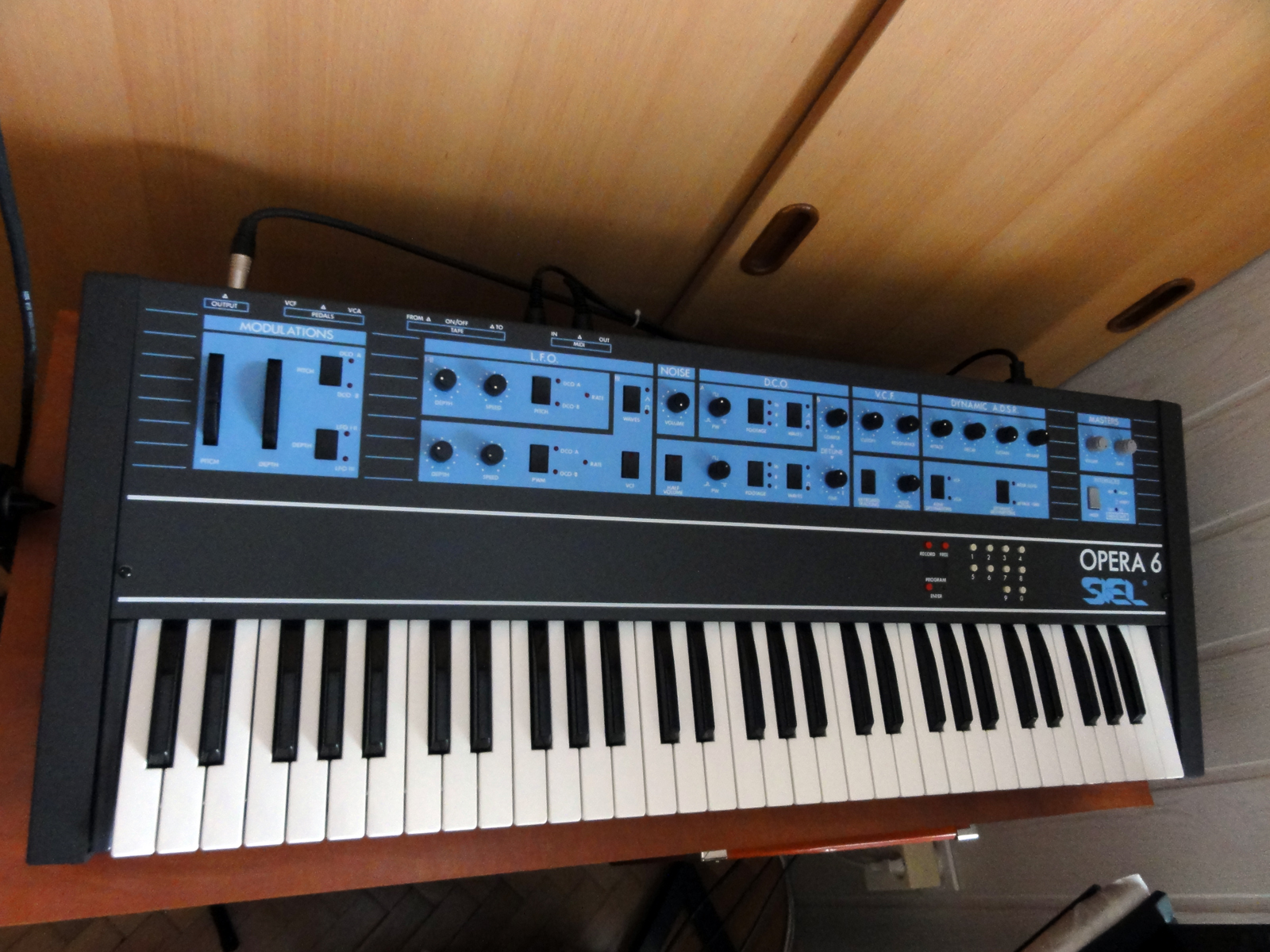
A Siel Opera 6, a 6-voice analog polyphonic synthesizer (1984)

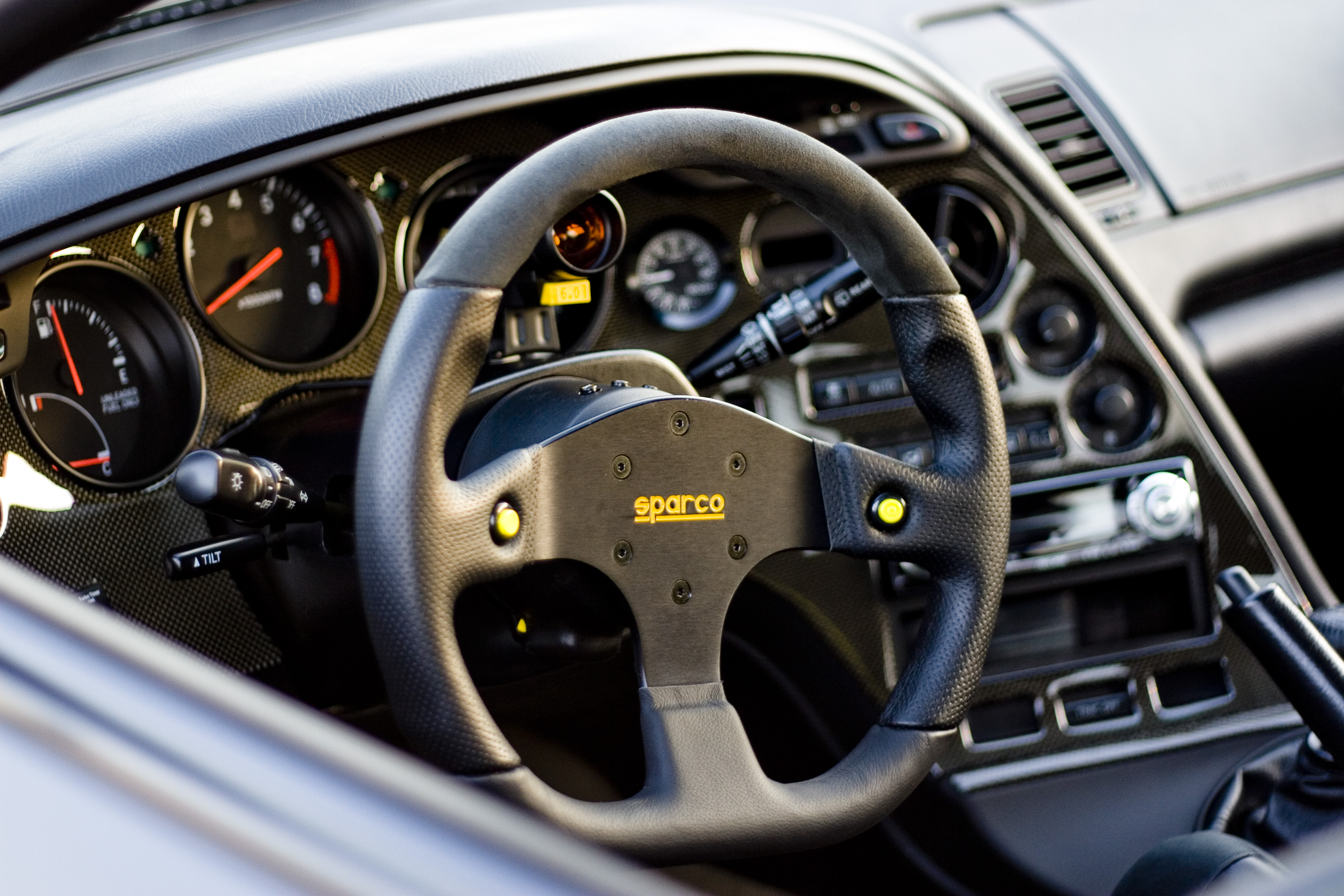
A Sparco steering wheel

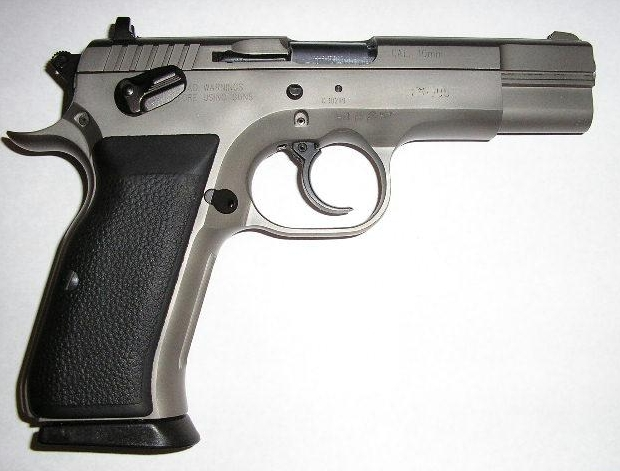
A Tanfoglio T95 Combat pistol

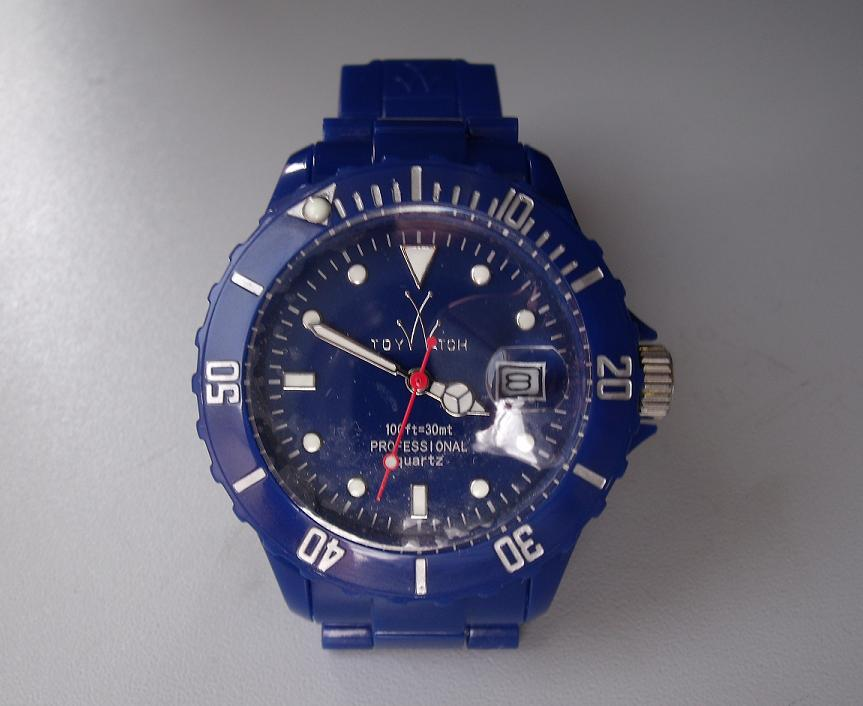
A ToyWatch Fluo Blue

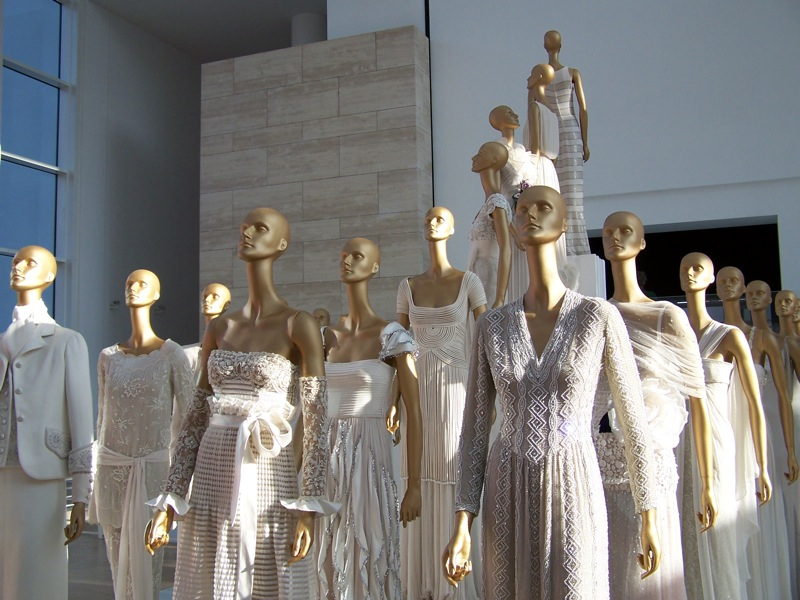
White Valentino dresses in celebration of the company's 45 years in fashion

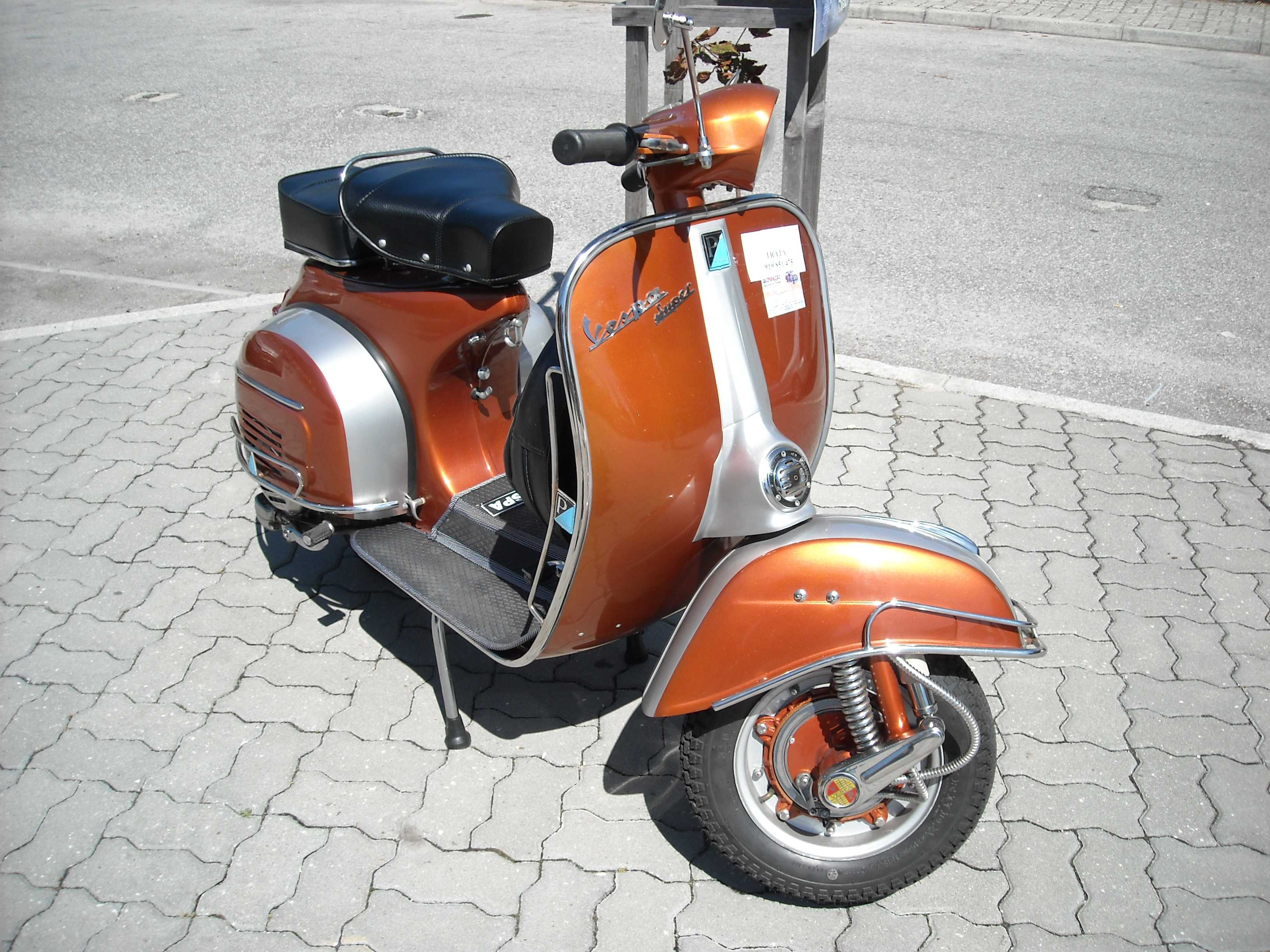
A Vespa scooter

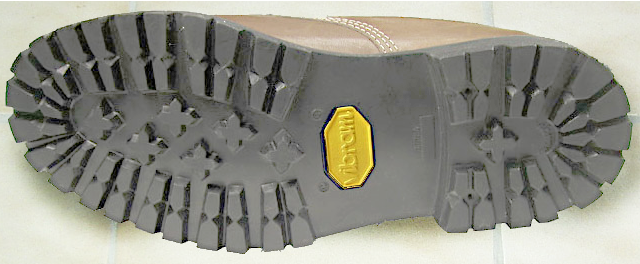
Detail of the original Vibram "Carrarmato" lug shoe sole design with the yellow Vibram emblem

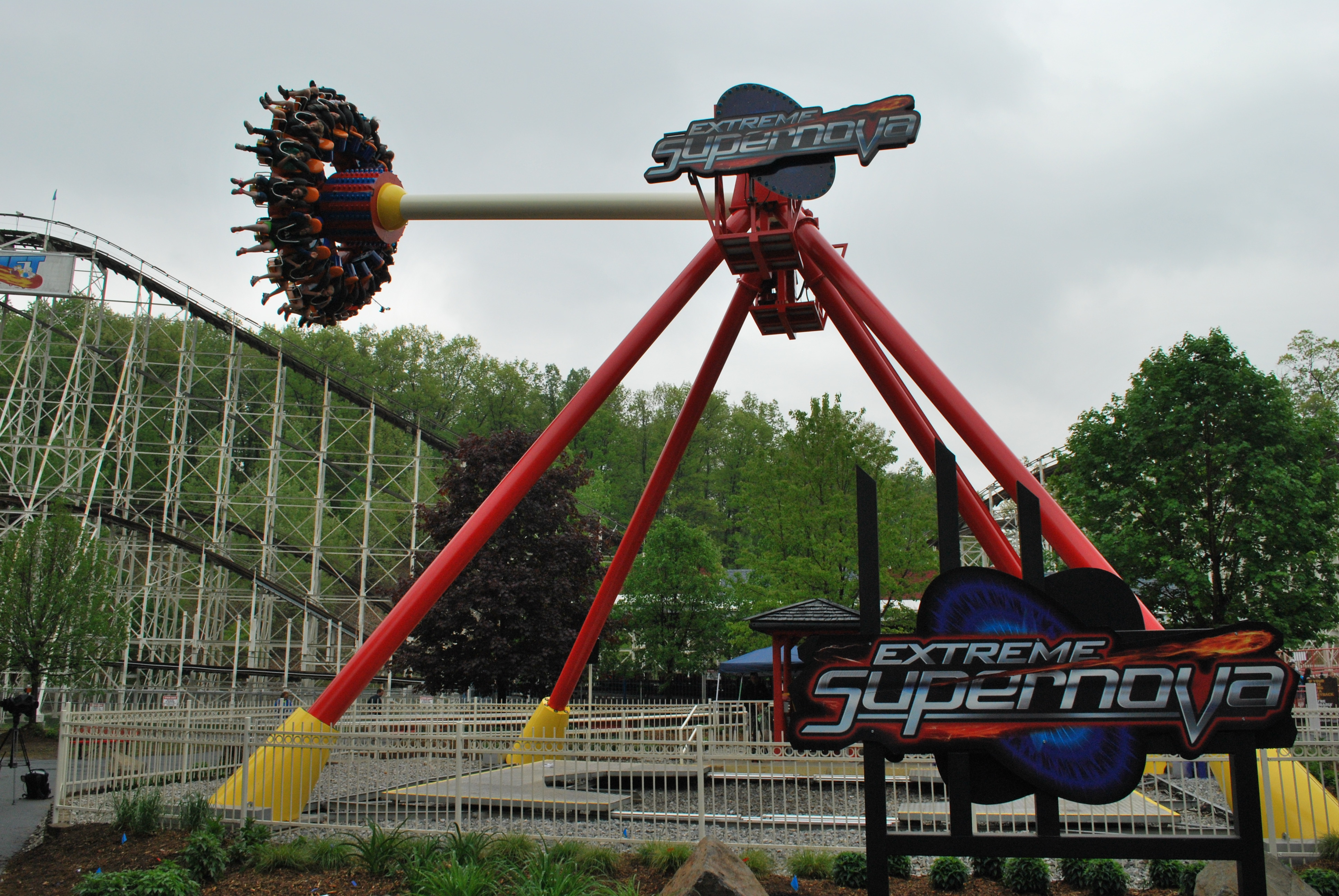
The Extreme Supernova is a relocated Zamperla Midi Discovery thrill ride that was installed at The Great Escape in 2014

== 0-9 ==
- 3

== A ==
- Abarth
- Abici
- Accossato
- Acqua di Parma
- Acqua Minerale San Benedetto
- Aeritalia
- Aermacchi
- Agip
- Agusta
- AgustaWestland
- AGV (helmets)
- ALAN
- Alenia Aermacchi
- Alenia Aeronautica
- Alessi
- Alfa Romeo
- Alitalia
- Amarcord Brewery
- Amedei
- Amedei Porcelana
- Angelini
- Ansaldi
- Antica trattoria Bagutto
- Michele Ansaldi
- Ansaldo Energia
- Ansaldo STS
- AnsaldoBreda
- API
- Aprilia
- Aquila Italiana
- ARGO
- Ariston Thermo
- Armani
- Armi Jager
- Arrow (motorcycle parts)
- Artemide
- Assicurazioni Generali
- Astra
- Atala
- Atlantic
- Audio Analogue
- Audison
- Aurea (cars)
- Auricchio
- Aurora (pens)
- Autobianchi
- Avio
- Aviointeriors
- Azienda Italiana Petroli Albanesi
- Azienda Nazionale Idrogenazione Combustibili
- Azimut Yachts

== B ==
- B&B Italia
- Baglietto
- Baldelli ceramics
- Baldini & Castoldi
- Baldinini
- Balocco
- Bandini Automobili
- Barbanera Almanac
- Barilla
- Bassetti
- Bburago
- Benelli (firearms)
- Benelli (motorcycles)
- Benetti
- Benetton Group
- Bennet (supermarket)
- Berco
- Beretta
- Bertagni
- Beta (motorcycles)
- Bialetti
- Bianchi Bicycles
- Bimota
- Birel
- Birra Ichnusa
- Birra Menabrea
- Birra Moretti
- Birrificio Angelo Poretti
- Bizzarrini
- Blu
- Bombrini-Parodi-Delfino
- Bonfiglioli
- Bontempi
- Bontoni
- Borile
- Bormioli Rocco
- Borrani
- Borsalino
- Boscolo Hotels
- Bottecchia
- Bottega Giotti
- Bottega Veneta
- BP Studio
- Bracco
- Bravo
- Bremach
- Brembo
- Breton
- Brioni
- Brionvega
- Brondi
- Brumm
- Brunello Cucinelli
- Bticino
- Buitoni
- Bulgari

== C ==
- Cagiva
- CAMP
- Campagnolo
- Campari Group
- Candy
- Cantiere Navale Visentini
- Cantieri Riuniti dell'Adriatico
- Cantine Lungarotti Winery
- Caproni
- Caraceni
- Carapelli
- Carpigiani
- Carraro Agritalia
- Carrozzeria Colli
- Carrozzeria Fissore
- Carrozzeria Ghia
- Cassina
- Castagnari
- Castello del Terriccio
- Roberto Cavalli
- Cecomp
- Ceirano Fabbrica Automobili
- Ceirano
- Cementir
- Ceriani
- Cetra Records
- Chiappa Firearms
- Chiribiri
- Cimbali
- Cinelli
- Cinemeccanica
- Cinzano
- Cirio
- Cisitalia
- Clément Tyres
- CNH Industrial
- Codecasa
- Coin (department store)
- Colnago
- Columbus Tubing
- Comau
- Comus
- Conad
- Coop
- Coppola Foods
- Cosmi Americo & Figlio
- Costume National
- Crumar
- Cugini Randi
- Custom Line
- CVS Ferrari

== D ==
- Dainese
- Dal Negro
- Damiani (jewelry)
- Danieli
- Danieli Automation
- De Cecco
- De Rosa (bicycles)
- De Simon
- De Tomaso
- De'Longhi
- Dell'Orto
- Della Ferrera
- Di Blasi Industriale
- Diadora
- Diatto
- Diesel
- Divella
- Dolce & Gabbana
- Dr. Barbanera
- Ducati
- Ducati Energia

== E ==
- Eca Sindel
- Edison
- Eko guitars
- Elena Mirò
- Ellesse
- Enel
- Eni
- Erg
- Ermenegildo Zegna
- Erreà
- Eurotech
- Extè

== F ==
- Fabbri Group
- Fabbrica Aeroplani Ing. O. Pomilio
- Fabbrica Ligure Automobili Genova
- Fabio Perini
- Facchini Group
- Falc
- Falck Group
- FAMARS
- Fantic Motor
- Farfisa
- Fastweb (telecommunications)
- Fazioli
- Fedrigoni
- Fendi
- Ferrania
- Ferrari
- Ferrari Belotti
- Gianfranco Ferré
- Ferrero
- Ferretti Group
- Ferrovie dello Stato
- Fiat Automobiles
- Fiat Ferroviaria
- Fiat Industrial
- Fiat Powertrain Technologies
- Fiat
- Fila
- Filippi Boats
- Fincantieri
- Fiocchi Munizioni
- Fiol Prosecco
- Fioravanti (automotive)
- Fiorucci
- Flexform
- Fly Products
- Fly Synthesis
- Flying Legend
- Fondmetal
- Franchi (firearms)
- Franco Tosi Meccanica
- Fratelli Branca
- Fratelli Ceirano
- Fratelli Nardi
- Frera
- Frette
- Fulcrum Wheels
- Fulgor

== G ==
- Gaggia
- Gancia
- Garelli Motorcycles
- Garlando
- Gas Jeans
- GCDS
- Geloso
- Geox
- Ghezzi & Brian
- Giacomini
- Gilera
- Gio. Ansaldo & C.
- Giulio Cocchi Spumanti
- Giusto Manetti Battiloro
- Givova
- Goldoni
- Gravati
- Graziano Trasmissioni
- Grecav
- Grif Italia
- Grimaldi Group
- Grivel (mountain climbing)
- Gruppo Riva
- Gucci
- Guerciotti
- Gufram

== H ==
- Hertz mobile audio
- Hoepli
- ho-mobile

== I ==
- Iceberg (fashion house)
- Iliad
- Illy
- IMAM
- Indesit
- Industria Cartaria Pieretti
- Infostrada
- Inglesina Baby
- Innocenti
- Intermarine
- Intesa Sanpaolo
- Intimissimi
- IP
- Iride Bicycles
- Isabel Garcia (clothing)
- Iso (automobile)
- Isotta Fraschini
- Itala
- Italcementi
- Italdesign Giugiaro
- Italian Line
- Italjet
- Iveco

== J ==
- Jenco Valerio

== K ==
- Kappa
- Kartell
- Keglevich
- Kena Mobile
- Kuota

== L ==
- La Molisana
- Lagostina
- Lamborghini
- Lambretta
- Lampre
- Lancia
- Landi Renzo
- Landini (tractor)
- Larusmiani
- Lavazza
- Laverda
- Laverda (harvesters)
- Lazzaroni
- Lechler
- Legea
- Leitner Group
- Leitwind
- Leonardo-Finmeccanica
- Levante (hosiery)
- Lima (models)
- Linkem
- Angelo Litrico
- Liu·Jo
- Lofra
- Lombardini
- Longoni
- Lotto Sport Italia
- Lucchini RS
- Girolamo Luxardo
- Luxottica

== M ==
- Macron (sportswear)
- Maggiora
- Magneti Marelli
- Maire Tecnimont
- Majello
- Malaguti
- Malo
- Malossi
- Mandarina Duck
- Manfrotto
- Mapei
- Marcegaglia
- Mariella Burani Fashion Group
- Marina Rinaldi
- Marni (clothing)
- Martin Motors
- Martini (vermouth)
- Martini & Rossi
- Marzocchi
- Marzotto
- Maserati
- Massimo Zanetti
- Mateba
- Max Mara
- MCS (fashion brand)
- Mebetoys
- Mecc Alte
- Meccanotecnica Riesi
- Mediaset
- Mediashopping
- Menarini
- Mentos
- MER MEC
- Meridiana
- Messagenet
- Metronapoli
- Milano Assicurazioni
- Minarelli
- Missoni
- Mivar
- Moka pot
- Molinari (design)
- Momo
- Moncler
- Mondadori
- Mondial (motorcycle manufacturer)
- Montegrappa
- Moon Boot
- Morbidelli
- Moretti Motor Company
- Moschino
- Moto Guzzi
- Moto Morini
- Moto Rumi
- Motobi
- MV Agusta

== N ==
- Nardi (agricultural machinery manufacturer)
- Nardi (carmaker)
- Nardini (grappa)
- Natuzzi
- Nebiolo Printech
- Nina Ricci
- Nolan Helmets
- Nonino (grappa)
- Nordica
- Nòverca
- Nutella

== O ==
- Off-White
- Officina Stellare
- Officine Meccaniche
- Officine Meccaniche Giovanni Cerutti
- Officine Piccini
- Olidata
- Olivetti
- OMAS
- Orsi Instrument Company
- O.S.C.A.
- OTO Melara
- OZ Group

== P ==
- Pagani (automobile)
- Paglieri
- Paioli
- Panerai
- Panini Group
- Panna (water)
- Pantofola d'Oro
- Parmalat
- Pastiglie Leone
- Paton (motorcycles)
- Davide Pedersoli
- Perazzi
- Perini Navi
- Perlini
- Permasteelisa
- Peroni Brewery
- Persol
- PFM Group
- Phonocar
- Piaggio
- Piaggio Aerospace
- Pinarello
- Pininfarina
- Piquadro
- Pircher Oberland
- Pirelli
- PMT Italia
- Pocher
- Pogliaghi
- Polini
- Poltrona Frau
- Pomellato
- Poste Italiane
- PosteMobile
- Postepay
- Prada
- Pro.Mecc
- Proraso
- Altaneve
- Prysmian Group
- Emilio Pucci

== R ==
- Radici Group
- Radio Marconi
- RAI
- Rainbow
- Giovanni Rana
- Reggiane
- John Richmond (fashion designer)
- Rivarossi

== S ==
- S.P.A. (automobile)
- Sacmi
- Saeco
- Safilo
- SAI Ambrosini
- Saipem
- Salini Impregilo
- Salvatore Ferragamo
- SAME Deutz-Fahr
- San Carlo
- San Pellegrino
- Sanfaustino
- Santamaria (motorcycles)
- SCAM
- Scappino (fashion house)
- SCAT (automobile)
- Seleco
- Selex ES
- SELEX Sistemi Integrati
- Selle Royal
- Siae Microelettronica
- SIAI-Marchetti
- Siata
- SIDI
- Siel
- Sigma-Tau
- Silca
- Silvateam
- Simmel Difesa
- Simod
- SIP
- SIVI
- SLAM (clothing)
- Smeg (appliances)
- Snaidero (furniture)
- Snam
- SNIA
- Società Italiana Ernesto Breda
- Junior F.J.T.A.
- Società Torinese Automobili Rapid
- Soilmec
- Somec
- Sorin Group
- Sparco
- SPICA
- Sportika
- Standa
- Automobili Stanguellini
- Stappj
- Sterilgarda
- STET – Società Finanziaria Telefonica
- Stone Island
- Storero
- Studiotorino
- Suomy
- Superga
- Switchover Media

== T ==
- Tanfoglio
- Tavernello
- Technogym
- Tecnam
- Tecnica Group
- Teksid
- Telepass
- Telespazio
- TeleTu
- Telit
- Temperino
- Terra Modena
- Think Pink (clothing)
- Tic Tac
- TIM
- Tirrenia – Compagnia italiana di navigazione
- Tiscali
- Toscotec
- Total
- ToyWatch
- Trenitalia
- A. Uberti

== U ==
- UniCredit
- UnoAErre
- UPIM

== V ==
- Valentino
- Valpadana
- Valsoia
- Valextra
- Venini
- Versace
- Very Mobile
- Vespa
- Viberti
- Vibram
- Visconti
- Viscount (musical instrument manufacturer)
- Vittoria
- VM Motori
- Voiello
- Vodafone
- Vulcanair
- Vyrus

== W ==
- Weber carburetor
- Welcome Italia
- Wilier Triestina
- Wind
- Wind Tre

== Z ==
- Zamperla
- Zanotta
- Zanussi

== See also ==
- Economy of Italy
- List of companies of Italy
- Lists of brands

=== Categories ===
- Aircraft manufacturers of Italy
- AnsaldoBreda
- Beer brands of Italy
- Cars of Italy
- Clothing brands of Italy
- Eni
- Fincantieri
- Food and drink companies of Italy
- Gio. Ansaldo & C.
- Leonardo S.p.A.
- Motorcycles of Italy
- Italian record labels
- Motor vehicle manufacturers of Italy
- Società Italiana Ernesto Breda
