= Cugini Randi =

Manufacturer of agricultural machinery

- Industry: Agriculture, Tractors, Tillers, motocultivators
- Founded: 1947 (approximately)
- Founder: Umberto, Dardano and Ettore Randi
- Defunct: the mid-1980s
- Headquarters: Bagnacavallo - Ravenna province, Italy
- Products: Tractors, motocultivators, tillers, steering boxes

Cugini Randi was a small Italian manufacturer of agricultural machinery in the 1940s–1980s.

== History ==
Cugini Randi was established around 1947 in Bagnacavallo, in the province of Ravenna. Founded by brothers Umberto and Dardano Randi and their cousin Ettore, the company initially repaired machinery before manufacturing circular saws from recycled materials.

Following the Second World War, the firm began converting surplus Allied military tracked vehicles into agricultural tractors. Umberto Randi, a former engineer at the Autocentro Militare in Bologna, developed a specialized vaporizer that allowed 8-cylinder petrol engines to run on agricultural oil, utilizing salvaged war materials such as large-caliber shell casings.

During the early 1950s, the company transitioned to producing original medium-sized wheeled tractors (models R14 to R50). They also expanded into power tillers and small machinery, including the "Grillo" and the R5 tiller. Following Umberto's death in the late 1950s, the remaining partners pivoted to manufacturing steering boxes and specialized in two-wheel tractors and compact four-wheel-drive vehicles.

At its peak in the 1970s and 1980s, Cugini Randi maintained a distribution network across Italy and exported to Portugal, Greece, and Belgium. However, facing increased competition and a lack of generational succession, the company ceased operations in the mid-1980s, transferring spare parts management to its former employees.

== The transformations (late 1940s) ==
- Tracked tractors obtained by processing military tracked motor vehicles. Adapted American and English military tracked motor vehicles left by the Allies after the end of the war. The engines, petrol 8 cylinder engines were adapted in order to operate with agricultural oil. Umberto, an expert engineer trained in autocentro Militare di Bologna, invented an oil agriculture vaporizer, using remnants of war materials (shells of large caliber bullets and a series of copper tubes). The ignition occurred with petrol fuel. Once ignited, the agricultural oil vaporizator started its work.

== Products (1950s) ==
=== Tractors ===
- R28 - R30 - R32 Tractors: equipped with SPA petrol engines, adapted to work with agricultural oil
- T50 Tractor: equipped with OM CR1D HP50 diesel engine, the same engine fitted by OM Taurus trucks.
- R22 - R30 - R32 Tractors: equipped with VM (Vancini Martelli) diesel engines
- R14 - R25 - R25SV - R35 Tractors: equipped with Deutz HP11-24-32 (F2L514) two-cylinder engines. R25SV was of smaller dimensions in order to easily work among the orchards. R35 was designed in such a way that on the same frame it was possible to build a tracked HP30-45 version. These tracked vehicles, announced in 1954, never entered the production cycle.
- R50 Tractors: equipped with Deutz HP 50 three-cylinder diesel motors.

=== Tillers and motocultivators ===
- 2500 and 3000 Motocultivator: Lombardini or Slanzi or Ruggerini oil engine. 4 + 4 gearbox. It was the first two-wheeled motocultivator designed and manufactured by Cugini Randi company. No PTO were provided.

=== The "Grillo" ===
The Grillo was built around the year 1953. It was a mower with transport capabilities, along with spraying capacity. He was born in a period in which there was an absolute lack of machines. It was fully functional, capable of accomplishment all of these tasks simultaneously

== Products (1960s) ==
=== Small tractors ===
- R4 Tractor: equipped with Lombardini HP15 or Slanzi HP18,5 gasoline / diesel engines. 4-wheel drive, articulated.

=== Motocultivators ===
- 2500, 3000, 3500, 4000 Motocultivators: Lombardini or Slanzi or Ruggerini oil engine. 4 + 4 gearbox. The original color adopted by these machines was grey-red instead of the classic green-white adopted later and during the 1970s and 1980s.

=== Tillers ===
- R-5 Tiller: two-stroke Minarelli HP5 petrol engine.

== Products (1970s and 1980s) ==
=== Small tractors ===
- R418 - R424 Tractors: equipped with Lombardini HP21 or Slanzi HP26 -30 gasoline / diesel engines. Low specific weight, strong adhesion, low center of gravity, 4-wheel drive, articulated. Qualities that allowed the machine to be the winner of the 1st Prize at the 6th concorso antinfortunistico ENPI (Ente Nazionale Prevenzione Infortuni) for machines to be used on sloping ground

=== Motocultivators ===
- 2500 and 3000 Motocultivator: Lombardini or Slanzi or Ruggerini oil engine. 4 + 4 gearbox. It was the first two-wheeled motocultivator designed and manufactured by Cugini Randi company. No PTO were provided.
- 2500 super and 3600 Motocultivator: Lombardini HP18-21 or Slanzi HP26-30 petrol / diesel engine. 6-speed gearbox. Equipped with spherical differential locking, reverse gear, adjustable handlebar, two PTO, one of which synchronized with the transmission. Also available with powered trailer version.
- 4000 Motocultivator: similar to 3600 Series but with 4-speed gearbox.
- 650 Motocultivator: Lombardini HP13-11-10 petrol / diesel engine. Equipped with differential lock, reverse gear, adjustable and reversible handle bar, two PTO, one of which synchronized with the transmission. Cutter bar version and powered trailer version also available.
- 6000 Junior Motocultivator: Lombardini or Ruggerini HP14-16 diesel engine. Equipped with differential lock, reversing safety mechanism, adjustable handlebar, two PTO. Also available with powered trailer version. The safety mechanism, invented, designed and finally adopted by Cugini Randi, first on the 6000 Junior and then adopted across the range, allowed the model to be the winner of the 1st Prize at the 6th competition antinfortunistico ENPI (Ente Nazionale Prevenzione Infortuni) for machines to be used on sloping ground. The mechanism allowed to engage the reverse gear, but the motocultivator was enabled to retreat only if the cutter was disengaged. A version with a third independent PTO for the Portuguese market was produced. The motocultivators were also painted with red color instead of the traditional green color.
- 6000 Super Motocultivator: Lombardini HP14-16-18P diesel engine. Equipped with spherical differential locking, reversing safety mechanism, adjustable handlebar, two PTO, one of which is synchronized with the transmission. Also available with powered trailer version.

=== Tillers ===
- R-4 Tiller: two-stroke petrol engine HP4
- R-7 Tiller: two-stroke petrol engine HP7
- R-8 Tiller: two-stroke petrol or diesel engine HP8
- R-6M Tiller: two-stroke Minarelli HP6 petrol engine. In practice, a small, lightweight, two drive wheels motocultivator, able to work with a single wheel in all interrow crops
- R-2000 Tiller: 4-strokes Lombardini HP10-14 petrol / diesel engine. Equipped with a safety reverse mechanism, allowing the machine to stop in the space of a few centimeters. The safety mechanism, invented, designed and finally adopted by Cugini Randi across the range of their tillers, allowed the model to be the winner of the 1st Prize at the 6th competition antinfortunistico ENPI (Ente Nazionale Prevenzione Infortuni) for machines to be used on sloping ground. The safety mechanism was designed to enter immediately in operation and in case of breakage of the clutch cable too.

=== Steering boxes ===
- Steering boxes model G5 - 267, G5 - 267 ROV., G5 - 250, G5 - 279, G5 - 279 ROV., G14 - 558, G14 - 558 ROV., G14 - 535

== Bibliography ==
- Dozza, William (2004). Trattori classici italiani: dal 1911 al 1955 (in Italian). Giorgio Nada Editore Srl. ISBN 978-88-7911-321-2.
- Dozza, William (2007). Carioche. Le trattrici agricole figlie della guerra (in Italian). Giorgio Nada Editore Srl. ISBN 978-88-7911-431-8.
- Vitozzi, Matteo (2016). Trattori, motori e carioche di Romagna (in Italian). Asi Service Srl. ISBN 889834435X.
