= Borile =

Italian manufacturer of retro-style bicycles and motorcycles

- Founded: 1988; 38 years ago
- Founder: Umberto Borile
- Defunct: 2001
- Headquarters: Vò, Padua
- Area served: Worldwide
- Key people: Umberto Borile (President), Alberto Bassi (CEO)
- Products: Motorcycles and bicycles
- Owner: Umberto Borile

Borile makes retro-modern bicycles and motorcycles in Padua, Italy, such as the B500CR, "a modern day interpretation of how a BSA Gold Star would look if it were produced today." Borile's technically advanced yet aesthetically vintage motorcycles are at the center of a marked retro wave during the first decade of the 21st century. Early Boriles were handmade, limited-production creations, but later models are mass-produced.

== See also ==
- List of Italian companies
- List of motorcycle manufacturers
