= Giacomini =

Italian producer of heating and cooling systems

Giacomini S.p.A.
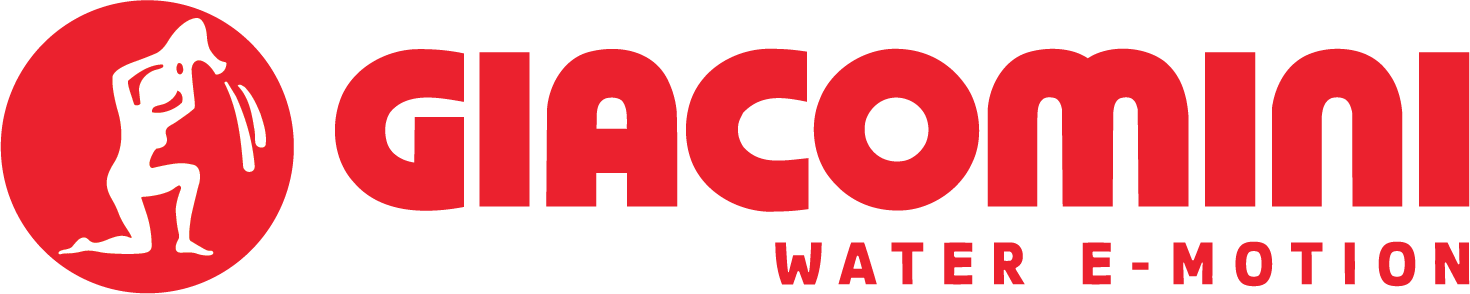
- Company type: Private
- Industry: Heating and cooling products manufacturing
- Founded: 1951
- Founder: Alberto Giacomini
- Headquarters: San Maurizio d'Opaglio, Italy
- Products: Underfloor & Ceiling heating and cooling systems, Thermal energy metering, water & gasses regulation
- Number of employees: over 1000
- Website: Giacomini.com

Giacomini is a global producer of underfloor & ceiling heating and cooling systems, thermal energy metering and water & gasses regulation. Currently Giacomini employs over 1000 workers, exporting around 80% of its production in over 100 countries all around the world. The headquarters of Giacomini is in San Maurizio d'Opaglio, Italy.

The company's assortment consists of more than 6,000 product items made in 4 factories in Italy. Every day Giacomini processes 100 tons of brass into 85 tons of Giacomini products.

== Company history ==
- Giacomini was founded in 1951 by Alberto Giacomini as a small manufacture workshop producing brass taps.
- In 1955 the company moved to San Maurizio d'Opaglio, its current headquarters location, and started to manufacture its products in a new 1500 square meters production plant.
- In 1961 the first European Distribution Branch was set up in Waldbröl in Germany.
- In the 1970s three more branches were established in Belgium, France, Switzerland to strengthen Giacomini's position on the European market.
- In 1972 the second manufacturing unit was set up, the forging plant at Castelnuovo del Garda, in the province of Verona. The intention was an integration that could assure a better quality standard of the raw materials.
- In 1980 the advertising campaign named “Programma 80” was launched, linked to the idea of transforming a manual valve into a thermostatic one, thanks to the substitution of the hand-wheel with an automatic head.
- In 1986 the company got the BSI certification, which confirmed a company’s policy aimed to the maintenance and the improvement of the quality through strict procedures.
- In the 1990s two more branches owned by the parent company were established in Spain and Portugal, and Giacomini started to gain its position in Central Europe by partnership with private companies located in the Czech Republic and Slovakia.
- In 1994 the third manufacturing plant was opened processing plastic materials: a large window allows to observe the 20,000 square meters’ shed with all its machinery being in operation.
- In 2001 Giacomini celebrated its 50th anniversary.
- In 2002 and 2003 three new branches established in Argentina, United Kingdom and China.
- In 2006 a zero emission Hydrogen boiler was presented to the public during the Winter Olympic Games in Turin.
- In 2008 an Indian private company became a partner of Giacomini S.p.A. and started to introduce Giacomini's products and systems.
- In 2010 Giacomini invested in 20.000 square meters of photovoltaic cells, which cover the roofs of the two main production plants in San Maurizio d'Opaglio.
- In 2011 Giacomini celebrated its 60th anniversary.
- 2013 saw the start of operations in Brazil.

== See also ==
- List of Italian companies
