= Tavernello =

Trade name for Italian table wine

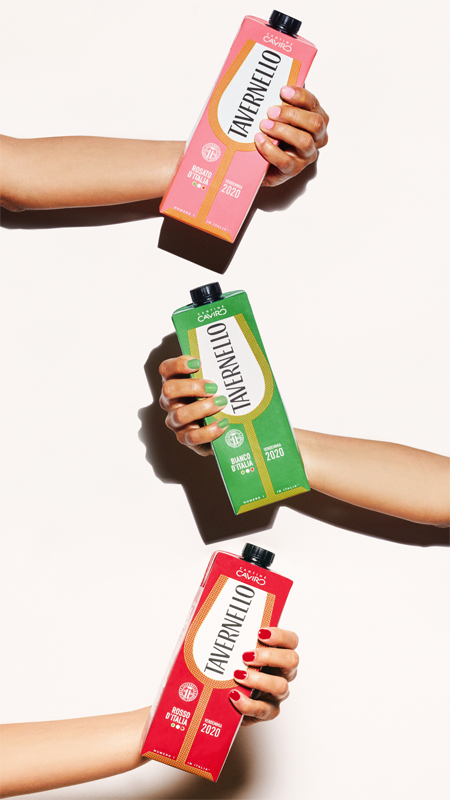
Three types of Tavernello bricks

Tavernello is the trade name for an Italian table wine widely advertised as Italy's #1 Wine and commercially sold in Italy and internationally by the wine cooperative Caviro. It is the first wine produced in Italy which was sold in a Tetra Pak container and also for its low price (under 2 Euros as of January 2009).

The only markets where an exception is made in the packaging of Tavernello wine are in Japan and the UK, where it is sold in traditional wine bottles between 500 and 700 yen / £3.50 and £5 in supermarket chains. While the bottles initially featured a traditional cork, it was recently changed to an aluminum screw top as a cost-saving measure and to ensure long term freshness.

== Appellations sold ==
- Pinot grigio Pinot bianco Veneto IGT
- Trebbiano Rubicone IGT
- Nero d'Avola Sicilia IGT
- Merlot Veneto IGT
- Sangiovese Rubicone IGT
- Pinot grigio delle Venezie IGT
