= Castello del Terriccio =

Italian Winery

Coordinates: 43.369886°N 10.512438°E

Castello del Terriccio is an Italian winery in Tuscany near the Tyrrhenian Sea. Proprietor Dr. Gian Annibale Rossi di Medelana noted the success of Sassicaia and intends to make his own version. Its grand vin is the eponymous Castello del Terriccio. The vineyard introduced Lupicaia in the 1993 vintage; it is a Cabernet Sauvignon-based red wine blend with Merlot and Petit Verdot. The component wine varieties of Lupicaia ferment separately in stainless steel tanks, and aged in barrique for 18 to 24 months before blending and bottling.

== Wine criticism ==
The 2010 vintage was given a score of 95 by Wine Advocate. The 2005 vintage was given a score of 18/20 by Jancis Robinson.
