= Sanfaustino =

Italian carbonated mineral water

- Country: Italy
- Source: Sanfaustino Spring
- Type: sparkling
- pH: 5.9
- Calcium (Ca): 450
- Chloride (Cl): 18.6
- Bicarbonate (HCO_{3}): 1100
- Fluoride (F): 0.19
- Manganese (Mn): 1.13
- Magnesium (Mg): 19.3
- Nitrate (NO_{3}): 3.8
- Potassium (K): 3
- Silica (SiO_{2}): 14.3
- Sodium (Na): 21
- Strontium (Sr): 1.29
- Sulfate (SO_{4}): 96.7
- TDS: 1170
- Website: sanfaustino.com
- All concentrations in milligrams per liter (mg/L); pH without units

Sanfaustino is a brand of effervescent mineral water.

Since 1894, Sanfaustino is sourced from a spring in Villa San Faustino, Province of Perugia, Umbria, Italy.
