= ToyWatch =

Luxury Italian watchmaking company

ToyWatch Spa
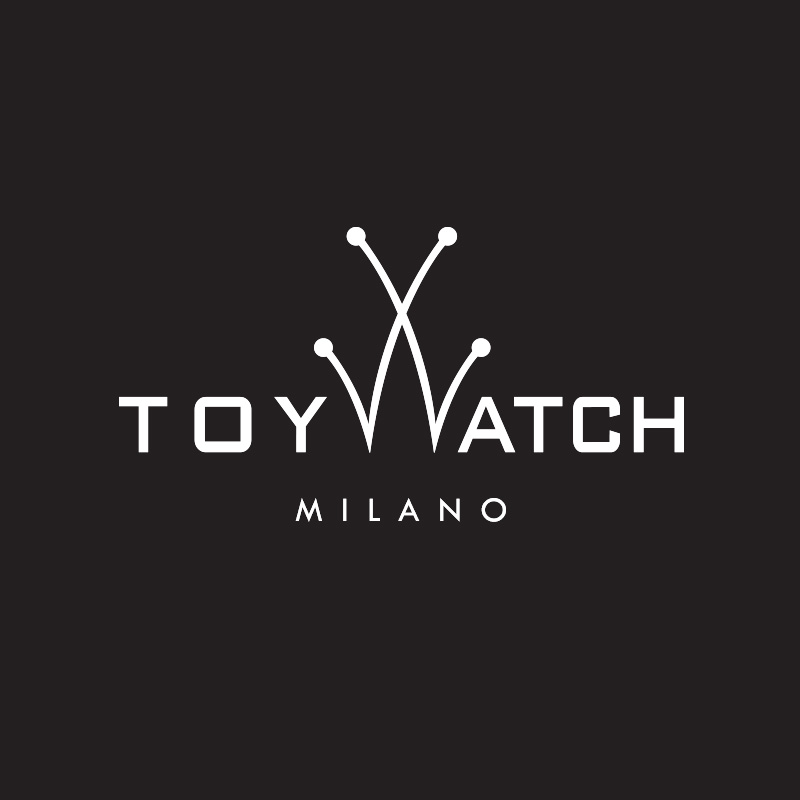
- Industry: Watch manufacturing
- Founded: 2006
- Headquarters: Milan, Italy
- Key people: Stefano Cassina, President and CEO
- Products: Watches; Pocket watches
- Owner: ILP III Sca Sicar - J. Hirsch & Co.
- Website: toywatchprivatesales.com

ToyWatch is a luxury Italian watchmaking company that was founded in Milan in 2006.

== History ==
ToyWatch began developing in 2006 with the launch of their first collection. During the same year, ToyWatch established its American subsidiary, ToyWatch USA. A second subsidiary was later opened in Hong Kong.

In 2011, ToyWatch opened its shareholding to the ILP III private equity fund managed by J. Hirsch & Co., which held a share of 49%. As of March 2013, the ILP III private equity fund holds the entire share capital of ToyWatch.

In 2015, the company's products were sold in more than 2,000 stores and in 26 boutiques (11 flagship stores and 15 franchise stores) [4 spread all over the world. Flagship stores can be found in Italy in Milan, Rome, Florence, Venice, Porto Cervo, and Forte dei Marmi. Some other boutiques are located in cities such as London, Paris, Lahore, Cannes, Puerto Banus, and Kuala Lumpur.

The company was dissolved on October 11, 2016.

== Watches ==
The company was originally known for producing colorful watches made from plastic. The company today produces watches from a variety of materials, including plastic, polycarbonate, plasteramic, aluminum, and steel, and incorporates other materials such as Swarovski elements, silicon, ceramic, gold, and diamonds.

ToyWatch watches have been featured on Oprah's Favorite Things list for 2007 [2 and on The Ellen DeGeneres Show in 2009.

== Collections ==
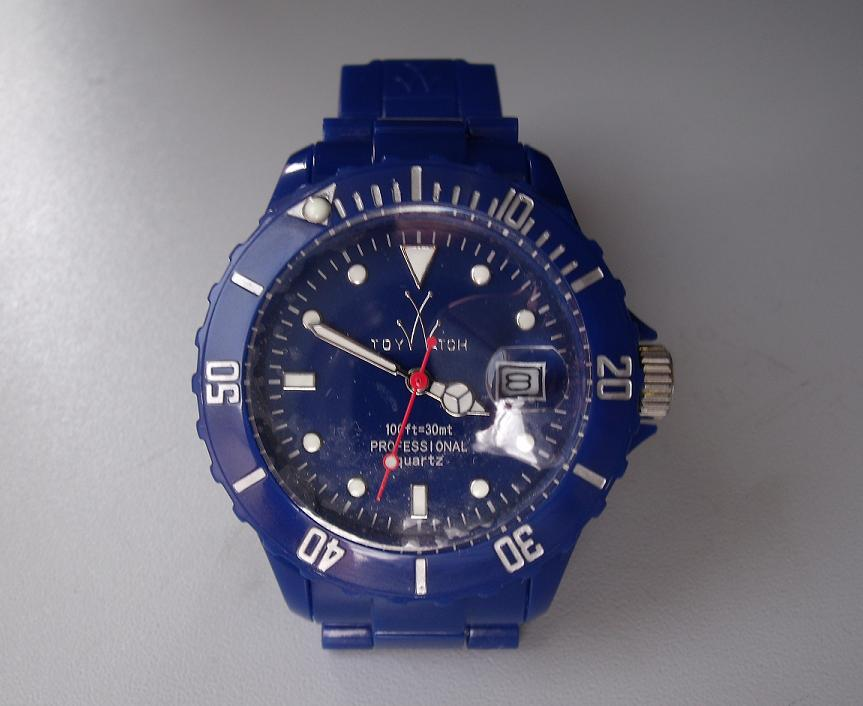
ToyWatch Fluo Blue

Collections chronology:

- 2006: Total Stones
- 2007: Skull
- 2008: Fluo, Ceramica, Kris
- 2009: Skeleton, Heavy Metal
- 2010: J-Looped
- 2011: Velvety
- 2012: Metallic Aluminum, Maya
- 2013: ToyMrHyde
- 2015: Maya Natural Stones

Collections available at the beginning of 2015 (in alphabetical order):

- Cruise
- Cruise Graffiti
- Fluo
- Jetlag
- Monnalisa
- Monochrome
- Maya
- Maya Chrono
- Maya Natural Stones
- Metallic Collection
- Total Stones
- ToyCandy
- ToyCruise Metal
- ToyFloat
- ToyGlass
- ToyGlow
- ToyMrHyde
- ToyRing
- ToyStrong
- ToySwing
- ToyViper
- Velvety
- Vintage Collection
