= Bravo (company) =

Italian machine manufacturer

Bravo S.p.A.
- Company type: Public Company
- Industry: Food production appliances
- Founded: 1967; 59 years ago in Montecchio Maggiore
- Founder: Genesio Bravo
- Headquarters: Montecchio Maggiore, Italy
- Area served: Worldwide
- Products: Gelato, pastry, chocolate and savory food machines
- Divisions: Bravo Asia; Bravo France; Bravo North America
- Website: www.bravo.it

Bravo is an Italian company that produces machines for gelato, pastry, chocolate and savory food production worldwide.

== History ==
It was founded in 1967 in Montecchio Maggiore by Genesio Bravo, as an industrial machine manufacturing company specializing in machines for gelato shops.

Initially, production was focused on multi-machines, pasteurizers and batch freezers, until 1974, when Genesio Bravo conceived and built the first multi-purpose machine for the production of artisanal gelato, called "Trittico".

Over the years, the company grew in terms of turnover, repositioning itself in the market, increasing the production of machines and models, expanding the sales network and progressively inaugurating various branches in the world: in 1982 it opened a subsidiary in France, in 2010 in Asia and in 2011 in North America.
