= Molinari (design) =

Italian furniture company

- Industry: Furniture and home interiors
- Headquarters: Tione di Trento, Italy
- Website: https://www.molinaridesign.com

Molinari is an Italian producer of leather sofas, armchairs, stools, and desks. Molinari regularly exhibits at the furniture fair Salone Internazionale del Mobile in Milan, Italy.
