= Messagenet =

Messagenet S.P.A.
- Company type: Società per azioni
- Industry: Telecommunications
- Founded: 1999
- Founder: Marco Fiorentino, Andrea Misa Galli
- Headquarters: Milan, Italy
- Key people: Andrea Misa Galli (CEO)
- Products: VoIP, Fax, SMS, Messagenet Talk for iOS and Android
- Website: Messagenet.com

Messagenet S.P.A. is a company based in Milan, Italy, that develops and sells VoIP and internet fax services. The company claims to have more than 500,000 registered users, 400,000 telephone numbers assigned, more than 7 million minutes of conversation and two and a half million faxes processed per month. Messagenet is a sister company of KPNQwest Italia.

== History ==
Messagenet was founded in 1999 by Marco Fiorentino and Andrea Galli.

In 1999, the company (as COMM2000) launched FreeFAX, a service which allows users to receive faxes by mail through the free activation of a geographical number.

In 2002 the company added the pay service FAXin enabling users to receive unlimited faxes from their email to any number worldwide.

In 2004 Messagenet entered the voice market with a technological infrastructure developed entirely in house and launched FreeNumber – a free VoIP service – as well as SmartNumber, the extended version of the same service. Both services assign users a VoIP landline telephone number (with an area code of choice).

In 2005, Messagenet launched SmartSMS, a web based service for sending and receiving SMS messages directly from user's computer running Microsoft Windows or Mac OS X.

In 2008 Messagenet obtains the general authorization as telephone operator (for the Italian market) which permitted the company to offer its own geographical numbers as well as the possibility of number portability from other Italian telephone operators.

In 2011 Messagenet released on the iOS store Messagenet Talk a free app which allows Messagenet users to talk and text for free, call/SMS to any phone number worldwide at advantageous rates and the possibility to add national/ international phone lines to one's mobiles thus eliminating roaming charges.

In April 2013 Messagenet presented the world's first WebRTC-based smartphone app (beta) for Android (Messagenet Talk), that functions as part of a commercial VoIP service and does not require a WebRTC-enabled browser.

In February 2014, Messagenet launched Mtalk.net which provides registered users with a free and permanent personal webpage address, which can then be clicked on by contacts who want to initiate a voice call or text message.

Messagenet is part of the COMM2000 Group, together with KPNQwest Italia.
