= Fly Products =

Italian aircraft manufacturer

Coordinates: 42.982575°N 3.8436383°E

Fly Products SRL
- Company type: Private company
- Industry: Aerospace
- Products: Paramotors; Powered parachutes
- Website: www.flyproducts.it

Fly Products SRL is an Italian aircraft manufacturer based in Grottammare. The company specializes in the design and manufacture of paramotors and powered parachutes.

== Aircraft ==
Summary of aircraft built by Fly Products
Model name	First flight	Number built	Type
Fly Products Gold		1000+	Paramotor
Fly Products Jet			Paramotor
Fly Products Kompress			Paramotor
Fly Products Max			Paramotor
Fly Products Power			Paramotor
Fly Products Race			Paramotor
Fly Products Rider			Paramotor
Fly Products Sprint			Paramotor
Fly Products Thrust			Paramotor
Fly Products Eco			Powered parachute
Fly Products Flash			Powered parachute
Fly Products Xenit			Powered parachute
Fly Products Eclipse			Paramotor

== See also ==
- List of Italian companies
