= Industria Cartaria Pieretti =

Italian cardboard company

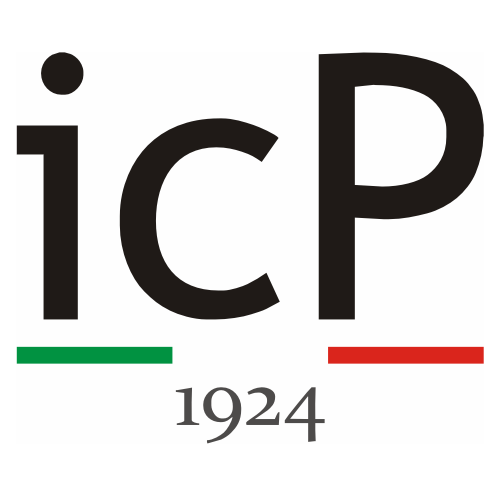
- Industry: Paper
- Founded: 1924
- Founder: Giuseppe Pieretti
- Headquarters: Marlia, Lucca, Italy
- Key people: Graziano Pieretti, Chairman and CEO
- Revenue: €40 million (2009)
- Number of employees: 98
- Website: pieretti.it

Industria Cartaria Pieretti (icP) is an Italian company that produces cardboard for industrial use, made starting from waste paper. Its headquarters are in Marlia, inside the Lucca paper district.

== History ==
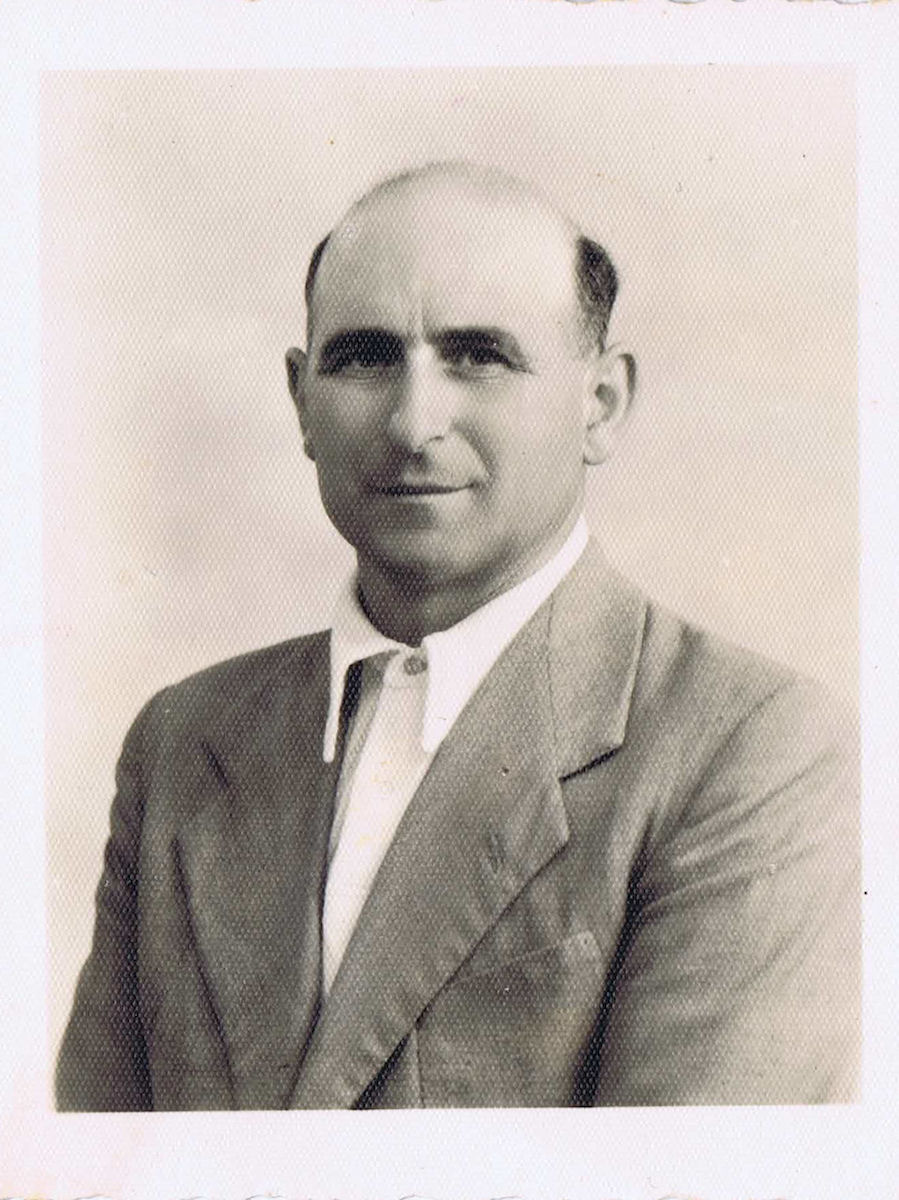
Giuseppe Pieretti, founder of IcP

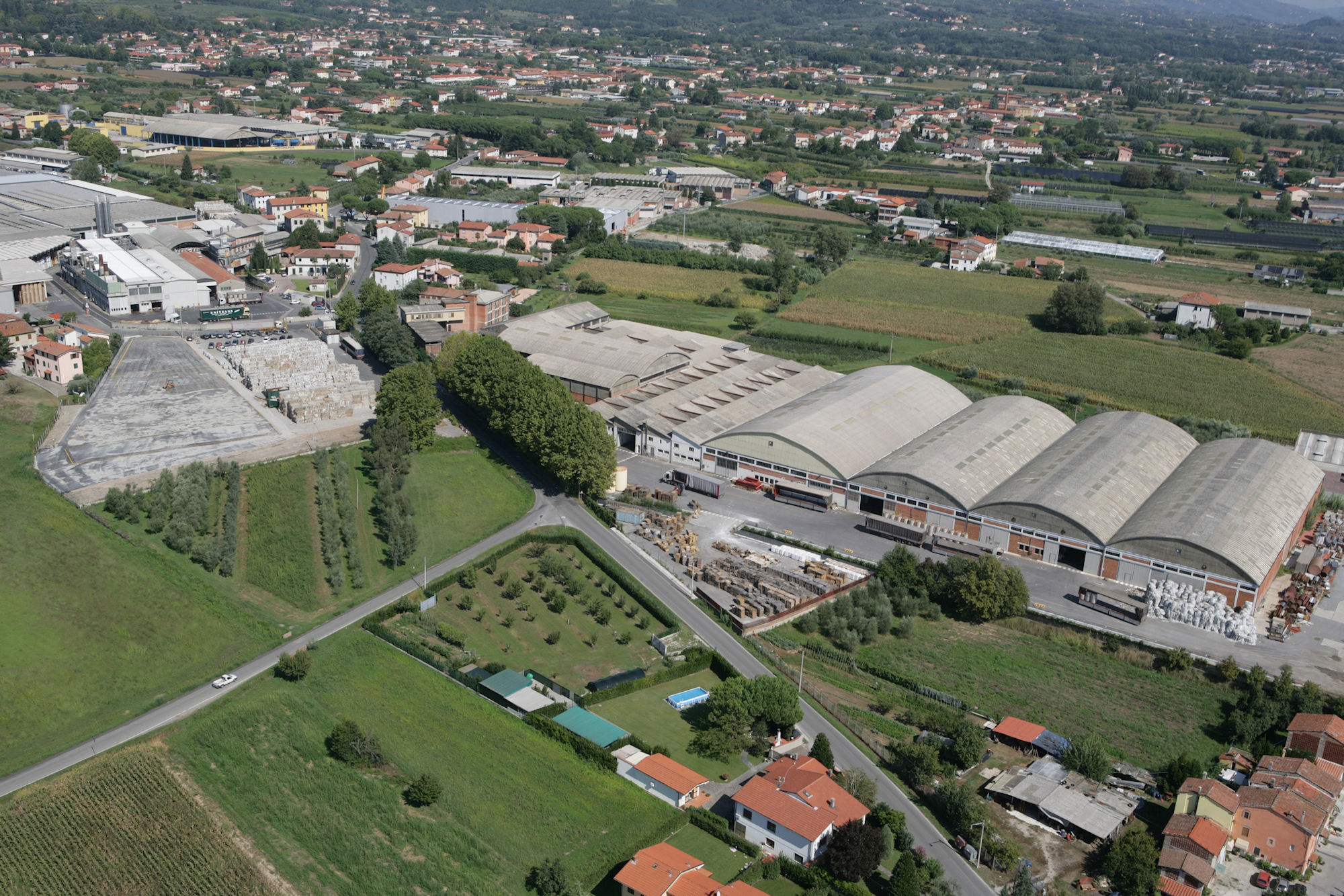
IcP facilities in Lucca

In 1924, Giuseppe Pieretti founds in Marlia the F.lli Pieretti company (Pieretti Brothers), which starts producing straw paper. From 1935 to 1938, the company activities are expanded; they come to include the management of some more paper mills all around Italy. During the 1950s, Giuseppe's sons (Adriano, Graziano and Luisiano) take over the control of the whole company.

With the second generation in control, icP's core business shifts to packaging paper, completely made of waste paper. The 1970s marked the beginning of the corrugated cardboard production (1978). Two years later, the activities focus on stripe-cut board, so that it can be used in the production of tissue rolls cores or industrial tubes.

== Products ==
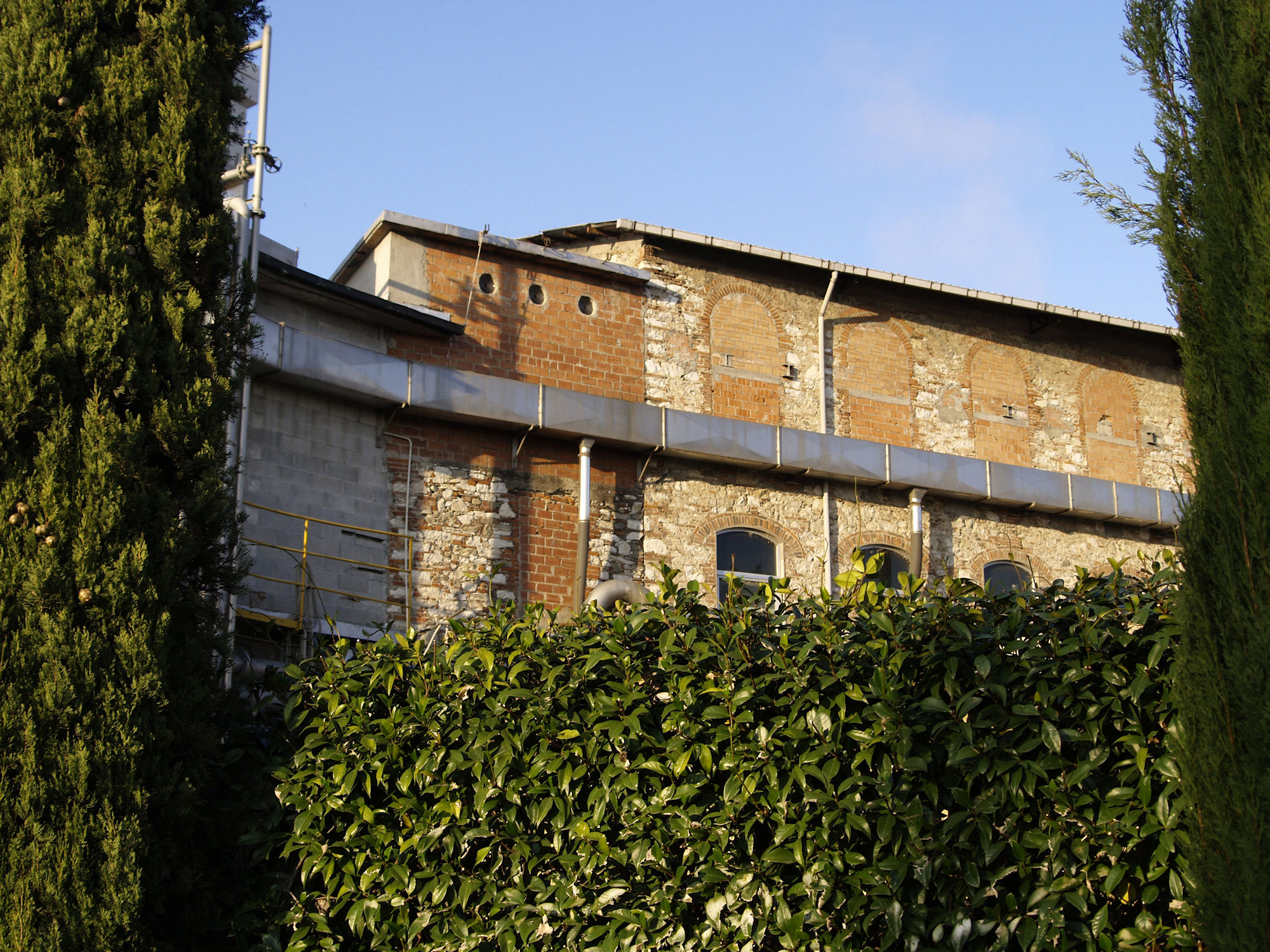
IcP old facilities

Every year approximately 120,000 tons of board are produced, with a gross income of more than 40 million euros. 60% of icP's total production is sold in Italy; the left part is exported throughout the world.

icP produces four kinds of paperboard: 50% of the production is used in the tissue cores market; 30% in the corrugated paperboard market; the remaining 20% is used for industrial tubes. The weight stays between 140 and 420 g/m^{2}.

== Organization ==
- Graziano Pieretti, Chairman, CEO
- Luisiano Pieretti, Vicechairman, CEO
- Tiziano Pieretti, Member of the Board of Directors
- Carmen Pieretti, Member of the Board of Directors

== See also ==
- Toilet paper
