= Eca Sindel =

ECA Sindel
- Founded: 1982
- Area served: Worldwide
- Products: Maritime training simulators
- Parent: ECA Group
- Website: www.eca-sindel.com

ECA-Sindel was an Italian company operating worldwide in the designing, manufacturing, installation, and maintenance of professional tactical and operational naval simulators. ECA -Sindel also produced integrated systems for training purposes in joint warfare operations by land, sea and air, called "Joint Warfare Simulators".

== Name ==
The choice of the name Sindel was made in reference to an illustrious predecessor in the history of Italian technology. The first company to bear the name was a society founded in 1956 by a group of former engineers of Microlambda who were among the pioneers in the development of radar technology in post-war Italy. (This original Sindel would eventually merge with Microlambda in 1960 to form Selenia)

== History ==
Founded in 1982, Sindel began its activities developing simulation systems for the training of radar operators creating electronic equipment that could simulate a real nautical environment. The Company has placed itself from the earliest years in a niche of the simulator market, which was then characterized by large companies that manufactured optical-mechanical systems run by large and expensive mainframes; Sindel products, however, were based on specific software installed on standard commercial computers. These simulators are better suited to nautical schools, and other institutions with smaller budget than larger organizations like military academies, or radar institutes. Since the beginning the company has collaborated with the Guglielmo Marconi Radar Institute of Genoa which has provided Sindel of the essential know-how, to develop a valid training system for radar operators. The functionality of that system has gradually evolved to ensure the adequate stimulation of radars with ARPA capability, depth sounders and government systems such as the rudder and the engine-room telegraph. Over the years, following the evolution of real systems installed on board, naval simulators have become rich, complex systems with many components such as ECDIS electronic navigational charts, AIS navigation radio helpers, and GMDSS communications systems. From 2002 to 2006 the company developed the ASWTT, an integrated anti-submarine combat simulator for the South Korean Navy. In 2006 the Sindel brand was acquired by the ECA SA group of Toulon, along with some Italian private investors, and since then operates under the extended name of ECA Sindel. The acquisition by the ECA group, active in the marine robotics field, has expanded the application areas of the simulation systems, including now simulators for underwater robots such ROV and AUV, and logical guidance for radio-controlled surface crafts (USV, Unmanned Surface Vehicle). The company went out of business in 2018.

== See also ==
- Serious game
- Military exercise
- Military simulation
- List of Italian Companies
