= Comus (company) =

Comus S.p.A.
- Company type: Musical instruments
- Industry: Musical instruments
- Headquarters: Ancona, Italy

Comus S.p.A. is an Italian musical instrument manufacturer, best known for manufacturing electronic and electric small home organs and chord organs, as well as musical toys. In the late 1980s, the business was Europe's largest manufacturer of keyboard instruments. Comus was owned by the larger Bontempi musical instrument company, for whom they build chord organs.

== Patents ==
- KEYBOARD FOR CHORD ORGAN - Thomas S. Lo Duca et al. - 84/443; 84/450; 84/715; 84/DIG.22; D17/5
- Electric Organ - United States Patent D248694
- Electronic organ- United States Patent D276534
