= Silca (company) =

Italian key cutting machine manufacturing company

Silca S.p.A.
- Company type: Società per Azioni (S.p.A.)
- Industry: Metalworking Industry
- Founded: 1974; 52 years ago as S.p.A.
- Headquarters: Vittorio Veneto, Italy
- Area served: Worldwide
- Key people: Stefano Zocca (COO)
- Products: Key blanks, mechanical and electronic key cutting machines, semi industrial and industrial key cutting machines, transponder keys devices, keys marking devices, key cutting machines software, keys and key cutting machines accessories
- Services: Keys and key cutting machines Manufacturer
- Number of employees: 400 (Italy) (900 (Key Systems EMEA/AP/SAM))
- Parent: Kaba Group
- Subsidiaries: Silca S.p.A. - Italy; Silca GmbH - Germany; Silca S.A.S. - France; Silca Ltd. – the United Kingdom; Silca Key Systems S.A. – Spain; H. Chillekens & ZN. B.V. – the Netherlands; Minda Silca Engineering Ltd. - India; Kaba Do Brasil Ltda - Brazil; Minda Silca Engineering Ltd. - India; Wah Yuet Group Holdings Ltd. - China; Silca South America S.A. - Colombia
- Website: www.silca.biz

Silca S.p.A. is an Italian manufacturer of keys, key cutting machines, semi industrial and industrial key cutting machines.

Silca S.p.A. is a subsidiary of Kaba Group, a provider of selected segments of the security industry. Kaba Holding AG is listed on the SIX Swiss Stock Exchange and employs around 7,500 people in more than 60 countries. Silca distributes its products all over the world through 130 selected distributors and 8 Business units (Italy, Germany, France, the United Kingdom, Spain, the Netherlands, India and Brazil).

== History ==
Silca was founded as “Società per Azioni” Società Italiana Lavorazione Chiavi e Affini in 1974 in Vittorio Veneto, Italy, transforming the handcraft of key manufacturing and duplication into an industrial activity.

In the span of ten years I.M.P.S.A., now Silca S.A.S., was founded in Paris, Silca U.K. Ltd. in London, and Silca Deutschland GmbH in Heiligenhaus, later moved to Velbert, Germany. In 1989 Silca started operating overseas with the subsidiary Silca Keys U.S.A. based in Twinsburg (Ohio).

In the late 1990s, Silca acquired several companies specialised in the production of key machinery and security products (Bollini s.r.l., GBZ, Elzett) and in 1997 it merged with the Canadian key manufacturer Unican Group. In 2000 the Spanish Business Unit Silca Unican Iberica S.A., today Silca Key Systems S.A., was opened in Barcelona. In the same year Silca acquired its competitor Ilco Orion S.p.A.

In 2001 Kaba Holding AG took over the Unican Group, creating one of the largest companies worldwide operating within the security business. In the first decade of 2000 Silca has increased the functions and technologies applied to its key cutting machines and the launch of customised finishing for key blanks.

== Core business and products ==
Silca's core business is represented by the production of key blanks, with a product range of over 66,000 items designed for the most diverse uses, from airplanes to mail-boxes keys.

Silca designs and manufactures key cutting machines, both mechanical and electronic, and related accessories, customised duplicating and originating semi industrial and industrial systems for the lock and automotive industries, in over 250 versions, and engineers in-house software dedicated to the electronic programming and duplication of keys.

== See also ==
- List of Italian companies
