= Pircher Oberland =

- Founded: 1928
- Headquarters: Italy

Pircher Oberland Srl is an Italian company operating in the field of sustainable timber construction, DIY and garden furnishings. It was founded in 1928 by Josef Pircher and has been subsequently managed by the Pircher family. In 2010, it was awarded the Red Dot Design Award for its modular wooden construction system, Planit.

== Company history ==
Pircher Oberland Srl was founded by Josef Pircher in 1928, who opened a sawmill in Toblach, in the northern Italian province of South Tyrol. From 1956 he was supported by his son Reinhard, who later on would enlarge and diversify the company. As of 2010, the company remains under the management of the Pircher Family.

In 1968, the company produced its first original Finnish sauna, and in 1978 it entered the DIY market with its "Holzmarkt" product line. 1969 Pircher opened a new site in Cittiglio (Varese, Italy), first production of concrete roof tiles, followed by the production of concrete channels. In 1990 the warehouse and logistics of Holzmarkt products moved to Bondeno di Gonzaga. Lamellar wooden beams have been produced since 1992. 1990 starts the production of pressure-impregnated wood for outdoor furniture (Tartaruga line). 1996 construction of the new site in Rolo, which becomes a new logistics and CRM centre. 2003 Reinhard Pircher, known as an enlightened entrepreneur and great visionary, died. 2005 opens the second production site for concrete products in Gazzuolo (Mantova, Italy) and 2018 all concrete production was concentrated at the renovated and expanded site in Gazzuolo. 2019 marks the beginning of a new era with the definition of a modern, cross-cutting corporate vision and culture, and the gradual implementation of a radically renewed corporate strategy, successfully implemented since 2024.

== Planit ==
In 2010, Pircher Overland Spa was awarded the Red Dot Design Award for product design for its modular wooden construction system, Planit. Planit is a modular prefabricated system, made of natural wood, and planned by Studio Bestetti e Associati of Milan. Planit modules have three different measures which can be combined in different ways to create different architectural compositions that can serve as civil residences as well as production sites. The principal materials used are wood and glass; its structure allows a thermal and an acoustic isolation. The product innovation lies in the evolution of the concept of living which acquires another connotation, namely a more responsible and sustainability-oriented way of life.

== See also ==
- List of Italian companies
