= Giusto Manetti Battiloro =

Giusto Manetti Battiloro S.p.A.
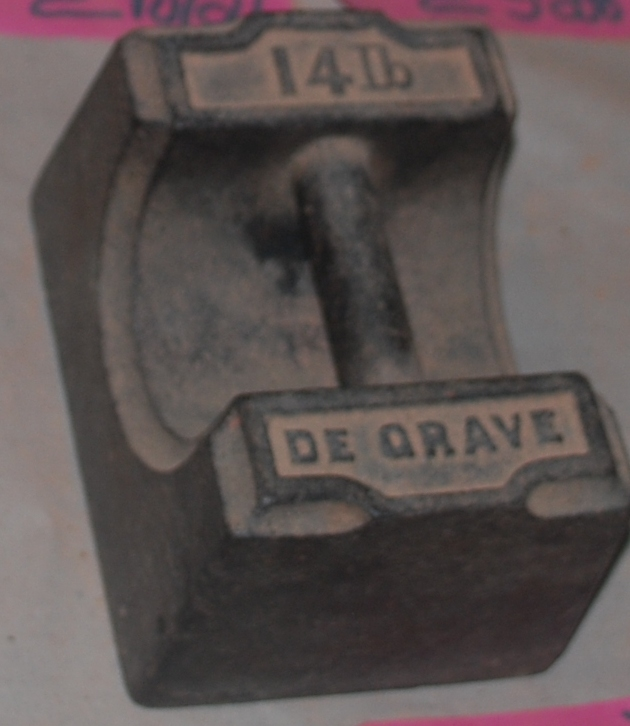
- Type: Private
- Founded: Florence, Italy (1820)
- Headquarters: Florence, Italy
- Products: Gold leaf Hot Stamping foil Edible gold
- Number of employees: 130 (2008)
- Website: manetti.com/en

Giusto Manetti Battiloro is a historic Florentine company that produces and sells gold leaf. Today it is led by the fifteenth generation of the Manetti family, who have been practicing the art of gold beating since 1600. The artisan workshop founded in the seventeenth century became a real company in 1820.

== The history of the company ==
The Manetti family started the Battiloro business in 1600 when Matteo Manetti, son of Agostino Manetti, became a goldsmith, decorator and gilder. A pupil of Francesco di Jacopo da Empoli, he moved to Rome in the years in which the basilica of San Pietro was being built, and here he established himself as one of the most brilliant Italian artists. In 1602 he was recalled to Florence by the then architect of the Duomo Alessandro Bronzino Allori to restore the sphere of the dome of Santa Maria del Fiore destroyed by lightning. The work was completed in just a month and the Grand Duchy, in recognition of the excellent success of the restoration, appointed Matteo Manetti Goldsmith of the Opera, the first recognition to the Manetti family. Meanwhile, his cousin Paolo built the workshop in Florence and began working for the Medici family together with his son Matteo, thus passing on the secrets of the family business. Lorenzo de 'Medici, in 1633, will be the godfather of Matteo's first son, named Lorenzo in honor of him. The cultural and political crisis that hit the city of Florence with the progressive decline of the Medici dynasty also had repercussions on the workshop, which was experiencing difficult times in those years. However, the family continues to practice the art of gold beating and to innovate the production processes of the leaf. In 1732, Maestro Niccolò Manetti was appointed consul of the Academy of Design Arts. The workshop moved from Santo Stefano in Pane, a district on the outskirts of Florence, to San Lorenzo, the "heart" of the artisan city. The great changes that are upsetting Europe, the French Revolution, the Enlightenment, are well understood by Salvatore Domenico Manetti, who leads the workshop in those years and who decides to send his son Luigi to get to know these events up close. Luigi himself, on his return to Florence in 1816, will mature the choice to transform the family workshop into a real company and gives it the name it still bears today (Giusto Manetti Battiloro) in honor of his son Giusto, born in 1818 Luigi leads the company towards an industrial modernization characterized by strong investments in the productive activity. Upon his death, the company passed to his son who, between 1800 and 1900, continued the innovation process started by his father and succeeded in establishing Giusto Manetti Battiloro as one of the great Italian industrial realities. Along with the investments, important recognitions also arrive, including the medal obtained on the occasion of the first national exhibition of 1861 held in Florence. The company prospers and when Giusto's son, Adolfo Manetti, takes over the company we are in the midst of the second industrial revolution. New tools arrive, such as steam hammers, and a new factory is built in via del Ponte alle Mosse. The employees become a hundred and the Manetti brand begins to be known on the European markets. The First World War interrupts the growth process. Giusto Manetti, Adolfo's son and Giusto's nephew, was among the young men called to the front who was wounded and captured by the Austrians in the battle of Monfalcone. In 1918, after having obtained a medal of valor for the courage shown during the conflict, he returned to Florence and, together with his brother-in-law Guido Macchia, resumed leadership of the company. Under his direction, the number of employees tripled and Manetti gold leaf began to shine on the most important monuments of the globe.

The Second World War hits the Manetti family and its business very hard again: Giusto Manetti was called up as a cavalry officer and on 2 July 1944 the Allies razed his factory to the ground, mistaking it for a warehouse in the nearby railway station of Porta al Prato.

== The reconstruction ==
Immediately after the end of the war, in 1946, Giusto Manetti rebuilt the factory together with his sons Lapo and Fabrizio and the workers. The company restarts and Giusto Manetti, by now recognized as one of the world's leading experts on gold leaf, is sought after all over the world for specialized consultancy concerning both the restoration of the Egyptian sarcophagi in the British Museum and the gilding of the space ogives.

In 1950 the first agreement was signed with an English goldbeater for the marketing and sale of films for hot foil printing. Thus was born the second company branch, which joins the historic production of gold leaf.

During the 1960s Manetti supplied her gold leaf for important works such as the Palace of Versailles, the halls of Windsor Castle, and the dome of the Basilica of the Holy Sepulcher in Jerusalem.

== The flood and the growth of the company ==
However, a new mishap struck the company when the flood in Florence on 4 November 1966 completely flooded the first floor of the factory, submerging most of the production machinery. Giusto's three children, Fabrizio, Lapo and Francesca, will be able to restart the company again and further expand its business with the acquisition of a new production plant in Florence (to which the printing business will be transferred to heat) and with the opening of two branches in Spain, in the city of Almería, and in Poland, in the city of Częstochowa. Once again Manetti gold leaf is used for important restorations in Italy and around the world: among many, the spiers of the New York Life Insurance Company skyscraper, the Tsarskoye Selo in St. Petersburg, the Gran Teatro La Fenice in Venice after the fire dated 29 January 1996 and the golden details of the Amerigo Vespucci school ship (sailing ship).

In 1996 the three brothers leave the management of the company to the new generation, made up of Bernardo, Lorenzo, Jacopo, Niccolò, Bonaccorso and Angelica. In 2013 Giusto Manetti Battiloro moved to the new 8,000 m^{2} factory in Campi Bisenzio, and achieved, again in 2013, a total turnover of 27 million Euros. As a sign of gratitude to the area in which it was born and raised, the company has sponsored the restoration of numerous historical assets of the city of Florence, including the ball by Andrea Verrocchio which surmounts the lantern of the dome of the cathedral of Santa Maria del Flower. It is a return to the origins of the family's history, which began precisely with the first restoration of the ball itself, carried out in 1602 by Matteo, the first Manetti goldbeater whose memory is preserved.

== Manetti today: the new factory ==
The new Giusto Manetti Battiloro factory, designed by the architect Baracchi and commissioned on 7 January 2013, brings together the three previous headquarters of the company in via del Ponte alle Mosse, via Panciatichi and via Petrocchi. Giusto Manetti Battiloro's new home was designed with human well-being and the quality of their work at the centre. For employees, in addition to the refectory, the relaxation area and the internal courtyards, there is a gym, a library for the free exchange of books, a large internal car park and an auditorium. This room, dedicated to the memory of Giusto Manetti, has a capacity of about fifty seats and was created both to train internal staff and for external training projects dedicated to students of art, restoration, design and architecture schools. Throughout the new headquarters, the furnishings, with warm tones and rigorously Made in Italy, are designed to put people at ease, while the technical equipment, among the most avant-garde, guarantees full safety for the worker and the highest quality for the product finished. Built in 18 months, the new factory is located in the Campi Bisenzio area, in the province of Florence, and has a covered area of approximately 8,000 m^{2}. The entire complex has been designed to maximize the amount of natural light in each office and laboratory, while the artificial LED lighting ensures significant energy savings. Again with a view to environmental sustainability, the roof of the headquarters was covered with 414 photovoltaic panels which, with a yield of approximately 120,000 kWh, avoid the emission of 60,000 kg of CO_{2} into the environment every year.
