= Think Pink (clothing) =

Italian sportswear brand

THINK PINK
- Industry: Clothing, accessories
- Founded: 1979
- Headquarters: Castiglione delle Stiviere, Italy
- Website: www.thinkpink.it

Think Pink is an Italian sportswear brand offering clothes and accessories, for men, women, and children founded in the late 1970s and come to success in the early eighties. Previously owned by the Tecnica Group., is now a trademark belonging to Man Socks Italia S.r.l.
