= List of companies of Italy =

Location of the Italian Republic (dark green) within the European Union (light green)

Italy is a unitary parliamentary republic in Europe with the third largest nominal GDP in the eurozone and the eighth largest in the world. As an advanced economy, the country also possesses the sixth largest national wealth and is ranked third for its central bank gold reserve. Italy has a very high level of human development and ranks sixth in the world for life expectancy.

== Largest firms ==
This list shows firms in the Fortune Global 500, which ranks firms by 2018 total revenues reported before 31 March 2019. Only the top five firms (if available) are included as a sample.

Rank	Image	Name	2018 revenues (US$M)	Employees	Notes
83		Eni	90,799	31,701	Oil and gas super major based in Rome. Subsidiaries include Agip (gas), Polimeri Europa (chemicals), and Saipem (oilfield services).
89		Enel	89,305	69,272	Multinational electricity and gas distribution. Subsidiaries include Endesa (Spain), Enel Américas (Chile) and Enel Green Power.
92		Assicurazioni Generali	88,157	70,734	Trieste-based full-line insurance firm and the third-largest insurance company in the world.
315		Intesa Sanpaolo	39,050	92,117	Multinational banking group formed from the merger of Banca Intesa and Sanpaolo IMI. Now the largest bank in Italy.
355		Poste Italiane	35,071	132,388	Primary Italian integrated postal and delivery services entity which also provides communication, logistics and financial services.

== Notable firms ==
This list includes notable companies with primary headquarters located in the country. The industry and sector follow the Industry Classification Benchmark taxonomy. Organizations which have ceased operations are included and noted as defunct.

Notable companies Status: P=Private, S=State; A=Active, D=Defunct
Name	Industry	Sector	Headquarters	Founded	Notes	Status	
A2A	Utilities	Multiutilities	Brescia	2008	Gas, water, electricity distribution	P	A
Abarth	Consumer goods	Automobiles	Turin	1949	Road and race cars, part of Stellantis	P	A
Aermacchi	Industrials	Aerospace	Varese	1912	Aircraft, defunct 2003, now Leonardo	P	D
Agip	Oil & gas	Oil & gas refining & marketing	Rome	1926	Former retail fuel marketing, merged in Eni	P	A
AgustaWestland	Industrials	Aerospace & defense	Rome	2000	Helicopters, part of Leonardo	P	A
AGV	Consumer goods	Auto parts	Alessandria	1946	Helmets, part of Dainese	P	A
Air Dolomiti	Consumer services	Airlines	Villafranca di Verona	1991	Regional airline, part of Lufthansa (Germany)	P	A
Air One	Consumer services	Airlines	Fiumicino	1983	Airline, defunct 2014, merged in Alitalia	P	D
ALAN	Consumer goods	Recreational products	Veggiano	1972	Bicycles	P	A
Alenia Aermacchi	Industrials	Aerospace	Venegono Superiore	2012	Defunct 2015, merged into Leonardo	P	D
Alenia Aeronautica	Industrials	Aerospace	Rome	1990	Defunct 2012, merged into Leonardo	P	D
Alessi	Consumer goods	Durable household products	Omegna	1921	Design objects, kitchenware	P	A
Alfa Romeo	Consumer goods	Automobiles	Turin	1910	Road and race cars, part of Stellantis	P	A
Alitalia	Consumer services	Airlines	Fiumicino	1999	Flag carrier, defunct 2020	P	D
Alleanza Assicurazioni	Financials	Life insurance	Milan	1898	Life insurance, part of Assicurazioni Generali	P	A
Alpinestars	Consumer goods	Clothing & accessories	Asolo	1963	Sportswear	P	A
Andrea Moda	Consumer goods	Clothing & accessories	Morrovalle	1985	Fashion	P	A
Angelini	Health care	Pharmaceuticals	Rome	1919	Pharmaceuticals	P	A
Anonima Petroli Italiana	Oil & gas	Petroleum products	Rome	1933	Petrochemical industry	P	A
Ansaldo Energia	Utilities	Conventional electricity	Genoa	1853	Power	P	A
Ansaldo STS	Industrials	Railroads	Genoa	2006	Railway signaling and support, part of Hitachi Rail (Japan)	P	A
Aprilia	Consumer goods	Automobiles	Noale	1945	Motorbikes, part of Piaggio	P	A
Arflex	Consumer goods	Furnishings	Milan	1947	Contemporary furniture	P	A
Armani	Consumer goods	Clothing & accessories	Milan	1975	Fashion house	P	A
Arnoldo Mondadori Editore	Consumer services	Publishing	Segrate	1907	Publishing house	P	A
Artemide	Consumer goods	Furnishings	Pregnana Milanese	1960	Design objects	P	A
Assicurazioni Generali	Financials	Full line insurance	Trieste	1831	Insurance	P	A
ATAC	Consumer services	Travel & tourism	Rome	1909	Public transport	S	A
Atala	Consumer goods	Recreational products	Monza	1921	Bicycles	P	A
Autobianchi	Consumer goods	Automobiles	Milan	1995	Automobiles, production ceased	P	D
Autogrill	Consumer services	Food retailers & wholesalers	Rozzano	1947	Catering	P	A
Avio	Industrials	Aerospace & defense	Rome	1908	Aerospace manufacturing	P	A
Azimut Yachts	Industrials	Shipbuilding	Turin	1969	Yachts	P	A
B Engineering	Consumer goods	Automobiles	Campogalliano	2000	Road cars	P	A
B&B Italia	Consumer goods	Furnishings	Novedrate	1966	Modern furniture	P	A
Baldinini	Consumer goods	Footwear	San Mauro Pascoli	1910	Shoes	P	A
Banca Carige	Financials	Banks	Genoa	1483	Bank, defunct 2021, part of BPER Banca	P	D
Banca Mediolanum	Financials	Banks	Basiglio	1997	Bank	P	A
Banca Monte dei Paschi di Siena	Financials	Banks	Siena	1472	Oldest operating bank in the world	P	A
Banca Nazionale del Lavoro	Financials	Banks	Rome	1913	Bank	P	A
Banca Popolare di Milano	Financials	Banks	Milan	1865	Bank, part of Banco BPM	P	A
Banco Popolare	Financials	Banks	Verona	2007	Bank, defunct 2016	P	D
Bandini Automobili	Consumer goods	Automobiles	Forlì	1946	Road and race cars, defunct 1992	P	D
Barilla Group	Consumer goods	Food products	Parma	1877	Food, pasta	P	A
Basso Bikes	Consumer goods	Recreational products	San Zenone degli Ezzelini	1977	Bicycles	P	A
Benelli Armi SpA	Industrials	Defense	Urbino	1967	Firearms	P	A
Benelli	Consumer goods	Automobiles	Pesaro	1911	Motorbikes, in 2005 sold to Qianjiang Motorcycle	P	A
Benetti	Industrials	Shipbuilding	Viareggio	1873	Shipbuilding	P	A
Benetton Group	Consumer goods	Clothing & accessories	Ponzano Veneto	1965	Fashion	P	A
Bennet	Consumer services	Food retailers & wholesalers	Montano Lucino	1964	Supermarkets	P	A
Beretta	Industrials	Defense	Brescia	1526	Firearms	P	A
Bertolli	Consumer goods	Food products	Lucca	1865	Food, olive oil, part of Unilever (UK/Netherlands)	P	A
Beta	Consumer goods	Automobiles	Rignano sull'Arno	1904	Motorbikes	P	A
Bettanin & Venturi	Consumer goods	Footwear	Vigasio	1994	Men's footwear	P	A
Bianchi	Consumer goods	Recreational products	Milan	1885	World's oldest bicycle manufacturer	P	A
Bimota	Consumer goods	Automobiles	Rimini	1973	Motorbikes	P	A
Birra Amarcord	Consumer goods	Brewers	Rimini	1997	Brewery	P	A
Birra Ichnusa	Consumer goods	Brewers	Assemini	1912	Brewery	P	A
Birra Menabrea	Consumer goods	Brewers	Biella	1846	Brewery	P	A
Birra Moretti	Consumer goods	Brewers	Udine	1859	Brewery, part of Heineken International (Netherlands)	P	A
Birrificio Angelo Poretti	Consumer goods	Brewers	Induno Olona	1877	Brewery, part of the Carlsberg Group (Denmark)	P	A
Bizzarrini	Consumer goods	Automobiles	Livorno	1964	Automobiles, defunct 1969	P	D
Blue Panorama Airlines	Consumer services	Airlines	Fiumicino	1998	Private airline	P	A
Blufin	Consumer goods	Clothing & accessories	Carpi	1977	Fashion house, Bluemarine	P	A
Bolton Group	Conglomerates	-	Milan	1978	Consumer goods, industrial goods	P	A
Bompiani	Consumer services	Publishing	Milan	1929	Publishing house	P	A
Bontoni	Consumer goods	Footwear	Montegranaro	2004	Men's shoes	P	A
Borrani	Consumer goods	Tires	Milan	1922	Wheels	P	A
Borsalino	Consumer goods	Clothing & accessories	Alessandria	1857	Hats	P	A
Bottecchia	Consumer goods	Recreational products	Cavarzere	1924	Bicycles, part of Fantic Motor	P	A
Bottega Veneta	Consumer goods	Clothing & accessories	Vicenza	1966	Fashion	P	A
B-P Battioni e Pagani S.p.A.	Industrials	Commercial vehicles & trucks	Parma	1959	Forklifts	P	A
Braccialini	Consumer goods	Clothing & accessories	Florence	1954	Leather accessories	P	A
Bracco Group	Health care	Pharmaceuticals	Milan	1927	Pharmaceuticals	P	A
Breda	Industrials	Industrial engineering	Brescia	1886	Defunct	P	D
Brembo	Consumer goods	Auto parts	Stezzano	1961	Automotive braking systems	P	A
Brioni	Consumer goods	Clothing & accessories	Rome	1945	Menswear, part of Kering (France)	P	A
Brionvega	Consumer goods	Consumer electronics	Pordenone	1945	Electronics, mobile phones	P	A
Brondi	Consumer goods	Consumer electronics	Turin	1935	Electronics, mobile phones	P	A
Brunello Cucinelli	Consumer goods	Clothing & accessories	Perugia	1978	Fashion	P	A
Bruno Magli	Consumer goods	Footwear	Bologna	1936	Shoes and leather goods	P	A
Buitoni	Consumer goods	Food products	Sansepolcro	1827	Food, pasta, part of Nestlé (Switzerland)	P	A
Bulgari	Consumer goods	Clothing & accessories	Rome	1884	Jewelry	P	A
Buzzi Unicem	Industrials	Building materials & fixtures	Casale Monferrato	1999	Cement, concrete	P	A
C.A.I. Second	Consumer services	Airlines	Fiumicino	2006	Airline, defunct 2015	P	D
Cagiva	Consumer goods	Automobiles	Varese	1978	Motorbikes, part of MV Agusta	P	A
Caltagirone Editore	Consumer services	Publishing	Rome	1999	Publishing house	P	A
Calzaturificio fratelli soldini	Consumer goods	Footwear	Capolona	1945	Shoes	P	A
Campagnolo	Consumer goods	Recreational products	Vicenza	1933	Bicycle supplies	P	A
Campari Group	Consumer goods	Beverages	Milan	1860	Drinks	P	A
Canali	Consumer goods	Clothing & accessories	Sovico	1934	Menswear	P	A
Candy	Consumer goods	Durable household products	Brugherio	1945	Appliances	P	A
Caraceni	Consumer goods	Clothing & accessories	Rome	1913	Clothing	P	A
Carpigiani	Consumer goods	Durable household products	Bologna	1944	Ice cream machines	P	A
Carrera Sunglasses	Consumer goods	Clothing & accessories	Padua	1956	Glasses	P	A
Carrozzeria Boneschi	Industrials	Commercial vehicles & trucks	Milan	1919	Coachbuilder	P	A
Carrozzeria Castagna	Industrials	Commercial vehicles & trucks	Milan	1849	Coachbuilder	P	A
Carrozzeria Ghia	Industrials	Commercial vehicles & trucks	Turin	1916	Coachbuilder, part of Ford Motor Company (US)	P	A
Carrozzeria Marazzi	Industrials	Commercial vehicles & trucks	Milan	1967	Coachbuilder	P	D
Carrozzeria Scaglietti	Industrials	Commercial vehicles & trucks	Modena	1951	Coachbuilder, defunct	P	D
Carrozzeria Touring	Industrials	Commercial vehicles & trucks	Milan	1926	Coachbuilder	P	A
Cassina S.p.A.	Consumer goods	Furnishings	Meda	1927	Furniture	P	A
Chicco	Consumer goods	Clothing & accessories	Como	1958	Children's items	P	A
Chiesi Farmaceutici S.p.A.	Health care	Pharmaceuticals	Parma	1935	Pharmaceuticals	P	A
Cinelli	Consumer goods	Recreational products	Milan	1948	Bicycles	P	A
Cinzano	Consumer goods	Distillers & vintners	Turin	1757	Drinks and spumante wine, part of Campari Group	P	A
Cirio	Consumer goods	Food products	San Lazzaro di Savena	1856	Food	P	A
Class Editori	Consumer services	Publishing	Milan	1986	Publisher	P	A
Colnago	Consumer goods	Recreational products	Cambiago	1952	Bicycles	P	A
Colotti Trasmissioni	Consumer goods	Auto parts	Modena	1958	Limited-slip differentials and transmissions	P	A
Columbus	Consumer goods	Recreational products	Settala	1919	Bicycle tubing	P	A
Comau	Industrials	Industrial machinery	Turin	1973	Industrial robots, part of FCA Italy	P	A
Conad	Consumer services	Food retailers & wholesalers	Bologna	1962	Supermarkets	P	A
Coop	Consumer services	Food retailers & wholesalers	Casalecchio di Reno	1967	Supermarkets	P	A
Coppola Industria Alimentare	Consumer goods	Food products	Mercato San Severino	1952	Canned tomatoes	P	A
Corneliani	Consumer goods	Clothing & accessories	Mantua	1958	Menswear	P	A
Costa Crociere	Consumer services	Travel & tourism	Genoa	1854	Cruise line	P	A
CRAI	Consumer services	Food retailers & wholesalers	Segrate	1973	Supermarkets	P	A
Dainese	Consumer goods	Auto parts	Molvena	1972	Helmets and protective equipment	P	A
Dallara	Consumer goods	Automobiles	Varano de' Melegari	1972	Race cars	P	A
Damiani	Consumer goods	Clothing & accessories	Valenza	1924	Jewelry	P	A
Danieli	Industrials	Industrial machinery	Buttrio	1914	Metals industry	P	A
Dario Pegoretti	Consumer goods	Recreational products	Caldonazzo	1956	Bicycles	P	A
Darling (sunscreen)	Consumer goods	Cosmetics	Modena	2018	Sunscreen	P	A
De Agostini	Consumer services	Publishing	Novara	1901	Media holding	P	A
De Cecco	Consumer goods	Food products	Fara San Martino	1886	Food, pasta	P	A
De Rosa	Consumer goods	Recreational products	Milan	1953	Bicycles	P	A
De Tomaso	Consumer goods	Automobiles	Modena	1959	Road cars, defunct 2015	P	D
Dell'Orto	Consumer goods	Auto parts	Cabiate	1933	Carburetors	P	A
DeLonghi	Consumer goods	Durable household products	Treviso	1902	Small appliances	P	A
Design42Day	Consumer services	Publishing	Milan	2007	Design publishing	P	A
Di Blasi Industriale	Consumer goods	Recreational products	Francofonte	1952	Bicycles	P	A
Diadora	Consumer goods	Footwear	Caerano di San Marco	1948	Shoes, part of Geox	P	A
Diesel	Consumer goods	Clothing & accessories	Breganze	1978	Fashion	P	A
Dolce & Gabbana	Consumer goods	Clothing & accessories	Milan	1985	Fashion house	P	A
DR Motor Company	Consumer goods	Automobiles	Macchia d'Isernia	2006	Road cars	P	A
Ducati	Consumer goods	Automobiles	Bologna	1926	Motorbikes, part of the Volkswagen Group (Germany)	P	A
Ducati Energia	Industrials	Electronic & electrical equipment	Bologna	1926	Automotive, energy, electronics	P	A
Durst	Technology	Electronic & electrical equipment	Brixen	1936	Photographic and printing equipment	P	A
Edison	Utilities	Multiutilities	Milan	1884	Electricity and natural gas, owned by EDF	P	A
Ellesse	Consumer goods	Clothing & accessories	Perugia	1959	Apparel, now part of Pentland Group (UK)	P	A
E. Marinella	Consumer goods	Clothing & accessories	Naples	1914	Clothing	P	A
Enel	Utilities	Multiutilities	Rome	1962	Electricity and natural gas	P	A
Energica Motor Company	Consumer goods	Automobiles	Modena	2010	Motorbikes	P	A
Eni	Oil & gas	Integrated oil & gas	Rome	1953	Petroleum	P	A
Erg	Utilities	Alternative electricity	Genoa	1938	Renewable energy	P	A
Ermenegildo Zegna	Consumer goods	Clothing & accessories	Milan	1910	Fashion house	P	A
Erreà	Consumer goods	Clothing & accessories	Torrile	1988	Sportswear	P	A
Esselunga	Consumer services	Food retailers & wholesalers	Milan	1957	Food retailer	P	A
Etro	Consumer goods	Clothing & accessories	Milan	1968	Fashion house	P	A
Eurofly	Consumer services	Airlines	Milan	1989	Defunct airline, merged in Meridiana	P	D
Fabbrica Ligure Automobili Genova	Consumer goods	Automobiles	Genoa	1905	Road cars, defunct 1908	P	D
Fratelli Fabbri Editori	Consumer services	Publishing	Milan	1947	Publishing house, part of RCS MediaGroup	P	A
Faema	Consumer goods	Durable household products	Milan	1945	Espresso machines	P	A
Falck Group	Basic materials	Iron & steel	Sesto San Giovanni	1906	Steel	P	A
FAMARS	Industrials	Defense	Gardone Val Trompia	1967	Firearms	P	A
Fantic Motor	Consumer goods	Automobiles	Barzago	1968	Motorbikes	P	A
Fedrigoni	Basic materials	Paper	Verona	1888	Paper	P	A
Feltrinelli	Consumer services	Publishing	Milan	1954	Publishing house	P	A
Fendi	Consumer goods	Clothing & accessories	Rome	1925	Luxury fashion	P	A
Ferrari	Consumer goods	Automobiles	Maranello	1939	Road and race cars	P	A
Ferrero SpA	Consumer goods	Food products	Alba	1946	Food	P	A
Ferretti Group	Industrials	Shipbuilding	Forlì	1968	Shipbuilding	P	A
Ferrovie dello Stato Italiane	Consumer services	Travel & tourism	Rome	1905	Passenger rail	S	A
Fiat	Consumer goods	Automobiles	Turin	1899	Automotive manufacturer, part of FCA Italy	P	A
F.I.L.A.	Consumer goods	Nondurable household products	Milan	1920	Writing instruments	P	A
Fincantieri	Industrials	Shipbuilding	Trieste	1959	Shipbuilding	P	A
Fiocchi Munizioni	Industrials	Defense	Lecco	1876	Ammunition	P	A
Fioravanti	Consumer goods	Automobiles	Turin	1987	Automotive design	P	A
Fondiaria-Sai	Financials	Property & casualty insurance	Turin	2002	Insurance, defunct 2014	P	D
Fondmetal	Consumer goods	Tires	Bergamo	1972	Wheels	P	A
Fornasari	Consumer goods	Automobiles	Vicenza	1999	Race cars	P	A
Forst	Consumer goods	Brewers	Algund	1857	Brewery	P	A
Franchi	Industrials	Defense	Brescia	1987	Firearms, part of Beretta Holding	P	A
Frera	Consumer goods	Automobiles	Milan	1905	Motorbikes, production ceased	P	D
Frette	Consumer goods	Clothing & accessories	Monza	1860	Textiles	P	A
Fulcrum Wheels	Consumer goods	Recreational products	Arcugnano	2004	Bicycle wheels, part of Campagnolo	P	A
Fulgor	Consumer goods	Durable household products	Gallarate	1949	Appliances	P	A
Furla	Consumer goods	Clothing & accessories	Bologna	1927	Fashion	P	A
Gaggia	Consumer goods	Durable household products	Milan	1947	Espresso machines, part of Philips (Netherlands)	P	A
Gancia	Consumer goods	Distillers & vintners	Canelli	1850	Spumante wine	P	A
Garelli Motorcycles	Consumer goods	Automobiles	Milan	1919	Scooters, production ceased	P	D
GDE Bertoni	Consumer goods	Recreational products	Milan	1938	Medals, trophies	P	A
GEDI Gruppo Editoriale	Consumer services	Publishing	Rome	1955	Media house	P	A
Geox	Consumer goods	Clothing & accessories	Montebelluna	1995	Clothing	P	A
Ghezzi & Brian	Consumer goods	Automobiles	Missaglia	1995	Motorbikes	P	A
Gilera	Consumer goods	Automobiles	Pontedera	1909	Scooters, motorbikes, production ceased	P	D
Gio. Ansaldo & C.	Industrials	Aerospace	Genoa	1853	Defunct 1993	P	D
Golden Goose	Consumer goods	Clothing & accessories	Venice	2000	Fashion	P	A
Graziano Trasmissioni	Consumer goods	Auto parts	Turin	1951	Transmissions, gear boxes and drivelines	P	A
Grimaldi Group	Transport & tourism	Consumer services	Palermo	1947	Tourist and cargo travel	P	A
Grivel	Consumer goods	Recreational products	Courmayeur	1818	Tools and equipment for alpinism	P	A
Grom	Consumer goods	Food products	Turin	2003	Ice cream	P	A
Gruppo Bertone	Consumer goods	Automobiles	Milan	1912	Automobile manufacturer, defunct 2014	P	D
Gruppo Riva	Basic materials	Iron & steel	Milan	1954	Steel	P	A
Gucci	Consumer goods	Clothing & accessories	Florence	1921	Fashion house	P	A
Guerciotti	Consumer goods	Recreational products	Milan	1964	Bicycles	P	A
Gufram	Consumer goods	Furnishings	Cuneo	1966	Design objects	P	A
Hera Group	Utilities	Multiutilities	Bologna	2002	Gas, water, electricity	P	A
I.DE.A Institute	Consumer goods	Automobiles	Turin	1978	Automotive design	P	A
Illy	Consumer goods	Beverages	Trieste	1933	Coffee	P	A
Impresa Pizzarotti	Industrials	Heavy construction	Parma	1910	Construction	P	A
Indesit	Consumer goods	Durable household products	Fabriano	1975	Appliances	P	A
Innocenti	Consumer goods	Automobiles	Milan	1947	Automobiles, defunct 1997	P	D
Intermarine	Industrials	Shipbuilding	Sarzana	1970	Shipbuilding	P	A
Intesa Sanpaolo	Financials	Banks	Turin	2007	Bank	P	A
Iride Bicycles	Consumer goods	Recreational products	Venice	1919	Bicycles	P	A
Iso	Consumer goods	Automobiles	Bresso	1953	Auto manufacturer, defunct 1974	P	D
Isotta Fraschini	Consumer goods	Automobiles	Milan	1900	Automotive manufacturer, part of Fincantieri	P	A
ITA Airways	Consumer services	Airlines	Rome	2020	Flag carrier	S	A
Italcementi	Industrials	Building materials & fixtures	Bergamo	1864	Concrete	P	A
Italdesign Giugiaro	Consumer goods	Automobiles	Moncalieri	1968	Automotive design, part of Volkswagen Group (Germany)	P	A
Italjet	Consumer goods	Automobiles	Castel San Pietro Terme	1959	Scooters, production ceased	P	D
Iveco	Industrials	Commercial vehicles & trucks	Turin	1975	Trucks, industrial & defense vehicles	P	A
Kappa	Consumer goods	Clothing & accessories	Turin	1916	Sportswear	P	A
Kiton	Consumer goods	Clothing & accessories	Naples	1956	Clothing	P	A
Krizia	Consumer goods	Clothing & accessories	Milan	1954	Designer label	P	A
Kuota	Consumer goods	Recreational products	Albiate	2001	Bicycles	P	A
La Perla	Consumer goods	Clothing & accessories	Bologna	1954	Clothing	P	A
La Rinascente	Consumer services	Broadline retailers	Milan	1865	Department stores	P	A
La Sportiva	Consumer goods	Footwear	Ziano di Fiemme	1928	Athletic footwear	P	A
Lagostina	Consumer goods	Durable household products	Omegna	1901	Kitchenwares	P	A
Lamborghini	Consumer goods	Automobiles	Sant'Agata Bolognese	1963	Road and race cars, part of the Volkswagen Group (Germany)	P	A
Lambretta	Consumer goods	Automobiles	Milan	1947	Scooters, defunct 1972	P	D
Lancia	Consumer goods	Automobiles	Turin	1906	Road and race cars, part of FCA Italy	P	A
Landi Renzo	Consumer goods	Auto parts	Cavriago	1954	Alternative fuel systems	P	A
Lavazza	Consumer goods	Beverages	Turin	1895	Coffee	P	A
Laverda	Consumer goods	Automobiles	Breganze	1873	Motorbikes, production ceased	P	D
Lechler	Basic materials	Specialty chemicals	Como	1858	Chemicals, paints, coatings	P	A
Legea	Consumer goods	Clothing & accessories	Pompei	1993	Sportswear	P	A
Leonardo	Industrials	Aerospace & defense	Rome	1948	Aerospace, defense electronics and security	P	A
Livingston Energy Flight	Consumer services	Airlines	Milan	1992	Airline, defunct 2010	P	D
Lloyd Italico	Financials	Insurance	Genoa	1917	Insurance, defunct 2016, part of Assicurazioni Generali	P	D
Loacker	Consumer goods	Food products	Ritten	1925	Snacks	P	A
Loro Piana	Consumer goods	Clothing & accessories	Quarona	1924	Clothing	P	A
Lotto Sport Italia	Consumer goods	Clothing & accessories	Treviso	1973	Sportswear	P	A
Luigi Borrelli	Consumer goods	Clothing & accessories	Naples	1957	Menswear	P	A
Luxottica	Consumer goods	Clothing & accessories	Milan	1961	Eyewear	P	A
Macron	Consumer goods	Clothing & accessories	Crespellano	1971	Sportswear	P	A
Magneti Marelli	Consumer goods	Auto parts	Corbetta	1919	Automobile components, part of Marelli Holdings (Japan)	P	A
Magni	Consumer goods	Automobiles	Samarate	1977	Motorbikes	P	A
Malaguti	Consumer goods	Automobiles	San Lazzaro di Savena	1930	Scooters, defunct 2011	P	D
Mandarina Duck	Consumer goods	Clothing & accessories	Bologna	1977	Part of E-Land Group (South Korea)	P	A
Manfrotto	Consumer goods	Recreational products	Cassola	1972	Photographic accessories and tripods	P	A
Manteco	Textiles	Recycled Fibers	Montemurlo	1943	High-end and recycled/low-impact wool fibers	P	A
Mapei	Industrials	Building materials & fixtures	Milan	1937	Building materials	P	A
Marni	Consumer goods	Clothing & accessories	Milan	1994	Fashion label	P	A
Martini & Rossi	Consumer goods	Distillers & vintners	Turin	1863	Vermouth drinks	P	A
Marzocchi	Consumer goods	Recreational products	Bologna	1949	Bicycle suspension components, part of Tenneco (US)	P	A
Marzotto	Consumer goods	Clothing & accessories	Valdagno	1836	Textiles	P	A
Maserati	Consumer goods	Automobiles	Modena	1914	Road and race cars, part of FCA Italy	P	A
Massimo Zanetti Beverage Group	Consumer goods	Beverages	Bologna	1973	Coffee	P	A
Max Mara	Consumer goods	Clothing & accessories	Reggio Emilia	1951	Fashion	P	A
MD Discount	Consumer services	Food retailers & wholesalers	Gricignano di Aversa	1994	Food retailer	P	A
Mediobanca	Financials	Banks	Milan	1946	Investment bank	P	A
Memphis Group	Industrials	Business support services	Milan	1982	Architecture, dismantled	P	D
Menarini	Health care	Pharmaceuticals	Florence	1886	Pharmaceuticals	P	A
Meridiana	Consumer services	Airlines	Olbia	1964	Private airline	P	A
Miche	Consumer goods	Recreational products	San Vendemiano	1919	Bicycles	P	A
Milano Assicurazioni	Financials	Property & casualty insurance	Milan	1825	Insurance, defunct 2013	P	D
Minarelli	Consumer goods	Auto parts	Calderara di Reno	1951	Motorbike engines, now part of Yamaha Motor Corporation (Japan)	P	A
Minardi	Consumer goods	Automobiles	Faenza	1979	Race cars, defunct 2005	P	D
Missoni	Consumer goods	Clothing & accessories	Varese	1953	Fashion	P	A
Miu Miu	Consumer goods	Clothing & accessories	Milan	1993	Fashion, part of Prada	P	A
Mivar	Consumer goods	Consumer electronics	Abbiategrasso	1945	Televisions	P	A
Moby Lines	Industrials	Marine transportation	Milan	1959	Ferries line	P	A
Momo	Consumer goods	Auto parts	Milan	1964	Racing accessories	P	A
Mondial	Consumer goods	Automobiles	Manerbio	1929	Motorbikes	P	A
Moon Boot	Consumer goods	Footwear	Giavera del Montello	1969	Snow boots	P	A
Morbidelli	Consumer goods	Automobiles	Pesaro	1960	Motorbikes, production ceased	P	D
Moretti Motor Company	Consumer goods	Automobiles	Turin	1925	Road cars	P	D
Moschino	Consumer goods	Clothing & accessories	Milan	1983	Fashion	P	A
Moto Guzzi	Consumer goods	Automobiles	Mandello del Lario	1921	Motorbikes, part of Piaggio	P	A
Moto Morini	Consumer goods	Automobiles	Bologna	1937	Motorbikes	P	A
Moto Rumi	Consumer goods	Automobiles	Bergamo	1949	Motorbikes, production ceased	P	D
Motobi	Consumer goods	Automobiles	Pesaro	1949	Motorbikes, production ceased	P	D
Motovario	Industrials	Industrial machinery	Formigine	1965	Engines, gear trains	P	D
Mutti	Consumer goods	Food products	Montechiarugolo	1899	Food	P	A
MV Agusta	Consumer goods	Automobiles	Varese	1945	Motorbikes	P	A
Nardi	Consumer goods	Automobiles	Turin	1932	Road and race cars	P	D
Natuzzi	Consumer goods	Furnishings	Santeramo in Colle	1959	Furniture and upholstery manufacturing	P	A
Neos	Consumer services	Airlines	Somma Lombardo	2001	Leisure airline	P	A
New Holland Construction	Industrials	Commercial vehicles & trucks	Turin	1895	Construction machinery	P	A
Nordica	Consumer goods	Clothing & accessories	Giavera del Montello	1939	Sportswear	P	A
Novarossi	Consumer goods	Recreational products	Monticelli Brusati	1984	Glowplug engine	P	A
Nuova Cometra	Industrials	Commercial rail vehicles	Pace del Mela	1999	Railway vehicles	P	A
Nuovo Banco Ambrosiano	Financials	Banks	Milan	1982	Bank, defunct 1989	P	D
OSCA	Consumer goods	Automobiles	San Lazzaro di Savena	1947	Automobiles, production ceased 1967	P	D
Officine Meccaniche	Industrials	Commercial vehicles & trucks	Milan	1918	Trucks, production ceased 1975	P	D
Olidata	Technology	Software	Cesena	1982	Softwares	P	A
Olivetti	Consumer goods	Consumer electronics	Ivrea	1908	Electronics, mobile phones, part of TIM Group	P	A
OMAS	Consumer goods	Nondurable household products	Bologna	1925	Pens, office accessories, defunct 2016	P	D
OMP Racing	Consumer goods	Auto parts	Ronco Scrivia	1973	Racing wear and car equipment	P	A
Onda Mobile Communication	Technology	Telecommunications equipment	Roveredo in Piano	2003	Mobile phones, bankrupt, now merged into ONDA TLC	P	D
Osella	Consumer goods	Automobiles	Verolengo	1965	Race cars	P	A
Ostoni	Consumer goods	Durable household products	Cormano	1958	Pasta machines	P	A
OTO Melara	Industrials	Defense	Rome	1905	Defense, defunct 2015, now Leonardo	P	D
OZ Group	Consumer goods	Tires	San Martino di Lupari	1971	Wheels	P	A
Pagani	Consumer goods	Automobiles	San Cesario sul Panaro	1992	Road cars	P	A
Paglieri	Consumer goods	-	Alessandria	1876	Industrial goods	P	A
Pal Zileri	Consumer goods	Clothing & accessories	Vicenza	1980	Menswear	P	A
Panerai	Consumer goods	Clothing & accessories	Milan	1860	Watches	P	A
Parmalat	Consumer goods	Food products	Collecchio	1961	Dairy goods and snacks, owned by Lactalis	P	A
Partenavia	Industrials	Aerospace	Arzano	1957	Aircraft, defunct 1998	P	D
Pastiglie Leone	Consumer goods	Food products	Turin	1857	Candies and sweets	P	A
Paton	Consumer goods	Automobiles	Settimo Milanese	1958	Motorbikes	P	A
Peg Perego	Consumer goods	Durable household products	Arcore	1949	Juvenile products	P	A
Perazzi	Industrials	Defense	Brescia	1957	Firearms	P	A
Perfetti Van Melle	Consumer goods	Food products	Lainate/Breda	2001	Confectionery and gum	P	A
Perini Navi	Industrials	Shipbuilding	Viareggio	1983	Yachts	P	A
Permasteelisa	Industrials	Heavy construction	Vittorio Veneto	1973	Construction and engineering	P	A
Persol	Consumer goods	Clothing & accessories	Agordo	1917	Eyewear	P	A
Perugina	Consumer goods	Food products	Perugia	1907	Confectionery, part of Nestlé (Switzerland)	P	A
Piaggio Aerospace	Industrials	Aerospace & defense	Genoa	1884	Aerospace manufacturing	P	A
Piaggio	Consumer goods	Automobiles	Pontedera	1884	Scooters	P	A
Pinarello	Consumer goods	Recreational products	Treviso	1952	Bicycles, part of Catterton Partners (US)	P	A
Pininfarina	Consumer goods	Automobiles	Cambiano	1930	Car body styling, part of Mahindra Group (India)	P	A
Pirelli	Consumer goods	Tires	Milan	1872	Tires	P	A
Pogliaghi	Consumer goods	Recreational products	Milan	1947	Bicycles	P	D
Police	Consumer goods	Clothing & accessories	Venice	1983	Fashion	P	A
Poste Air Cargo	Consumer services	Airlines	Rome	1981	Cargo airline, part of Poste italiane	S	A
Poste italiane	Industrials	Delivery services	Rome	1862	Postal services	S	A
Prada	Consumer goods	Clothing & accessories	Milan	1913	Fashion	P	A
Prinetti & Stucchi	Consumer goods	Recreational products	Milan	1901	Bicycles	P	D
Pris-Mag	Industrials	Construction equipment	Vimercate	1975	Loaders, dump trucks	P	A
Prysmian Group	Industrials	Electrical components & equipment	Milan	2011	Electrical cable	P	A
RAI	Consumer services	Broadcasting & entertainment	Rome	1924	State media	S	A
Rancilio	Consumer goods	Durable household products	Parabiago	1927	Espresso machines	P	A
Ray-Ban	Consumer goods	Clothing & accessories	Milan	1936	Glasses	P	A
RCS MediaGroup	Consumer services	Publishing	Milan	1927	Publishing group	P	A
Rifle	Consumer goods	Clothing & accessories	Prato	1958	Fashion	P	A
Rizzani de Eccher	Industrials	Heavy construction	Pozzuolo del Friuli	1831	General contractor	P	A
Sabelt	Consumer goods	Auto parts	Turin	1972	Racing accessories	P	A
Saeco	Consumer goods	Durable household products	Bologna	1981	Espresso machines, part of Philips (Netherlands)	P	A
SAES Getters	Industrials	Advanced materials	Lainate	1940	Technologies for advanced materials, including OLED manufacturing processes and more	P	A
Safilo	Consumer goods	Clothing & accessories	Padua	1934	Eyewear	P	A
Salvatore Ferragamo S.p.A.	Consumer goods	Clothing & accessories	Florence	1928	Fashion	P	A
San Pellegrino	Consumer goods	Beverages	San Pellegrino Terme	1899	Mineral water, part of Nestlé (Switzerland)	P	A
Saras S.p.A.	Oil & gas	Oil & gas exploration & production	Sarroch	1962	Petroleum	P	A
SDF Group	Industrials	Machinery: agricultural	Treviglio	1927	Agricultural machinery	P	A
Seleco	Consumer goods	Consumer electronics	Milan	1965	Televisions	P	A
Selex ES	Industrials	Aerospace	Rome	2013	Defunct 2015, now Leonardo	P	D
Sergio Rossi	Consumer goods	Footwear	Milan	1966	Footwear	P	A
Sofidel	Consumer goods	Personal care	Porcari	1966	Tissue paper	P	A
Siae Microelettronica	Technology	Telecommunications equipment	Cologno Monzese	1952	Network equipment	P	A
SIAI-Marchetti	Industrials	Aerospace	Sesto Calende	1915	Aircraft, defunct 1983	P	D
Sicom test	Technology	Telecommunications equipment	Trieste	2003	Test and certification	P	A
Simmel Difesa	Industrials	Defense	Colleferro	1948	Ammunition	P	A
Smeg	Consumer goods	Durable household products	Guastalla	1948	Appliances	P	A
Snam	Utilities	Gas distribution	San Donato Milanese	1941	Gas infrastructure	P	A
SNAV	Industrials	Marine transportation	Naples	1958	Ferries line, part of Mediterranean Shipping Company (Switzerland)	P	A
Società Generale Immobiliare	Financials	Real estate holding & development	Rome	1862	Developer	P	A
Società Torinese Automobili Rapid	Consumer goods	Automobiles	Turin	1904	Defunct 1921	P	D
Soilmec	Industrials	Commercial vehicles & trucks	Cesena	1969	Construction equipment	P	A
Somec	Consumer goods	Recreational products	Lugo	1973	Bicycles	P	A
Sparco	Consumer goods	Auto parts	Volpiano	1977	Racing gear	P	A
Suomy	Consumer goods	Auto parts	Inverigo	1997	Helmets	P	A
Superga	Consumer goods	Footwear	Turin	1911	Shoes	P	A
Tanfoglio	Industrials	Defense	Gardone Val Trompia	1948	Firearms	P	A
Techint	Conglomerates	-	Milan	1945	Steel, machinery, oil & gas, mining, co-headquartered in Buenos Aires (Argentina)	P	A
Technogym	Consumer goods	Recreational products	Cesena	1983	Fitness equipment	P	A
Telecom Italia	Telecommunications	Telephony	Rome	1994	Telecom	P	A
Terra Modena	Consumer goods	Automobiles	Modena	2015	Motorbikes	P	A
Tirrenia	Industrials	Marine transportation	Naples	1936	Ferries line	P	A
Tod's	Consumer goods	Clothing & accessories	Sant'Elpidio a Mare	1920	Fashion	P	A
Trussardi	Consumer goods	Clothing & accessories	Milan	1911	Fashion	P	A
Tuaca	Consumer goods	Distillers & vintners	Livorno	1938	Brandy, part of Sazerac Company (US)	P	A
UBI Banca	Financials	Banks	Bergamo	2003	Banking	P	A
UniCredit	Financials	Banks	Milan	1998	Banking	P	A
Unipol	Financials	Banks	Bologna	1963	Banking	P	A
UnoAErre	Consumer goods	Clothing & accessories	Arezzo	1926	Jewelry	P	A
Valentino SpA	Consumer goods	Clothing & accessories	Milan	1960	Fashion	P	A
Versace	Consumer goods	Clothing & accessories	Milan	1978	Fashion house	P	A
Vespa	Consumer goods	Automobiles	Pontedera	1946	Scooters, part of Piaggio	P	A
VF Venieri	Industrials	Commercial vehicles & trucks	Lugo	1948	Heavy equipment	P	A
Viberti	Consumer goods	Automobiles	Pescara	1922	Motorbikes, production ceased	P	D
Vibram	Consumer goods	Footwear	Albizzate	1937	Footwear	P	A
Vignale	Industrials	Commercial vehicles & trucks	Turin	1948	Coachbuilder, part of Ford Motor Company (US)	P	A
VM Motori	Consumer goods	Auto parts	Cento	1947	Diesel engines	P	A
Voiello	Consumer goods	Food products	Torre Annunziata	1879	Food, pasta	P	A
Vyrus	Consumer goods	Automobiles	Coriano	2001	Motorbike	P	A
Webuild	Industrials	Heavy construction	Milan	2014	Industrial group	P	A
Wilier Triestina	Consumer goods	Recreational products	Rossano Veneto	1906	Bicycles	P	A
YOOX Net-a-Porter Group	Consumer services	Clothing & accessories	Milan	2015	Fashion	P	A
Zagato	Industrials	Commercial vehicles & trucks	Rho	1919	Coachbuilder	P	A
Zambon	Health care	Pharmaceuticals	Bresso	1906	Pharmaceuticals	P	A
Zanussi	Consumer goods	Durable household products	Pordenone	1916	Appliances, part of Electrolux (Sweden)	P	A

== See also ==
- List of largest Italian companies
- Economy of Italy
- List of Italian telephone companies
- Automotive industry in Italy
- List of Italian brands
