= List of largest Italian companies =

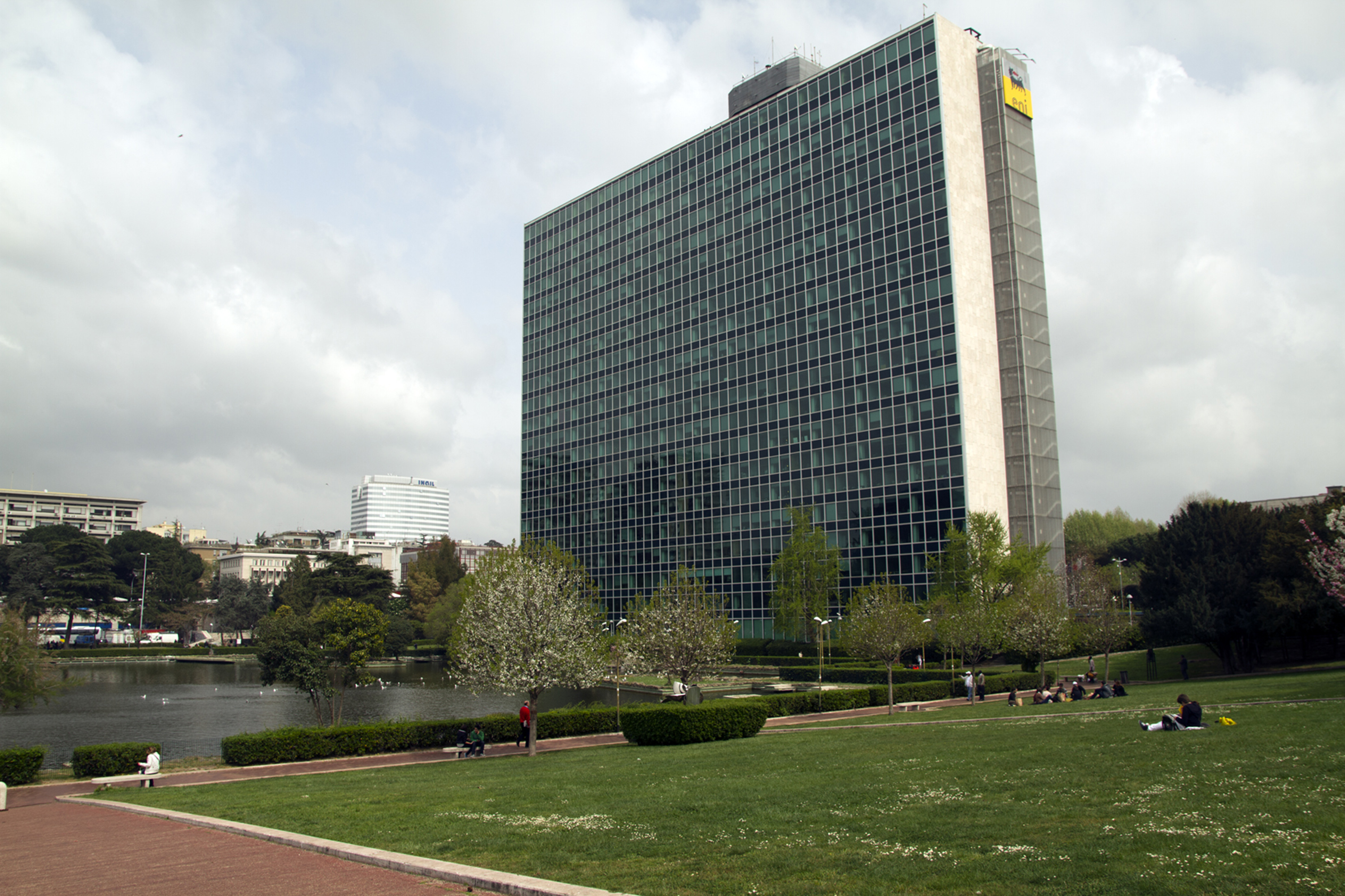
Eni is considered one of the world's oil and gas "Supermajors".

This article lists the largest companies in Italy in terms of their revenue, net profit, and total assets, according to the American business magazines Fortune and Forbes, and the United Kingdom-based B2B data provider Global Database.

== 2023 Fortune list ==
This list displays the all 23 Italian companies in the Fortune Europe 500, which ranks the largest companies in Europe by annual revenue. The figures below are given in millions of US dollars and are for the fiscal year 2022. Also listed are the headquarters location, net profit and industry sector of each company.

Rank	Name	Industry	Revenue (USD millions)	Profits (USD millions)	Employees	Headquarters
1	Enel	Utilities	147,790	1,769	65,124	Rome
2	Eni	Oil and gas	140,607	14,606	32,188	Rome
3	Assicurazioni Generali	Insurance	85,750	3,063	82,061	Trieste
4	Intesa Sanpaolo	Finance	38,526	4,579	95,574	Turin
5	Poste italiane	Logistics	33,528	1,584	121,033	Rome
6	UniCredit	Banking	28,531	6,792	75,040	Milan
7	A2A	Utilities	24,365	422	13,655	Brescia
8	Hera Group	Utilities	21,698	268	9,415	Bologna
9	Prysmian Group	Electric Cables	16,941	530	30,021	Milan
10	Telecom Italia	Telecommunications	16,829	-3,076	50,392	Rome, Milan and Naples
11	Saras	Energy	16,655	439	1,576	Milan
12	Unipol	Financial services	15,759	718	11,353	Bologna
13	Leonardo	Aerospace and defense	15,475	975	50,034	Rome
14	Ferrovie dello Stato Italiane	Railway	14,371	215	82,998	Rome
15	Saipem	Oil and gas	11,010	-220	31,394	Milan
16	Acquirente Unico	Utilities	10,883	0	323	Rome
17	Webuild	Construction	8,501	10	35,994	Milan
18	Gruppo Iren	Utilities	8,270	238	10,583	Reggio Emilia
19	Fincantieri	Shipbuilding	7,869	-325	20,792	Rome
20	Pirelli	Automotive	7,306	439	31,214	Milan
21	ICCREA Banca	Banking	6,279	1,880	22,144	Rome
22	Nexi	Financial technology	5,710	147	10,221	Milan
23	Banco BPM	Banking	5,624	738	19,279	Milan and Verona

== 2024 Global Database list ==
This list is based on the Global Database, which ranks the largest publicly traded companies in Italy. The ranking considers reported 2024 financial results, including revenue, operating income, net income, total assets, and total equity for each company. The table below also lists the headquarters location and industry sector of each company. The figures represent the latest available data for the financial year 2023/24. The 20 highest ranked companies from Italy are listed.

Rank	Name	Headquarters	Revenue (billions €)	Operating income (billions €)	Net income (billions €)	Total assets (billions €)	Total equity (billions €)	Industry
1	Assicurazioni Generali	Trieste	95.19	7.295	3.724	710.0		Insurance
2	ENI	Rome	88.80	5.238	2.62	146.9	55.6	Energy
3	Enel	Rome	78.95	15.494	7.016	187.14	49.17	Utilities
4	Intesa Sanpaolo	Turin	21.47	21.47	4.35	943.452		Banking
5	UniCredit	Milan	24.84	15.439	9.719	860.3	64.4	Banking
6	Leonardo	Rome	17.76	1.271	1.159	33.67	10.2	Aerospace, Defense & Security
7	Poste Italiane	Rome	12.6	2.96	2.0	146.5	14.3	Postal & Financial Services

== 2024 Forbes list ==
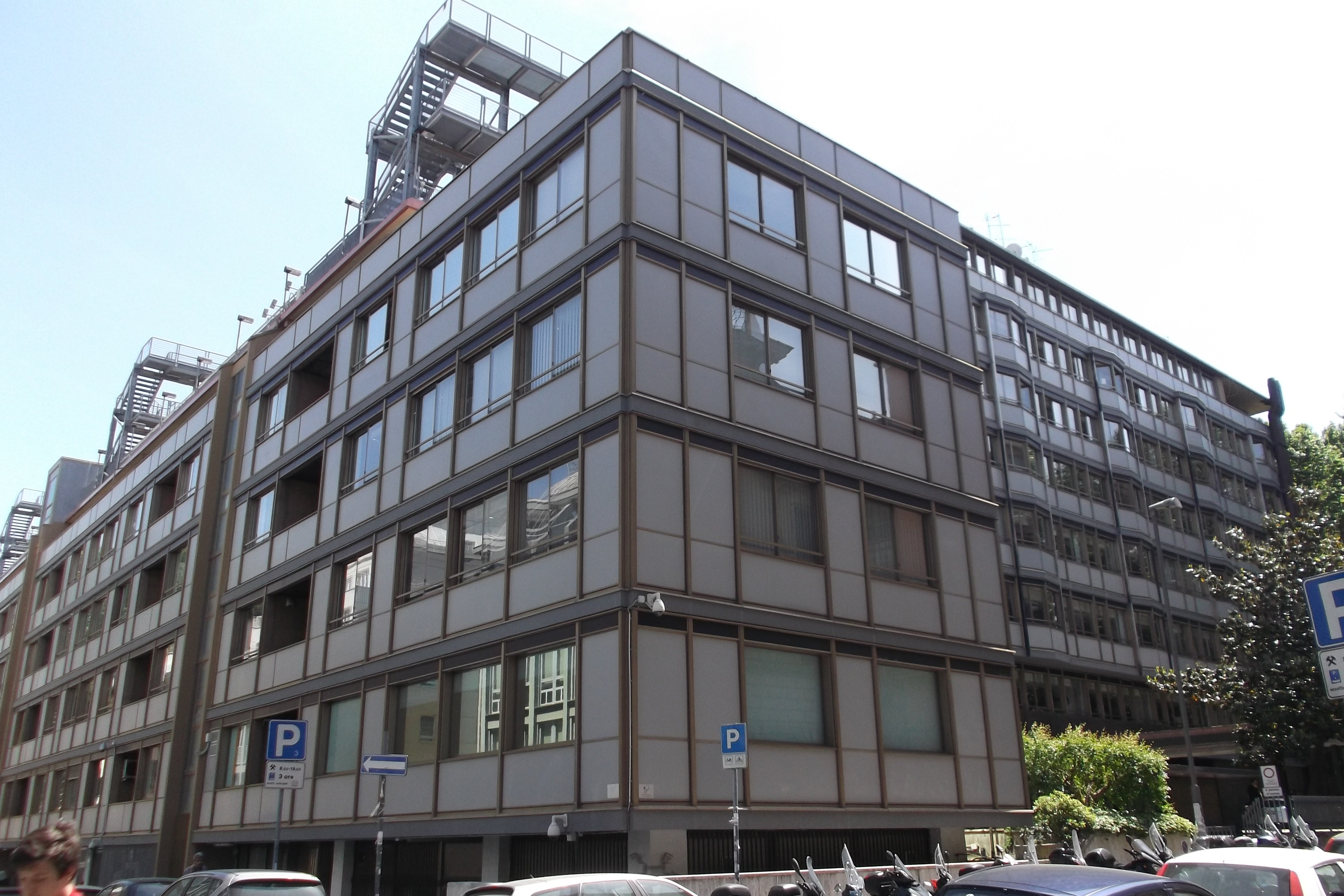
Enel's headquarters in Rome

This list is based on the Forbes Global 2000, which ranks the world's 2,000 largest publicly traded companies. The Forbes list takes into account a multitude of factors, including the revenue, net profit, total assets and market value of each company; each factor is given a weighted rank in terms of importance when considering the overall ranking. The table below also lists the headquarters location and industry sector of each company. The figures are in billions of US dollars and are for the fiscal year 2023. All 28 Italian companies in the Forbes 2000 are listed.

Rank	Forbes 2000 rank	Name	Headquarters	Revenue (billions US$)	Profit (billions US$)	Assets (billions US$)	Value (billions US$)	Industry
1	84	Intesa Sanpaolo	Turin	42.2	9.1	1,006.1	74.8	Finance
2	94	Enel	Rome	96.0	4.7	209.8	75.1	Utilities
3	129	UniCredit	Milan	26.5	10.8	875.4	66.4	Banking
4	141	Assicurazioni Generali	Trieste	74.7	4.0	555.3	42.0	Insurance
5	151	Eni	Rome	97.0	3.9	158.3	50.4	Oil and gas
6	385	Poste italiane	Rome	22.2	2.0	293.2	17.4	Logistics
7	712	Banco BPM	Milan and Verona	9.6	1.4	223.3	11.0	Banking
8	823	Unipol Gruppo	Bologna	14.1	1.2	86.6	7.2	Insurance
9	824	BPER Banca	Modena	8.1	1.8	151.3	8.1	Banking
10	836	Leonardo	Rome	16.5	0.7	33.9	14.6	Aerospace and defense
11	870	Mediobanca	Milan	5.4	1.2	104.8	13.9	Banking
12	893	Banca MPS	Siena	6.7	2.2	135.5	7.3	Banking
13	962	Ferrari	Amsterdam and Maranello	6.6	1.4	9.3	76.0	Automotive
14	1001	Snam	San Donato Milanese	4.6	1.2	37.1	16.5	Oil and gas
15	1125	Banca Mediolanum	Basiglio	3.1	0.9	85.4	8.8	Insurance
16	1140	Terna	Rome	3.4	1.0	25.9	17.1	Utilities
17	1147	Telecom Italia	Rome and Milan	17.6	-1.6	68.7	5.7	Telecommunication
18	1156	Prysmian Group	Milan	16.3	0.6	14.6	16.8	Electric Cables
19	1257	A2A	Brescia	13.8	0.9	19.4	6.9	Utilities
20	1363	FinecoBank	Milan and Reggio Emilia	1.9	0.7	36.8	10.4	Banking
21	1387	Credito Emiliano	Reggio Emilia	3.5	0.6	71.0	3.7	Banking
22	1492	Prada	Milan	5.1	0.7	8.4	19.8	Luxury goods
23	1516	Banca Popolare di Sondrio	Sondrio	2.9	0.6	61.3	4.0	Banking
24	1547	Iveco	Milan	17.5	0.2	19.9	3.4	Automotive
25	1565	Moncler	Milan	3.2	0.7	5.5	18.8	Luxury goods
26	1813	Hera Group	Bologna	13.6	0.4	16.0	5.4	Utilities
27	1856	Nexi	Milan	6.4	-1.1	29.1	9.0	Financial technology
28	1970	Buzzi Unicem	Casale Monferrato	4.7	1.0	8.4	8.1	Building materials

== See also ==
- List of companies of Italy
- List of companies by revenue
