= Day Is Done =

Day Is Done may refer to:

- "Day Is Done" (song), a 1969 song by Peter, Paul and Mary
- Day Is Done (album), a 2005 album by Brad Mehldau
- "Taps" (bugle call), sometimes known as "Day Is Done", from the first line of the lyric
- "Day Is Done," a song by Nick Drake from Five Leaves Left
- "Day Is Done", a song by John Prine from Lost Dogs and Mixed Blessings
- Day Is Done, an experimental film directed by Mike Kelley
- Day Is Done (film), 2011 film
- Day Is Done, a 1970 book by Herbert Leslie Gee
- "The Day Is Done", a 1939 sci-fi story by Lester del Rey
- Day Is Done, a bicycle steel frame model by Dario Pegoretti

== See also ==
- "Until the Day Is Done", a song by R.E.M.
- "That Day Is Done", a track from Paul McCartney's album Flowers in the Dirt
- "When Day Is Done", a 1927 song by Buddy DeSylva and Robert Katscher and heard as a track on Coleman Hawkins' album The Hawk Relaxes; previously recorded by Django Reinhardt, Paul Whiteman and Bing Crosby
- "When the Day Is Done", a song by The Legends on the soundtrack of the film Wicker Park
- Day Is Gone, a song and extended play by Cardiacs
