= Iride Bicycles =

Italian bicycle company

- Company type: Private
- Industry: Bicycle industry
- Founded: 1919; 107 years ago, Teglio Veneto
- Founder: Umberto Gemmati
- Headquarters: Teglio Veneto, Italy
- Area served: Worldwide
- Key people: Carlo Gemmati
- Products: Bicycles and Bicycle frame
- Website: iridecicli.it

Iride Bicycles is a brand of bicycles manufactured at the Gemmati Velocipedi factory, near the city of Venice, in the town of Teglio Veneto in northern Italy. It was established in 1919. The trademark was originated by Umberto Gemmati and continues to be produced by his grandson, Carlo Gemmati. The word iride refers to the spectrum of colors in the champion flag, and is pronounced like the root of the word iridescent.

== History ==
Iride had a race winning heyday during the 1940s, 1950s, and 1960s. Victories on road courses and velodromes were made by notable racers including Nino Florean. The office of the factory displays many trophies. The nearby Mecchia velodrome, in Portogruaro, is featured in historical photos of the racers.

The company is best known for producing hand-brazed lugged steel frame bikes using primarily Columbus tubing, also Oria tubing; and mainly utilizing Miche components because of the high performance and the fact that they are close by in San Vendemiano. The Iride workshop pays special attention to finish, using a large powder coating oven. Gemmati Velocipedi also uses imported aluminum frames and Italian components to make a range of more ordinary bicycles including (what Americans would call a hybrid) their popular City Bike.

== Bicycles ==
The Robb Report called Iride "The Maserati of Bicycles" for the similar history of the two brands: early race success, uncomplicated classic Italian design, up to current manufacture of premium road vehicles.

Iride is also grouped with "top bike makers" in Barron's, and called "nimble" in Details. Iride bicycles have been available in North America since 2010.

== See also ==
- List of bicycle parts
- List of Italian companies
