= Amarcord Brewery =

Italian brewing company

Coordinates: 43.5793059°N 12.452697°E

Amarcord Brewery (Birra Amarcord)
- Type: Craft
- Location: Rimini, Italy
- Opened: 1997
- Owned by: BIRRA AMARCORD S.p.A.
- Website: birraamarcord.it

Amarcord Brewery (Birra Amarcord), is a brewing company, founded in Rimini in Emilia Romagna, Italy in 1997. Although the registered office is in Rimini, their brewery is located in Apecchio.

== Awards ==
=== International Beer Challenge 2011 ===
• Riserva Speciale – silver medal

== See also ==
- List of companies of Italy
