= Onda Mobile Communication =

Onda
- Type: Private
- Industry: Telecommunications
- Founded: Roveredo in Piano, Italy
- Fate: Bankrupt
- Headquarters: Roveredo in Piano, Italy
- Products: Cellular phones
- Website: www.ondacommunication.com (not active)

Onda Communication S.p.A. was an Italian cellular phone manufacturer.

== Overview ==
The company's headquarters was in Roveredo in Piano (PN) with subsidiaries in Rome (Italy) and in Nanjing (China).

Telecom Italia was a major distributor of Onda handsets.

ONDA Brand is now adopted by ONDA TLC, a new company distributing senior phones and rugged phones.

== Products ==
=== Mobile Phones ===
- N1000iB
- N1010
- N1020
- N1030
- N2020
- N2030
- N3000
- N3020
- N3030
- N4000
- N4000i
- N4020
- N5000
- N5020

=== WIFI ===
- DUAL MODE Card N500DH
- EDGE Card N100E
- EDGE Card N775
- UMTS Card N300U
