= ALAN =

Italian bicycle manufacturer

Coordinates: 45.4108139°N 11.7220846°E

- Type: Private
- Industry: Bicycle industry
- Founded: 1972; 54 years ago in Saccolongo, Italy
- Founder: Falconi Lodovico
- Headquarters: Veggiano, Italy
- Area served: Worldwide
- Products: Bicycles and Bicycle frames
- Website: alanbike.it

ALAN is an Italian bicycle manufacturer.

== History ==
ALAN was founded in 1972 by Falconi Lodovico, an engineer who had worked for bicycle manufacturer Torpado. The name ALAN comes from the first two letters of Lodovico's children, Alberto and Annamaria. It was the first company to introduce an all aluminium bicycle frame made from aerospace grade aluminum.

In 1976, ALAN was again first in developing and manufacturing a production carbon frame made by bonding Torayca carbon fibre composite tubing to cast aluminium lugs. This is a process still widely used today by many manufacturers.

Over the years the firm's frames were ridden to 20 cyclo-cross world championships titles, 5 track world championships titles, numerous one-day classics wins, as well as Grand Tour stage wins.

== See also ==
- List of bicycle parts
- List of Italian companies
