= OMP Racing =

Italian motorsports manufacturer

OMP Racing SpA
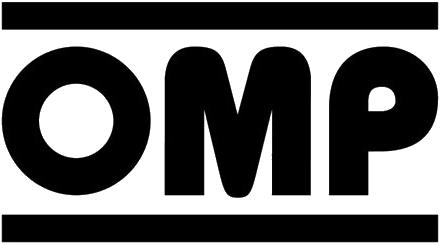
- Industry: Automotive
- Founded: 1973; 53 years ago in Genoa
- Headquarters: Ronco Scrivia, Italy
- Products: Safety equipments for motorsport and racing car accessories
- Website: ompracing.com

OMP Racing Spa (Officine Meccaniche Percivale) is a manufacturer of motorsport safety equipment and racing car accessories founded in 1973 and based in the area of Genoa, Italy.

== History ==
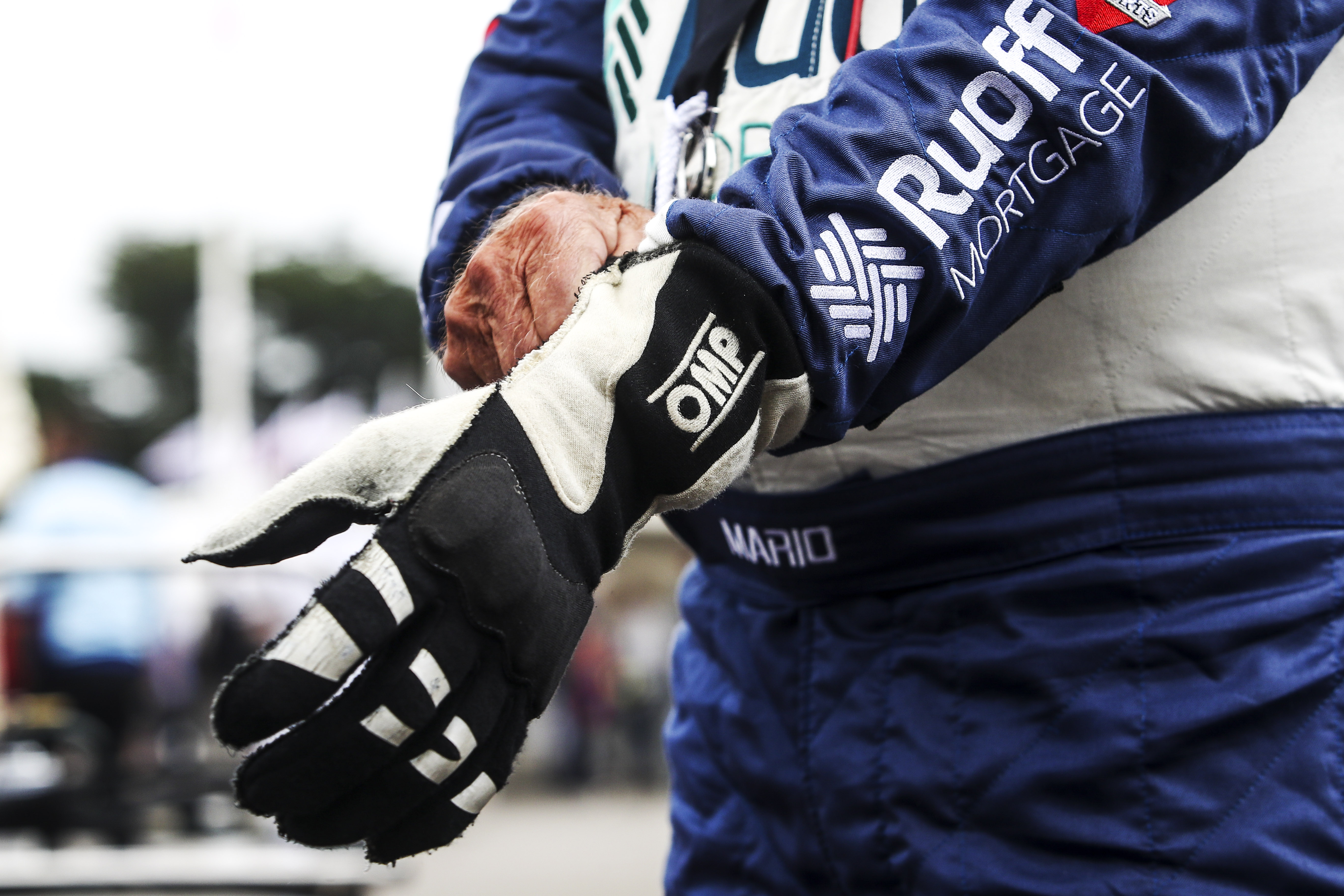
Racing gloves by OMP

The OMP Racing Spa company was founded in 1973 by three brothers: Claudio, Piergiorgio and Roberto Percivale. It initially produced only rally car accessories such as rollbars and tailpipes. In the 1980s, the company began producing equipment for drivers (suits, gloves, boots, helmets etc.). Since 2008, the company's majority share is owned by brothers Paolo and Alberto Delprato.

On 11 December 2019, OMP Racing announced that it had acquired the majority shares in Bell Racing Helmets Group.

== Sponsorships ==
=== Current ===
As of 2025:

Formula 1

- (Germany) Mercedes-AMG Petronas Formula One Team
- (Germany) Revolut Audi F1 Team

Formula 2

- (France) DAMS Lucas Oil (Jak Crawford)

==== World Rally Championship ====
- (Japan) Toyota Gazoo Racing

==== FIA World Endurance Championship ====
- (France) Akkodis ASP Team
- (Italy) Iron Lynx

Formula E

- (United States) Cupra Kiro
- (United Kingdom) Envision Racing
- (India) Mahindra Racing

==== IndyCar Series ====
- (United States) Team Penske
- (United States) Dale Coyne Racing
- (Argentina) (United States) Juncos Hollinger Racing

=== Past ===
Throughout its history, OMP has had sponsorship deals with the following race drivers:

==== Formula One ====
- (Brazil) Ayrton Senna
- (Germany) Michael Schumacher
- (Austria) Gerhard Berger
- (Finland) Mika Häkkinen
- (Italy) Riccardo Patrese
- (Italy) Mauro Baldi
- (United Kingdom) Nigel Mansell
- (Finland) Keke Rosberg
- (United Kingdom) Martin Brundle
- (Italy) Alessandro Nannini
- (United Kingdom) Damon Hill
- (Italy) (United States) Mario Andretti
- (France) Jean Alesi
- (United Kingdom) David Coulthard
- (Brazil) Bruno Senna
- (Brazil) Rubens Barrichello
- (Australia) Mark Webber
- (United Kingdom) Eddie Irvine
- (Finland) Kimi Räikkönen

==== World Rally Championship ====
- (Finland) Henri Toivonen
- (Finland) Markku Alen
- (Sweden) Björn Waldegård
- (Italy) Alex Fiorio
- (Finland) Juha Kankkunen
- (Spain) Carlos Sainz
- (Finland) Tommi Mäkinen
- (France) Didier Auriol
- (United Kingdom) Richard Burns

==== World Touring Car Championship ====
- (France) Yvan Muller
- (United Kingdom) Robert Huff

== See also ==
- List of Italian companies
