= Frera =

Italian motorcycle brand (1905–1936)

- Industry: Transport
- Founded: 1905, Tradate, Italy
- Founder: Corrado Frera
- Defunct: 1934
- Key people: Corrado Frera, Leonardo Frera
- Products: motorcycles, mopeds

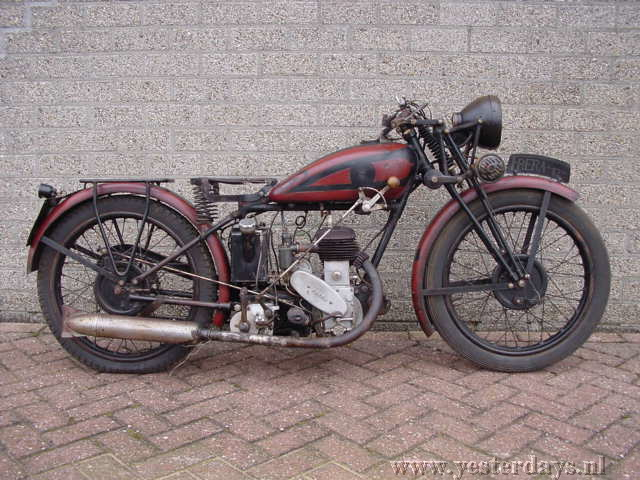
Frera Motoleggera 1931

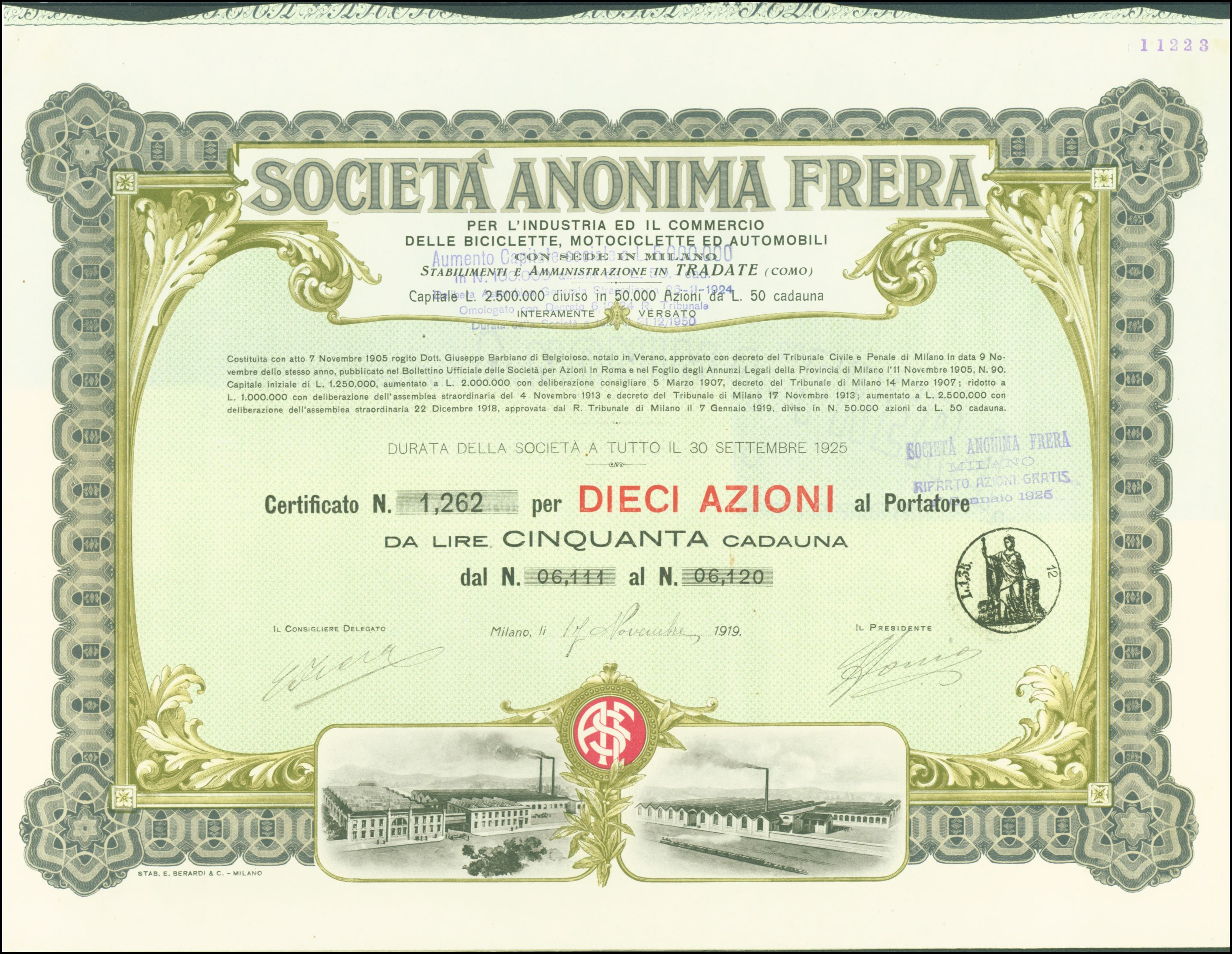
Share of the S. A. Frera, issued 17. November 1919

Frera is a historic brand of motorcycles, which were produced in Tradate. Until the late 1920s Frera was one of the leading Italian motor brands. Their factory in Tradate operated between 1905 and 1936, before becoming a museum in 2005.

== See also ==
- List of Italian companies
- List of motorcycle manufacturers
