= Tradate =

- Comune
- Città di Tradate
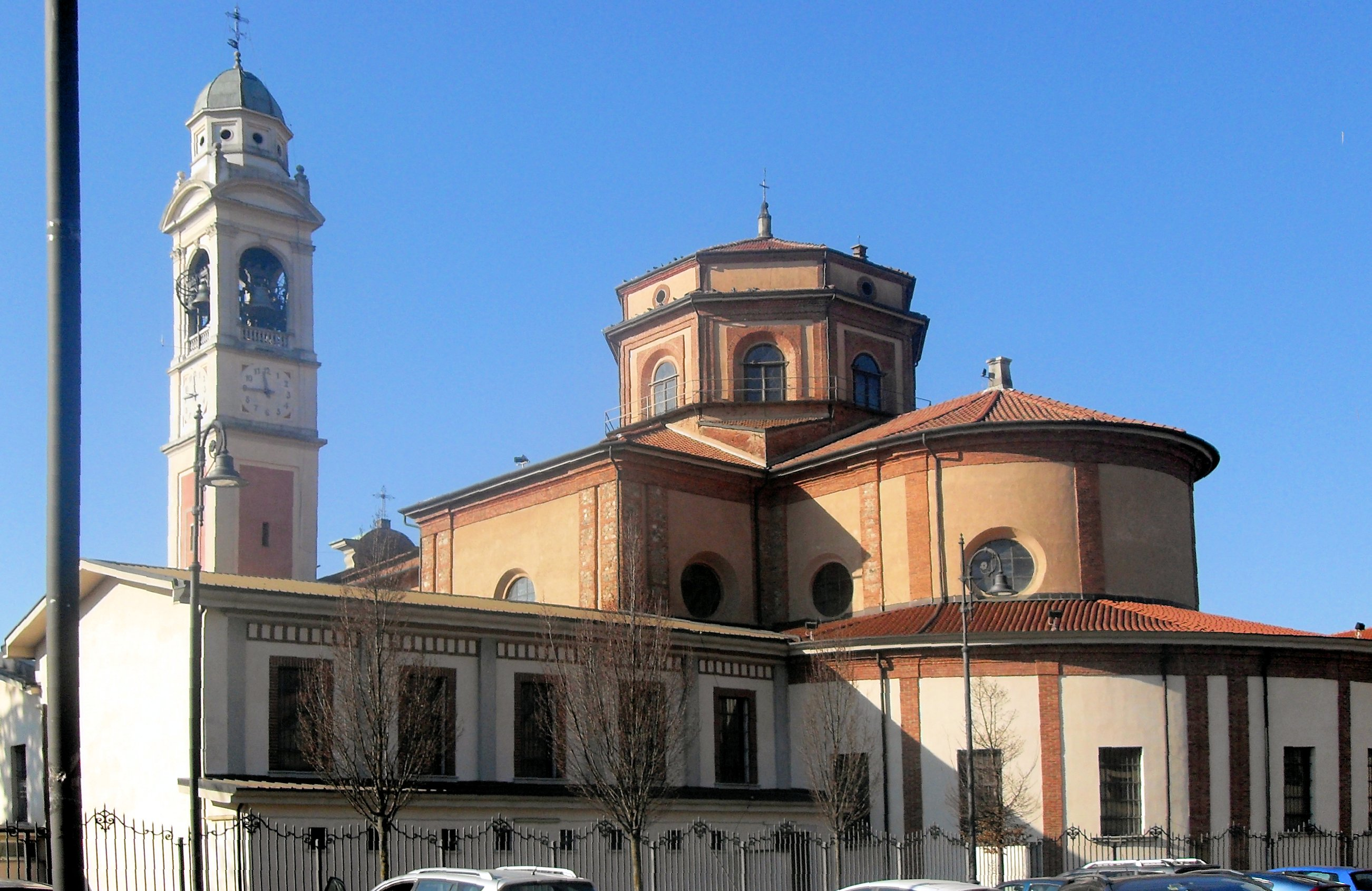

- Location within Italy Location within Lombardy
- Coordinates: 45°42′N 08°55′E
- Country: Italy
- Region: Lombardy
- Province: Varese (VA)
- Frazioni: Abbiate Guazzone

Government
  - Mayor: Giuseppe Bascialla (since 27 May 2019) (Lega Nord)

Area
  - Total: 21 km^{2} (8.1 sq mi)
- Elevation: 303 m (994 ft)

Population (31 December 2004)
  - Total: 18,768
  - Density: 890/km^{2} (2,300/sq mi)
- Demonym: Tradatesi
- Time zone: UTC+1 (CET)
  - Summer (DST): UTC+2 (CEST)
- Postal code: 21049
- Dialing code: 0331
- Patron saint: Santo Stefano
- Saint day: 26 December
- Website: Official website

Tradate is a city and comune located in the province of Varese, in the Lombardy region of northern Italy. It is located 15 kilometres (9 mi) from the city of Varese (the province's capital), and according to the 2018 census, Tradate's population was 18,983. It received the honorary title of city with a presidential decree on 28 January 1958.

The mayor is Giuseppe Bascialla.

The city hosts the Fisogni Museum of the Petrol Stations, awarded by Guinness World Records for the biggest collection in the world of fuel pumps, and the Frera Motorcycle Museum.

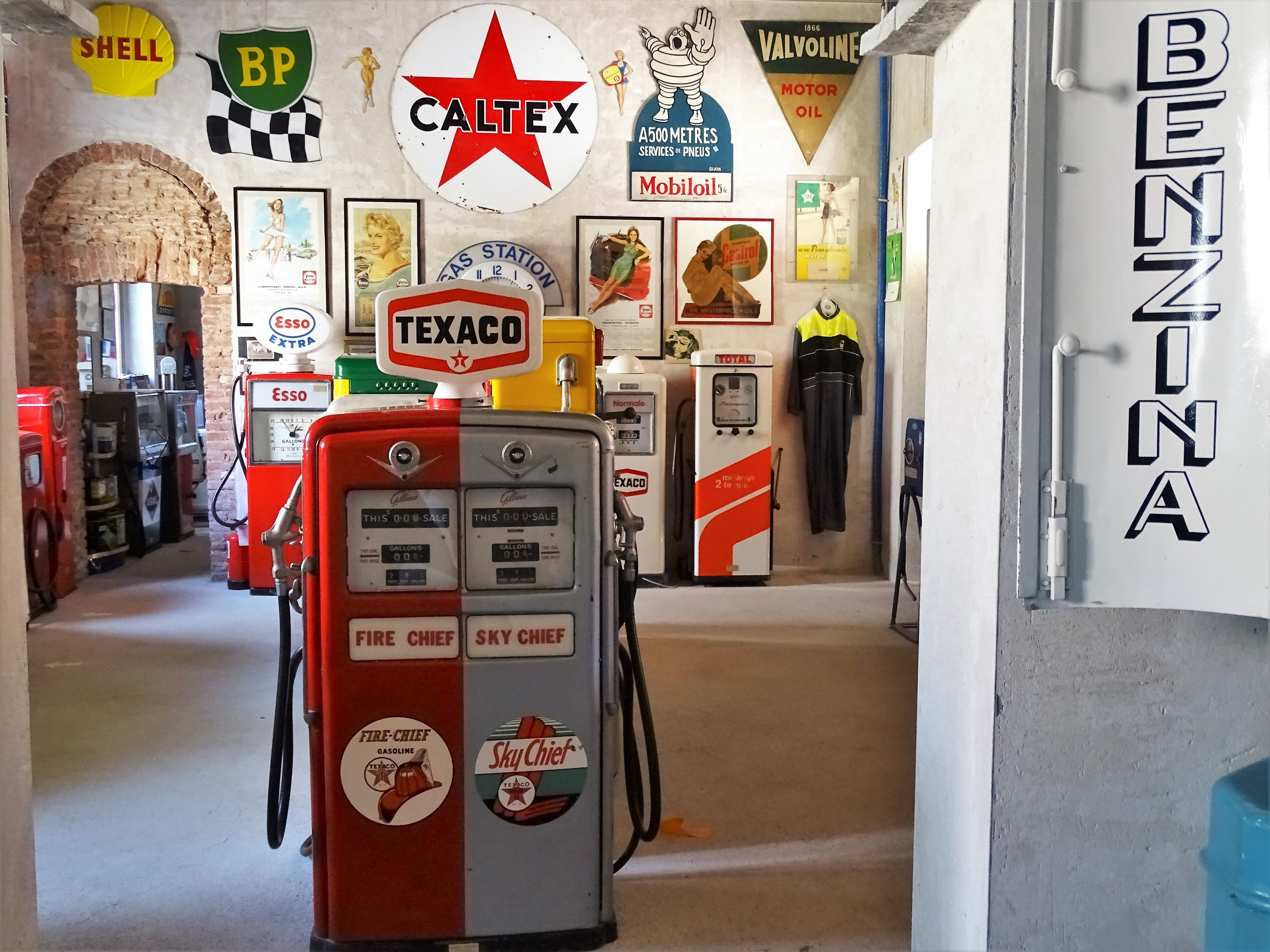
The Fisogni Museum

== The origin of the name ==
The name "Tradate" has uncertain origins. There are two different interpretations about its creation:

- The historian Gerhard Rohlfs thought that the name came from the first name Theodorus
- Antonio Olivieri, instead, thought that the denomination came from the Germanic name Teuderad, which transformed afterwards into Tederate.

== History ==
In Roman times, the Mediolanum-Bilitio road passed through Tradate's territory. This road connected Mediolanum (Milan) and Luganum (Lugano), passing through Varisium (Varese). This territory was thought to be inhabited since the Romans, and continued to be during the barbarian migrations, that brought to the fall of the Roman Empire.

== Main sights ==
- Castello Pusterla Melzi
- Villa Sopranzi, which hosts Pavoniani's institute.
- St. Stephen Church
- St. Peter and Paul Church (Abbiate Guazzone)
- St. Maria in Castello Church (built in the 14th century)
- Fisogni Museum of the Petrol Station
- Frera Motorcycle Museum
