= Mivar =

Italian consumer electronics and furniture factory

- Type: Società in accomandita semplice, later Società a responsabilità limitata
- Industry: Consumer electronics and furniture
- Founded: 1945
- Founder: Carlo Vichi
- Defunct: 2021
- Headquarters: Abbiategrasso, Lombardy, Italy
- Area served: Italy, limited exports to neighboring countries
- Products: Radios, Television sets, Tables, Chairs
- Website: Official website

Mivar (Milano Vichi Arredi Razionali, formerly standing for Milano Vichi Apparecchi Radio, and previously trading as Radio VAR), was an Italian manufacturer of consumer electronics and furniture. The brand has since been relaunched by the owner's heirs (see below).

== Location ==
It was founded by then-22-year-old entrepreneur Carlo Vichi in 1945 in Milan, moving multiple times over the years, but since circa 1968 the company headquarters is in Viale Dante 20, Abbiategrasso (45.39261°N 8.92518°E – 20 kilometres (12 mi) from Milan).

In the 1990s a larger and architecturally ambitious factory was built nearby (45.39809°N 8.92946°E), however following its completion in 2000 it never was put into service due to downsizing business, primarily attributed by Vichi to increasing Turkish and Asian competition. In mid-2025, a firecracker thrown into the premises ignited a blaze that destroyed a large part of the original company's archives.

== Products ==
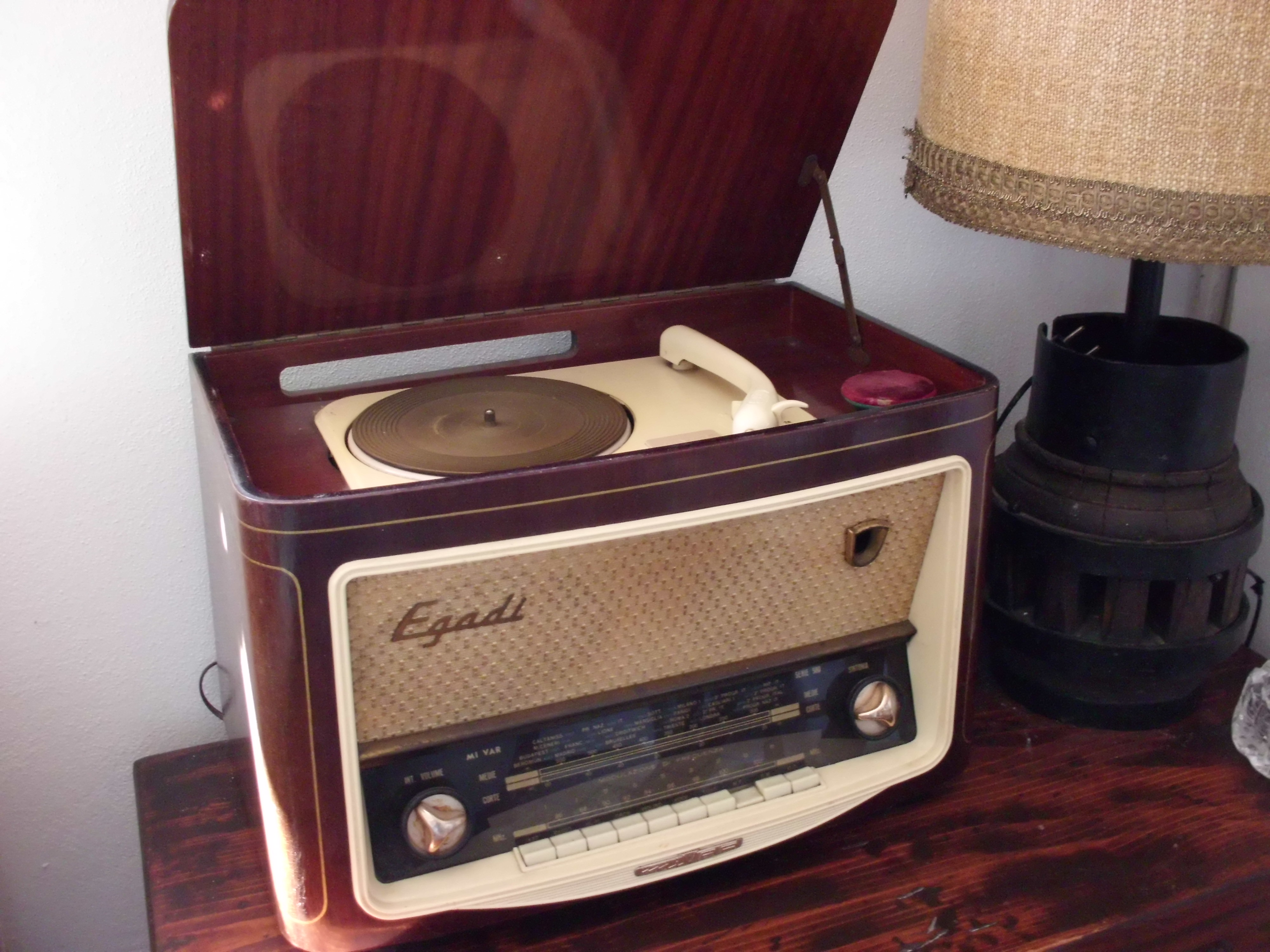
Mivar Egadi radiogram

The company started as a distributor of parts and contract designer for other radio companies; only in 1956 industrial tube radio production started; production later expanded to models with a built-in record player, as well as to CRT televisions for which the brand is still best known.

Between the 80s and 2000s Mivar TVs were a significant success in the Italian retail and commercial (TV studios, schools, hospitals, hotels, and prisons) markets; despite having few convenience or novelty features and sometimes dated designs they were competitively priced, durable, and easily serviced (thanks to included schematics and PCB annotations in Italian language, widely available and affordable spare parts, as well as lists of common faults and their causes for some models). Another iconic Mivar feature is the design of their older remote controls, such as the TC and X series, with thin buttons made of hard plastic.

By the mid-2000s Mivar had modernized their range by adopting fully electronic service adjustments and offering in their range models with flat-screen tubes, 100 Hz scan-doubling, DVB-T IDTVs, front RCA inputs; as well as having a wider range of stereo sound models. Their reputation for reliability was however partially marred by higher failure rates on certain models, such as the 14/16/20P1 employing the DS19 flyback transformer prone to internal arcing, EEPROM corruption due to bugs in the ST92195B5B1/MOH microcontroller, or non-user-upgradeable early DVB-T modules incapable of handling over 255 channels (a limit which was easily exceeded in some regions at the peak of digital TV).

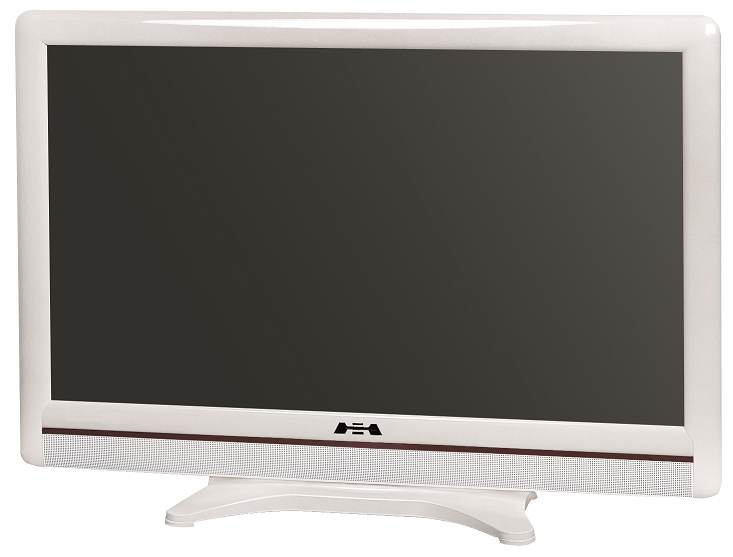
Mivar 32LED2 100 Hz white

As a conservative company not focused on the leading edge of the market, Mivar initially ignored then-expensive LCD technology and was unprepared to react to their popularity. Yet, before LCDs outsold CRTs, Mivar introduced between 2004 and 2010 a range of LCD-CCFL TVs, and in 2011 a range of LED-backlit TVs, culminating in an Android smart TV. Their design was still simple and rational, with front-facing speakers for better sound, and despite market-mandated increasing reliance on non-European component and LCD suppliers (some of whom vertically integrated competitors of Mivar), case manufacturing and assembly was still carried out in Abbiategrasso.

CRT TV production ended in June 2008.

With the bankruptcy of the Friulan domestic competitor Formenti (Sèleco, Stern, Imperial, Brionvega, Phonola, ...) in 2004, of SEI (Sinudyne) in 2006, and of foreign-assembling Q.Bell in November 2013, Mivar was the last Italian factory and for one month the last active Italian brand of televisions: by the end of the year, manufacturing was terminated, with the last unit being signed by the six remaining assembly line workers, and the television division remaining in business to offer after-sale service until 2020, having originally planned to continue doing so until 2023.

The then extremely downsized company nominally became a manufacturer of rational furniture, offering table and chair combinations for commercial use, with their design loosely based on those designed in-house for the comfort of assembly line workers; it is however doubtful whether said products actually made it to the market.

In 2017, Vichi daringly published an open letter to Samsung and other former rivals, declaring his willingness to grant free leasing of the new plant (except ordinary management expenses) to anyone who wants to produce TVs, high tech products, household appliances or electronic equipment.

== Management ==
The company has for its entire existence been owned and managed by its founder, Carlo Vichi (Montieri, 1923-02-05 – Milan, 2021-09-20).

As a stubborn anti-unionist workaholic and supporter of fascism, Vichi had a very strong influence on the company's actions and attitude, to a degree rarely seen even in small family-run companies.

Vichi eschewed the stereotypical managers' life, choosing to have his workplace in the same room as the assembly line, having the same office hours as other employees, owning an older modest car, and not having a personal computer or cell phone.

Mivar always rejected public funding and plans for a national association of electronics manufacturers. On the other hand, Vichi did not hesitate to use his personal money to subsidize the company in its later unprofitable years (100 million Euros since 2000), allowing the company to not resort to outsourcing or licensing their brand yet exiting the market debt-free, comparably to Atwater-Kent in the 1930s and unlike most of their European competitors. He has not involved his children, with whom he doesn't have successful family relations, in the business; the company in its original form ceased trading shortly before Vichi's death.

Due to these atypical practices often prioritizing employment and long term reputation against the profit motive of most businesses, Mivar has been the object of academic case studies.

== Aftermath ==
Mivar
- Type: Società a responsabilità limitata
- Industry: Consumer electronics
- Founded: 2021
- Headquarters: Abbiategrasso, Lombardy, Italy
- Area served: Italy
- Products: Television sets, major appliances
- Website: Official website

=== Bolva Italia ===
After the demise of the TV manufacturing business, former employees founded the Bolva Italia company in Abbiategrasso in late 2018, manufacturing webOS-based televisions in Poland using Chinese assemblies by ShincoBroad while still offering domestic servicing.

In the meanwhile, Mivar became a limited liability company under the ownership of Luisa and Valeria Vichi and re-entered the trade on 20 January 2022, by establishing a joint venture with Bolva - as well as a shared service department in Mivar's facilities; a range of 32 to 70 inch TVs was released soon afterwards.

The joint venture was not successful, and Mivar's website disappeared by the end of 2024.

=== Eurocom D.L.E. ===
As of late 2025, the Mivar brand is licensed to the Italian company Eurocom Distribuzione Logistica Elettrodomestici, active in the import, distribution, and sale of home appliances.

The Mivar website was reinstated in 2026, confirming as of May the use of the brand on white goods with the intention to expand it to televisions again.

== See also ==
- List of Italian Companies
