= Guerciotti =

Coordinates: 45.5020°N 9.2226°E

- Trade name: Guerciotti Export srl
- Type: Private
- Industry: Bicycle industry
- Founded: 1964; 62 years ago, Milan
- Founder: Italo Guerciotti, Paolo Guerciotti
- Headquarters: Milan, Italy
- Number of locations: 1 factory/showroom
- Area served: Worldwide
- Products: Super Record, Khaybar, Ares
- Website: guerciotti.it

Guerciotti are an Italian company that produce cyclocross, road, time trial, track and mountain bikes. Their top racing bikes "exemplify the Italian racing bicycle paradigm".

== History ==
The company was founded in 1964 outside Milan, Italy, by brothers and former cyclocross racers, Paolo and Italo Guerciotti, with advice and assistance from Cino Cinelli. In 1976, Guerciotti began sponsoring professional road cycling teams, supplying bikes to the Fiorella Mocassini team. In the following years, teams such as Fiorella Citroën, Magniflex Fam Cucine, Santini Selle Italia, Alfa Lum cycling team, and Dromedario Sidermec rode Guerciotti bikes. During this period, the Magniflex Fam Cucine team won 5 stages in the 1979 Giro d'Italia, and finished 3rd overall with Bernt Johansson.

In 1977, Paolo Guerciotti founded the GS Guerciotti cyclocross team. This team would go on to enjoy incredible success, winning two professional and seven amateur world championships.

In 1984, Antonio Mondonico became a partner and supervised the production of about 2,000 frames a year. However, the partnership with Mondonico ended in 1989.

From 2013 the Team CCC Development Team was supported and since 2019 the UCI ProTeam Bardiani CSF Faizanè.

== See also ==
- List of bicycle parts
- List of Italian companies
