= Pogliaghi =

Italian bicycle manufacturer

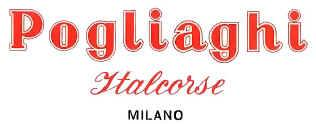
- Trade name: Pogliaghi Italcorse
- Industry: Bicycle industry
- Predecessor: Brambilla Bicycles
- Founded: 1947; 79 years ago in Milano
- Founder: Sante Pogliaghi
- Area served: Worldwide
- Products: Road bicycles, Track bicycles, Tandem bicycles, and Motor-paced racing bicycles
- Owner: STARDUE Group Srl trademark since 1991

Pogliaghi was a highly respected Italian racing bicycle manufacturer based in Milan, Italy. Sante Pogliaghi was noted as "the tailor" for his high level of craftsmanship and innovations in producing custom light weight steel bicycles for road and track racers. Over 35 World and Olympic championships are credited to his bicycles.

== History ==
Sante Pogliaghi was only 11 years old when he entered the workshop of his Uncle Franceso Brambilla as an apprentice in 1924. Brambilla was a framebuilder well known in Milan since the 20’s. The shop had two windows facing viale Elvezia, not far away from the Arena stadium. Sante would learn the craft of frame construction from Brambilla, and later was sent to Legnano and Bianchi to further his education.

In 1947 Sante purchased Brambilla’s shop in Milan, and over time introduced distinctive new frame designs and his Pogliaghi brand labels. Sante would continue to assign frame numbers following Brambilla’s roster, and add his distinctive “PSM” starting in 1962 for “Pogliaghi Sante Milano.”

He built special lightweight frames for competitions. The catalogue of Pogliaghi Italcorse offered four track models: sprint, pursuit, stayer and tandem, and two road models: road race and time trial.

The international stage of the Vigorelli velodrome was not far away from the shop and his specialty became the track competition tandem, for which he used oversize tubing and special lugs which he built himself. Pogliaghi track bikes were used for many years by the Italian National Team for international competition.

He built few frames per year. Around one hundred at the beginning of the activity up to one thousand in the last years, when six builders were working in his workshop.

Each builder worked on a frame from start to finish. He started by joining the seat tube to the bottom bracket and then the seat tube to the top tube. Then he attached the down tube to the bottom bracket and finished the main triangle by attaching the head tube. All chrome finishes and painting was done at another local shop.

Sante Pogliaghi was a craftsman. He built by sight, without using external angles and measures. He didn’t rely on frame jigs to build frames accurately, only employing a frame jig when he was building a lot of frames of the same dimensions.

He designed frames that matched the needs of the riders and of the race. His fame grew and the waiting list to have one of his frames got longer and longer.

He supplied frames to Sercu and Merckx, and to the Italians Beghetto, Faggin, Pettenella, Rossi, among the others. The labels changed depending on the sponsor but on the seat lug you could always find his unmistakable marks: head tube - Pogliaghi Italcorse (1955~1961), and later the seat lug PSM: Pogliaghi Sante Milano (1962~1983).

In November 1983 Sante Pogliaghi retired and closed his framebuilding workshop. The brand was licensed to Domenico Garbelli, who produced Pogliaghi bicycles in the Rossin Bikes factory beginning in 1984. Sante would continue as a consultant for the production of tandem and track bicycles for over a year. The brand was bought back by Sante Pogliaghi in November 1989 and resold to Alcide Basso, who also purchased the remaining production stock from Rossin. The STARDUE Group Srl purchased the Basso bicycle production with the Pogliaghi brand in 1991.

Sante Pogliaghi died at age 87 in 2000.

== Production locations ==
Only approximately 12,000 Pogliaghi bicycles were produced over 70 years, contributing to the rarity and collector interest. All frames were sequentially numbered, which can assist in identifying the year of production.

1947-1983
SANTE POGLIAGHI Italcorse
346116 Milano Italy
via Cesare Cesariono 11

1984-1989
CICLI SANTE POGLIAGHI ITALCORS s.n.c.
20040 Cavenago Brianza (MI)
Via XXIV Maggio, 48

1990-2017
CICLI BASSO s.r.l.
36030 Cresole (VI) Italy
Via Ca' Alta, 45

== Trademark ==
Sante Pogliaghi began marking frames and forks produced at the Brambilla shop as early as 1948 with "POGLIAGHI." This evolved to "POGLIAGHI ITALCORSE" before being replaced by his brand decals and the letters "PSM" stamped usually at the top of the seat tube. These distinctive markings ended with his retirement in 1983.

The Pogliaghi trademark consists of the stylized wording "POGLIAGHI" and the design portion of the mark comprises an outline of a bicycle saddle as stylized letters "SP."

The Pogliaghi and BASSO trademarks are currently owned by the STARDUE Group Srl

== Pogliaghi riders ==
Pogliaghi sponsored a G.S. Pogliaghi amateur riding club and several professional riders. Notable National, World and Olympic Champions who rode Pogliaghi to over 35 World victories and records included:

- Jacques Anquetil (FR)
- Giuseppe Beghetto (IT)
- Marino Basso (IT)
- Lorenzo Bosisio (IT)
- Maria Cressari (IT)
- Leandro Faggin (IT)
- Albert Fritz (GE)
- Guiseppe Grassi (IT)
- Roland Königshofer (AU)
- Alan Marcosson (US)
- Eddy Merckx (BE)
- Guido Messina (IT)
- Sue Novara (US)
- Mino De Rossi (IT)
- Gianni Sartori (IT)
- Patrick Sercu (BE)
- Nelson Vails (US)
- Bruno Vicino (IT)

== Current production overview ==
The Basso Bikes-built Pogliaghi “Classico” road and track bicycle models were produced between 1990 to 1995. After an extend gap, Basso reintroduced new Pogliaghi bikes along with accessories at the 2011 Eurobike show.

These Pogliaghi bikes were available from the Pogliaghi Italcorse Milano website until 2023.

== Bibliography ==
- Notebook #3 Pogliaghi Artisan bicycle builders of the Heroic era, Quaderni Eroici, 2021.
- The Custom Bicycle, Chapter 16 - Sante Pogliaghi, by Denise de la Rosa and Michael Kolin, 1978.

== See also ==
- List of Italian companies
