= Somec =

- Type: Private
- Industry: Bicycle industry
- Founded: 1973; 53 years ago, Lugo
- Founder: Oliviero Gallegati
- Headquarters: Lugo, Italy
- Area served: Worldwide
- Products: Bicycles and Bicycle frame
- Website: somec.com

The Societa Mechanica was organized by Giro d'Italia mechanic Oliviero Gallegati in the 1960s, in order to set a group of working standards. When he opened his bicycle shop in Lugo, Italy, rather than following the almost universal custom in the Italian cycle industry of naming the company after himself, he instead named it Somec, for Societa Mechanica. A very small artisanal shop, Somec makes only a few bikes a year, out of steel or aluminum.

The Somec Cavallino logo is often confused with that of Ferrari but has the horse's tail hanging down instead of held upwards, by personal agreement between the two men, according to the official story.

Somec previously made frames solely from steel and aluminum materials, but has since followed conventional technical advancements into the use of carbon fiber and titanium. As of the 2007 model year, their catalog contains seven carbon frames, one titanium frame, 5 aluminum/aluminum-carbon frames, and one steel frame.

== See also ==
- List of bicycle parts
- List of Italian companies
