= Sicom test =

Sicom test srl is an Italian test and certification laboratory for telecommunication products. Sicom was founded in 2003 and is based at the 'AREA Science Park in Trieste.

== Profile ==
Sicom is a test laboratory for telecommunication, unique in Italy, both for the specific skill of its staff and for the instrumentation at its disposal. The laboratory plays an intense research and development to keep updated with the constantly evolving technology, and offers to the telecommunications companies, test and certification services.

(Source: AREA Science Park)

== See also ==
- List of Italian Companies
