= Fabbrica Ligure Automobili Genova =

Italian automobile manufacturer founded in 1905

FLAG Fabbrica Ligure Automobili Genova
- Industry: Automotive
- Founded: 1905
- Defunct: 1908
- Fate: merged with Società Piemontese Automobili (S.P.A.) in 1909
- Headquarters: Genoa, Italy
- Products: Automobiles

Fabbrica Ligure Automobili Genova (FLAG) was an Italian automobile manufacturer founded in 1905 by investors in La Spezia, Liguria, that produced large, prestigious, luxury vehicles. Shortly after founding it transferred to Genoa and then in 1909 it merged with Società Piemontese Automobili (S.P.A.) in Turin.

== History ==
The company was established in 1905 by investors in La Spezia, Liguria, Italy to produce large, prestigious, luxury vehicles, but shortly after founding it transferred to Genoa. The lack of technical skills in the Genoese workforce forced the company to seek business partners, and resulted in both the 1907 closure of the Genoa plant and the 1909 merger with the Turin automobile manufacturer Società Piemontese Automobili (SPA). The new company traded as Società Ligure Piemontese Automobili.

The company was also the Italian agent for Thornycroft vehicles.

== Manufacturing ==
The emphasis on quality meant that steel was imported from Krupp in Germany and vehicle testing was extensive, but lack of technical skills in the workforce resulted in both the 1907 closure of the Genoa plant and the 1909 transfer of manufacturing to the Turin manufacturer Società Piemontese Automobili (SPA).

== Vehicles ==
The initial cars were a 12/16 hp and 16/24 hp, both with four-cylinder engines and shaft drive. Later they added a 40 hp model with chain drive. All engines had the cylinders cast in pairs. The range was expanded with six-cylinder models rated as 40 and 70 hp.

== Competition ==
In 1906 the Marchese Giovanni Battista Raggio won the Circuito Bresciano with a "FLAG 6S/40".

F.L.A.G. initially entered 3 cars for the 1907 I Kaiser Preis held on 13–14 June in the Taunus mountains, but only Carlo Raggio was named and no vehicles started.

== See also ==
- List of Italian companies
