= Nuova Cometra =

Nuova Cometra S.r.l.
- Type: Private
- Industry: Railway cars interiors
- Founded: Italy (1999)
- Headquarters: Pace del Mela, Messina, Italy
- Key people: Valerio Labate, President
- Website: http://www.nuovacometra.it/

Nuova Cometra S.r.l. is an Italian company that operates in the field of interior design and the manufacturing of walls, doors, windows, and floors, providing a range of products and processes for manufacturers of all transport carriages: trains, planes, ships, yachts, buses, and tubes.

The plant is situated within the industrial area of Giammoro, in Pace del Mela, just outside Messina. It is about 50,000 square metres of which 14,000 are indoors.

The indoor area of the plant is divided into departments: Joinery and bench work, Carpentry, Sticking, Welding, Painting, Pressing, Forging, Cutting and sectioning, Edge bending, Engineering and design, indoor storeroom, indoor track to allow carriages in.

== History ==
Nuova Cometra dates back to 1982 when “Cometra” was founded to manufacture train components such as boarding, windows, keels, seats and internal walls.

The production continued for 16 years, up until the time when the market group leader Ansaldobreda decided to dismiss it.

In 1999 the company acquired the factory to bring it back to its golden days.

At present the company offers internal wall linings, internal gangways, ceiling drops, window lines, boarding doors, side and end doors, floors and windows, covering a wide range of needs for interior furbishing in the transport field.
