= Design42Day =

Design company in Milan, Italy

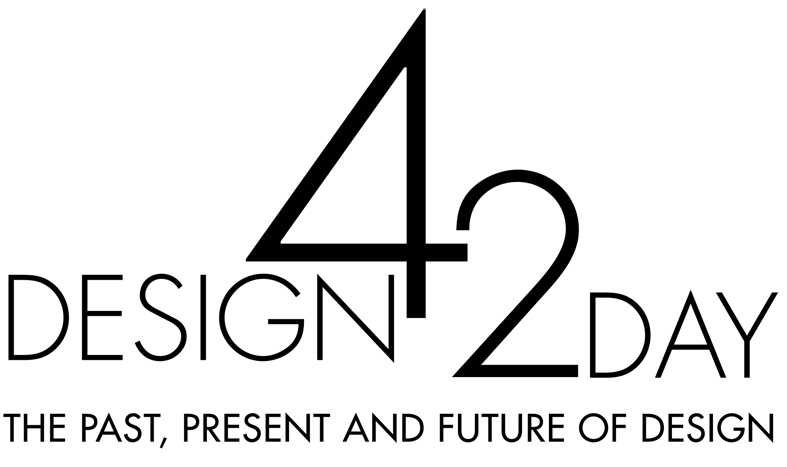
- Founded: 2007
- Founder: Riccardo Capuzzo and Patrick Abbattista
- Headquarters: Milan, Italy
- Key people: Camilla Rettura
- Website: www.design42day.com

Design42Day is a company based in Milan, Italy, specialized in the research, selection and promotion of design on an international scale.

== History and personnel ==
Design42Day began as a recreational blog in 2007 by Riccardo Capuzzo, the Art Director and Editor-in-Chief. Patrick Abbattista, who joined the project in 2009 as Co-Founder and Head of Sales and Marketing, left the company in 2015 to launch DesignWanted, currently one of the most influential voices on Instagram about Architecture & Design. Camilla Rettura held the position of Executive Editor from 2012 till 2014. In 2012, Design42Day contributed to the foundation of the “Bocconi Students 4 Design” association in Bocconi University and participated in the launching of their first event with Italian designer Fabio Novembre.

Design42Day’s online magazine focuses on five different areas of design, including fashion, industrial design, visual design, transportation design and architecture.

== Special projects ==
Design42Day is involved in several special projects. Since 2011, they have a dedicated section on the online magazine reserved for the Istituto Europeo di Design where they showcase interviews and news about talented students. Furthermore, they have played an active role in bringing both the Istituto Europeo di Design and the Adobe Design Achievement Awards to the Moscow Design Week in 2012. The same year, Design42Day has collaborated closely with the Electrolux Design Lab for the search of a Social Media Correspondent to cover Electrolux’s event in the fall. Design42Day has launched a project dedicated to the presentation of international talents to sell in their personal corner within the White Gallery lifestyle store in Rome, Italy.

== International events ==
In 2011, Design42Day finalized ten media partnerships with various design and fashion weeks around the world. In 2012, the number of media partnerships grew to thirteen, including the Red Dot Design Award.

Partners

- Zooppa
- PCHouse.com.cn
- Istituto Europeo di Design

2011

- Riga Fashion Week
- Modalisboa
- Moscow Design Week
- Belgrade Fashion Week
- BCN Design Week
- Beijing Design Week
- Adobe Design Achievement Awards
- Colombiamoda
- Sofia Design Week
- New Designers
- Electrolux Design Lab

2012

- Riga Fashion Week
- Modalisboa
- AGideas
- International Talent Support
- Mercedes-Benz Kiev Fashion Days
- Red Dot
- Adobe Design Achievement Awards
- Sofia Design Week
- New Designers
- Electrolux Design Lab
- World Brand Congress
- Belarus Fashion Week

2013

- IDE Design Mission Middle East 2013

== See also ==
- List of companies of Italy
