= Basso Bikes =

Italian bicycle manufacturer

Coordinates: 45.7789052°N 11.8247992°E

- Type: Private
- Industry: Bicycle
- Founded: 1977; 49 years ago in San Zenone degli Ezzelini, Italy
- Founder: Alcide Basso
- Headquarters: San Zenone degli Ezzelini, Italy
- Area served: Worldwide
- Products: Bicycles, electric bicycles, bicycle frames and related components
- Owner: Stardue Group
- Website: bassobikes.com

Basso Bikes is an Italian brand that produces and sells road racing bicycles and electric bicycles. It was founded in 1977 by Alcide Basso, brother of the world champion Marino Basso. Currently, the company headquarters is located in San Zenone degli Ezzelini, in the province of Treviso, while the production department is located in Dueville, in the province of Vicenza.

== History ==
Before registering the company, Alcide Basso started making bicycles in his family's garage in 1974, in Rettorgole di Caldogno.

During the two-year period 1978–1979, the entry into the competition bicycle market and the international market took place: Germany became the first large market and large importers such as Brügelmann and Stier decided to order large quantities of frames. Basso initially made frames of steel: they later acquired the Pogliaghi brand name in 1989 and produced the Classico road and track models until 2017. From 1996, they make frames of carbon fiber too.

In 1979, Eddy Merckx visits the factories with a view to developing his own racing bike brand. Innovations on materials are introduced with the use of a type of automotive-derived steel, more resistant to rust and then move on to the use of carbon. The first carbon frame was sent to the Austrian University of Graz and was the subject of a study on the torsional and bending forces of carbon frames.

At the beginning of the 90s, racing bicycles are used at the highest levels, among others by Dimitri Konyshev, Gilberto Simoni, Massimo Strazzer and Endrio Leoni.

== Ownership ==
The Basso Bikes brand is now owned by the Stardue group, a company that also includes the Lee Cougan mountain bike brand and Microtech accessories, also owned by the Basso family. On a commercial level, the brand is present in over 25 countries and has a network of over 400 dealers.

== Sponsorship ==
Basso Bikes is a sponsor of 6 pro team, including Adria Mobil, Slovenian professional road racing team in Continental Circuit, and Cams-Basso, an English women professional team.

== See also ==
- Aventon Bikes
