= Dario Pegoretti =

Italian bicycle framebuilder

- Born: 18 January 1956
- Died: 23 August 2018 (aged 62); Verona, Italia
- Occupation: Bicycle framebuilder

Dario Pegoretti (18 January 1956 – 23 August 2018) was an Italian bicycle framebuilder based for many years in Caldonazzo, outside the town of Trento, in the Dolomites, Italy, and then later for a few years in Verona, Italy.

He was a contemporary steel and aluminum bicycle frame builder and a pioneer of lugless TIG welded frames.

== Career ==
Pegoretti used only steel and aluminum to create his frames, primarily using drawn tubes (including custom shapes based on his specifications and designs) from Excell, Dedacciai, and most recently Columbus. His most recent models included the Responsorium, Day is Done, Big Leg Emma, Mxxxxxo, Duende, Luigino, Love #3, and 8:30AM.

He apprenticed with master Italian framebuilder Luigino Milani, who was also his father-in-law.

Pegoretti designed and built frames that were ridden by professional cyclists Miguel Indurain, Marco Pantani, Stephen Roche, Claudio Chiappucci, Mario Cipollini, and Andrea Tafi among others. He started out as a contract builder, making frames that were then branded by other manufacturers, including some Pinarello models, until the American distributor Giorgio Andretta of GITA convinced him to build under his own name. Floyd Landis owns and rides a Love #3. He supplied comedian Robin Williams with bikes that the actor regularly used and particularly admired; and Williams also gave them as gifts.

Pegoretti also created custom paint and graphics designs for customers. The 'ciavate' paint scheme is entirely hand-painted by Dario and originally drew inspiration from Jean-Michel Basquiat. His work was highly creative, inventive, and very influenced by his deep love of music. His frame model names and graphic often included references to and/or quotations of his favorite musical and prose pieces.

In addition to running his framebuilding studio, Mr. Pegoretti was also a respected teacher, and lectured and taught seminars at various design schools.

Dario Pegoretti's famous slogan was "fatti con le mani" ("made by hand") and he lived by this motto completely. He constantly combined aspects of art, craft and creativity. His craftsmanship was rare because it was difficult to replicate his level of detail.

== Illness ==
In 2007, Pegoretti was diagnosed with lymphoma but had recovered.

On 23 August 2018 Dario Pegoretti died of heart failure at approximately 19:00 hours in Verona, Italy.

== Awards ==
Pegoretti won the President's Choice award at the 2007 North American Handmade Bicycle Show and framebuilder of the year at the 2008 show.

== See also ==
- List of bicycle parts
- List of Italian companies
