= Hera (company) =

Italian utility company

Hera S.p.A.

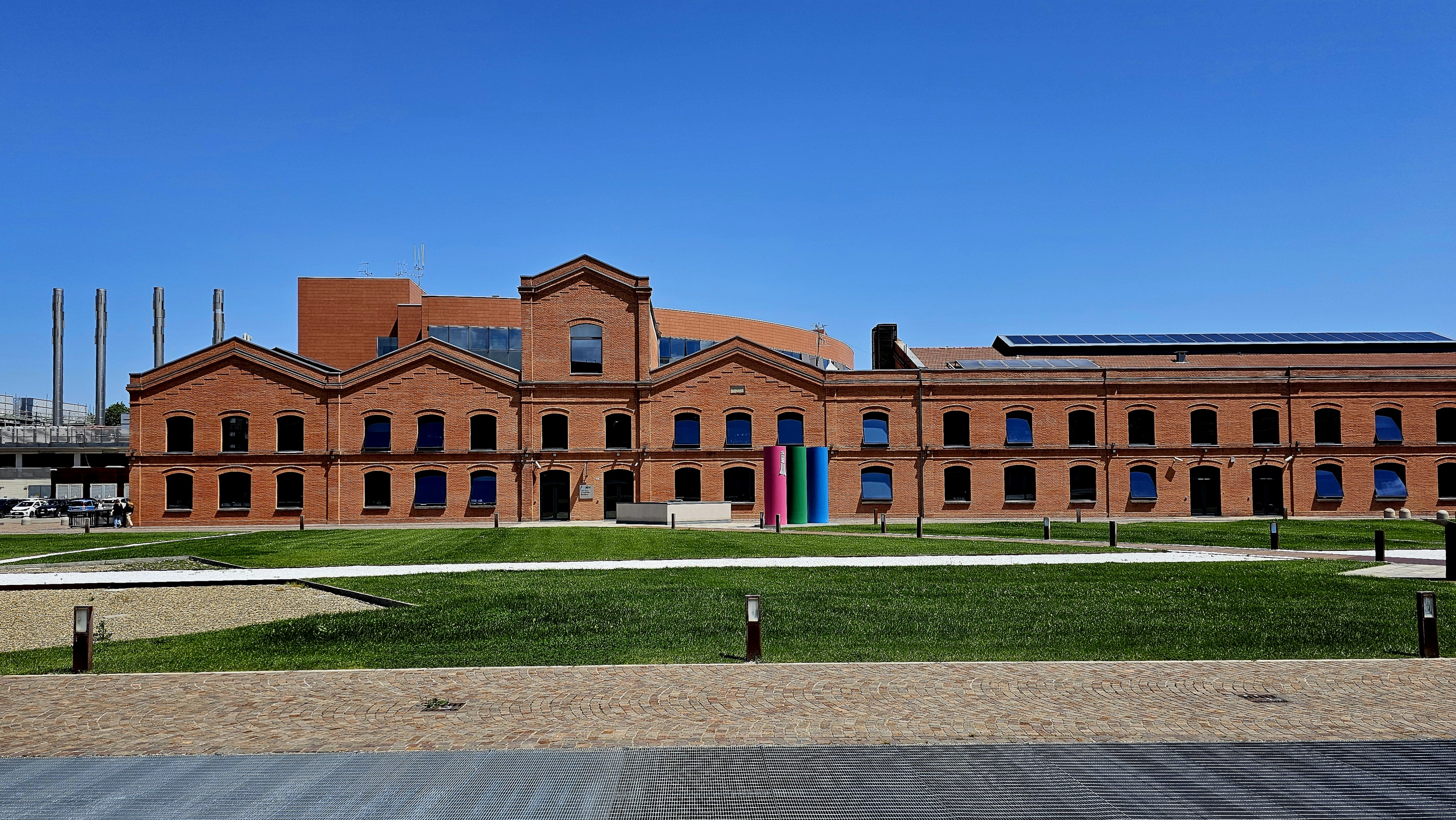
- Hera headquarters in Bologna, Italy
- Company type: Public
- Traded as: BIT: HER; FTSE MIB
- ISIN: IT0001250932
- Industry: Multiutility
- Founded: November 1, 2002; 23 years ago
- Headquarters: Bologna, Italy
- Area served: Italy
- Key people: Cristian Fabbri (Chairman); Orazio Iacono (CEO); Tommaso Rotella (Vice-chairman)
- Products: Natural gas, Water supply, Waste management and Electricity
- Revenue: € 12,969 million (2025)
- Operating income: € 464 million (2025)
- Number of employees: 10,456 (2025)
- Website: eng.gruppohera.it

Hera S.p.A. (acronym for Holding Energia Risorse Ambiente, Energy Resource Environment Holdings), commonly known as Hera Group, is a multiutility company based in Bologna, Italy. Hera operates in the distribution of gas, water, energy, and waste disposal in the provinces of Bologna, Ferrara, Forlì-Cesena, Modena, Pesaro, Pordenone, Ravenna, Rimini, Trieste, Udine and Urbino, and in some municipalities of Ancona, Gorizia, Padua and Venice.

In October 2012, Hera approved the merger with AcegasAps, which operates in the cities of Padua and Trieste. On 1 July 2014 AMGA, which operates in Udine merged with Hera Group.

In 2025, Hera was the number one Italian domestic operator in terms of the amount of waste treated (7.6 million tons), in second place for the volumes of water supplied (286 million m³), the third gas distribution operator by volumes distributed (12.5 billions m³ sold) and the fifth electricity distribution operator by volumes distributed (16.3 TWh sold).

== Corporate history ==
Hera was established in 2002 through the first merger of public utilities in the Emilia-Romagna region, which involved 11 companies.

In 2003, Hera started the process of listing on the Milan Stock Exchange, which led the company to be partly privatized with 38.8% of its present share capital in private sectors. After 2003, Hera started to grow. In over five years, the Group merged with other Italian companies operating in distribution of energy, water and gas, such as AGEA, ECOSEA, META, Geat Distribution Gas, and SAT.

Hera also had many long-term contracts with foreign suppliers over the years that followed. In 2006, Hera signed a memorandum of understanding with Enel, Edison and Sonatrach. The memorandum provided for the purchase of one billion cubic meters a year of natural gas transported through the methane pipeline belonging to GALSI, a partner company of Hera.

In July 2008, Hera acquired Megas Trade, selling gas and electricity in the Urbino area, owned by Marche Multiservices. The transaction formalized the birth of Hera Comm Marche, the commercial branch of the Hera Group for the Marche region, managed by Hera Comm.

On 25 July 2012, approval was given for the merger with AcegasAps (Trieste-Padua), which became part of the Hera Group as of 1 January 2013.

On 1 July 2014 AMGA merged with Hera Group.

== Company profile and organizational structure ==
Strategies and activities are mainly carried out by the holding, which has a leading and coordinating role throughout its participations.

The Hera Group's shareholding structure includes 110 municipalities which hold 45.8% of the shares together with other public shareholders. The remaining 54.2% of the free float is held by private individuals divided between institutional and retail investors, banking foundations and companies.

Shareholder Base as at 2025:

- Municipality of Bologna (12.599%)
- Municipality of Imola (7.375%)
- Municipality of Modena (6.863%)
- Municipality of Ravenna (6.470%)
- Lazard (5.043%)
- Municipality of Trieste (4.954%)
- Municipality of Padua (4.803%)
- Municipality of Udine (3.836%)

== Current operations ==
The Hera Group operates in the public utility services sector, pursuing a sustainable management policy.

The company is involved in the design of networks and plants, the management of integrated water systems, waste collection and treatment, energy distribution and sales, as well as public lighting and telecommunications.

Hera Group EBITDA composition (as at 31 December 2025):

- Waste Management (24.3%)
- Water (21.6%)
- Electricity (16.6%)
- Gas (35.4%)
- Other Services (2.1%)

Hera has the largest number of waste treatment plants in Italy. The environmental hygiene services provided by Hera Group in 188 municipalities in Emilia-Romagna, Friuli-Venezia Giulia, Marche, Tuscany and Veneto are part of an integrated waste management system. Activities include separated urban waste collection, washing and cleaning roads, pavements and porticos, cleaning up green areas and complementary services such as the reclamation of degraded areas and cleaning up beaches. The high percentage of separate waste collection and disposal in the reference areas makes the Group a major national operator in the field of environmental services:

- waste treated: 7.6 million tonnes
- segregated waste: 75.8%
- number of plants: 94

Hera Group is one of the largest Italian operators in integrated water service management, with a total network of 35.136 km, 394 drinking water plants and 857 treatment plants that serves 228 municipalities:

- water customers: 3.6 million
- cubic metres of water sold: 285.9 million

Hera is also a major national operator in gas and electricity sectors. Managing networks spanning 20 thousand km, Hera Group distributes natural gas in the provinces of Bologna, Ravenna, Forlì-Cesena, Ferrara, Modena, Rimini, Padua, Trieste, Gorizia and Udine. Through its subsidiary Marche Multiservizi, it also has a presence in the province of Pesaro-Urbino. In Bologna, Imola, Forlì, Cesena, Ferrara, Modena, Ravenna and Padua, the Group also offers district heating services, providing heat to buildings located far away from the point of production. With networks spanning 460 km, Hera serves around 82 thousand apartments. In 2013, its environmentally-friendly technology enabled it to achieve a primary energy saving of more than 34 thousand tonnes of oil equivalent (toe). Hera also oversees the distribution of electricity through 12 thousand km of grids in the provinces of Modena, Bologna, Ravenna, Gorizia and Trieste, serving a total of around 623 thousand inhabitants. The Group’s main commitment in this sector is to the implementation of smart grids and the distribution of digital meters. These are designed to ensure the rapid and remote management and exchange of an enormous volume of information about effective electricity consumption between producer, distributor and consumer.

- gas customers: 1.8 million;
- electricity customers: 2.5 million;
- cubic metres of gas sold: 12.5 billion;
- electricity sold: 16.3 TWh.

== Competitors and market shares: benchmark by business ==
Hera Group can be compared to the other listed Italian multi-utilities. Comparison on operating data by business (waste, water, gas and electricity) also highlights the market shares.

=== Waste: waste treated 2025 (thousands of tonnes) ===
- Hera Group: 7,582.4
- A2A: 4,763.0
- Iren: 4,129.0
- Acea: 1,603.0

=== Water: volumes provided in 2025 (million of cubic meters) ===
- Hera Group: 285.8
- Iren: 191.0
- A2A: 67.0

=== Gas: volumes sold 2025 (million of cubic meters) ===
- A2A: 2,825.0
- Hera Group: 2,603.7
- Iren: 777.0

=== Energy: energy sold 2025 (Gwh) ===
- A2A: 27,545.0
- Hera Group: 16,345.1
- Iren: 6,400.0
