= B-P Battioni e Pagani S.p.A. =

- Company type: Subsidiary
- Industry: Forklifts
- Founded: 1959
- Headquarters: Sobrolo, Parma, Italy
- Area served: Europe
- Number of employees: 48

B-P Battioni e Pagani S.p.A. is an Italian manufacturer of forklifts. The company makes diesel and electric forklifts. The company is UNI EN ISO 9002 certified and UNI EN ISO 9001:2000 certified since 2002.

== History ==
The company was created in 1959 in northern Italy. At the beginning the company produced forklifts use in Italy. These vehicles were used in the wood and agricultural industry for moving wood panels. After ten years the company began to produce vehicles for factories in Italy and Western Europe.

== Current models ==
The capacity of B-P's forklifts are 2,4,5,6 and 7 T(the smallest segment).

4-WAY

- QL-T7
- QL-T6.5
- QL-T6
- QL-T5
- QL-T4.5
- QL-T4

SIDE LOADERS (Diesel and LPG)

- HT7UP
- HT6UP
- HT5KS
- HT4KS
- HT3.5KU
- HT3KU

== Publications ==
This company is listed in Container Contacts: The European Multimodal Guide – 2011 Edition By Storck.
