= Darling (sunscreen) =

Italian sun care brand

- Type: Private
- Industry: Cosmetics
- Founded: 2018; 8 years ago
- Founder: Alberto Giacobazzi; Ilenia Gebennini
- Headquarters: Quattro Castella, Italy
- Area served: Europe; Middle East; United States
- Products: Sunscreen; Skin care
- Owner: Alberto Giacobazzi; Ilenia Gebennini
- Parent: AG Cosmetics
- Website: darlingsun.com

Darling is an Italian sun care brand launched in 2018 by Alberto Giacobazzi and Ilenia Gebennini, and the first brand of their company AG Cosmetics.

== History ==
Giacobazzi and Gebennini founded AG Cosmetics in 2017 and launched Darling in 2018. The brand is described as born in Modena, while AG Cosmetics is based in Quattro Castella, in the province of Reggio Emilia. According to the founders, the brand was conceived during a trip to California, and the company was financed with the founders' own capital. The brand's slogan plays on the acronym SPF, which the company says stands for "stay pretty forever".

Darling is sold online and in physical stores. In 2019 it signed with retailers including Cult Beauty in the United Kingdom, Niche Beauty in Germany and Galeries Lafayette in France, and it entered Spain through a distributor in 2020. Giacobazzi was named by Forbes Italia among its 100 under-30 leaders of the future in the e-commerce category in 2021; at that time the brand was present in 19 countries. In 2025 the Spanish distributor Danbel added Darling to its portfolio.

== Sun care ==
Darling has sun care lotions with SPF protection, tan "enhancers", and items for post sun exposure use. In 2022 the company launched its first spray sunscreen, available in SPF 30 and SPF 50+. The lotions are vegan and paraben-free, and ingredients include vitamin E and antioxidants. The scent used in the range, Monoi de Tahiti, comes from an oil imported from Polynesia, made from coconut pulp macerated with tiaré flowers. Other ingredients include aloe vera, allantoin, horsetail, apricot oil, jojoba oil, blueberry extract and chamomile. In 2021 AG Cosmetics was among the first companies in Italy to use "Pe green", a recyclable material derived from sugar cane, for the packaging of its latest product.
