= Miche (company) =

Italian bicycle component company

- Type: Privately held company
- Industry: Cycling components
- Founded: 1919; 107 years ago
- Headquarters: San Vendemiano, Italy
- Area served: Worldwide
- Key people: Ferdinando Michelin
- Products: Bicycle related components
- Website: miche.it

Miche is an Italian bicycle component company based in San Vendemiano in the Italian Province of Treviso.

== History ==
Miche was founded by Augusto and Ferdinando Michelin in 1919, when they established 'Ciclo Piave' in Santa Lucia di Piave. The company initially specialized in the construction of bicycles, quickly expanding its production line to include motorcycles by 1921. In 1936, the two Michelin brothers opted to disassociate their business interests. Ferdinando consequently launched a new manufacturing plant in Conegliano. This facility continued the production of both bicycles and motorcycles, marketed under the brand designation 'Stella Veneta'. In 1948, Ferdinando proceeded to establish a separate commercial entity, the Ferdinando Michelin Conegliano (F.M.C) corporation. This firm dedicated itself to the fabrication of components for bicycles, including security locks, luggage carriers, and notably, the creation of the industry's first quick-release mechanism for cycle wheels. Ferdinando subsequently transferred managerial oversight of Stella Veneta to his two offspring, Italo and Tideo.

Miche's line of bicycle components is primarily focused on road cycling. The company also produces components for track racing and sponsors the Miche cycling team.

== See also ==
- List of bicycle parts
- List of Italian companies
