= Manteco =

Italian textile company specializing in high-end wool fabrics

Manteco S.p.A.
- Type: Società per azioni
- Industry: Textiles
- Founded: 1943
- Founder: Enzo Anacleto Mantellassi
- Headquarters: Montemurlo, Prato, Italy
- Key people: Franco Mantellassi (Chairman), Marco Mantellassi (co-CEO), Matteo Mantellassi (co-CEO)
- Products: Wool fabrics
- Revenue: ~€99 million (2024)
- Website: manteco.com

Manteco is an Italian textile company headquartered in Montemurlo, in the Prato textile district. Founded in 1943, the company produces high-end fabrics with a core focus on recycled and low-impact wool fibers.

== History ==
The company's origins date to 1941, when founder Enzo Anacleto Mantellassi acquired a semi-destroyed spinning mill in Prato and began producing recycled wool yarn from reclaimed military blankets and garments during World War II. The business was formally established in 1943 as Lanificio San Marco, when Mantellassi purchased looms and began producing woven fabrics.

Following the founder's death in 1967, leadership passed to his son Franco Mantellassi. In 2000, Franco's sons Marco and Matteo Mantellassi became co-CEOs.

In December 2023, Manteco acquired the spinning mill Casentino Lane, a carded spinning facility in Bibbiena (Arezzo) employing 27 workers, to vertically integrate its production. The acquisition added approximately 700,000 kg of annual yarn capacity.

== Products ==
The company's main products are fabrics made from two proprietary fibers:

MWool is a mechanically recycled wool fiber in which color is obtained by blending pre-dyed reclaimed fibers rather than dyeing new material. A life cycle assessment (LCA) published in the journal Resources found significant reductions in environmental impact compared to generic virgin wool across indicators including climate change, water use, and energy consumption. The fiber holds an Environmental Product Declaration (EPD).

ReviWool is a virgin wool fiber made from co-product fibers recovered during the worsting process. A dedicated LCA published in the Journal of Cleaner Production reported reductions in climate change impact, water use, and energy consumption compared to conventional virgin wool tops.

=== Research collaborations ===
The company conducts research with several academic institutions, including the Polytechnic University of Turin, the University of Leeds, and the University of Trieste.

A 2024 study with the University of Leeds, published in Cleaner Engineering and Technology, found that wool fabrics can be mechanically recycled in a closed loop up to six times while retaining quality suitable for high-end production, provided fibers maintain a minimum length of 20 mm. Other peer-reviewed studies have addressed the marine biodegradability of recycled wool fibers.

== Operations ==
=== Supply chain ===
Manteco's production relies on a network of over 56 partner companies within the Prato textile district, operating at short range. Il Sole 24 Ore reported in 2018 that Manteco supported 56 small local suppliers within this system. In 2024, Corriere della Sera described the network as an operation aimed at preserving the local artisanal supply chain.

=== Financial performance ===
Revenue grew from €20 million to approximately €91 million over the decade ending in 2019. After a pandemic-related decline, revenue recovered to €78 million in 2021 and reached approximately €97 million in 2022. Revenue remained stable at around €99 million in 2024.

=== Market presence ===
The company supplies fabrics to international fashion brands. It engages in co-branding, providing a dedicated label for garments made with its materials. Clients include luxury groups such as LVMH, Kering, Ralph Lauren and Moncler, as well as retailers including Inditex.

== Industry initiatives ==
Manteco is a member of the Ellen MacArthur Foundation's Network, having joined in November 2021. The company is also a signatory to a UNECE sustainability pledge on traceability in the textile sector.

In 2018, the company launched Manteco Academy, an educational programme for fashion students and professionals focused on circular design and sustainability.

== Recognition ==
The company has received several industry awards. In 2018, it was included in the London Stock Exchange Group's "1000 Companies to Inspire Europe" report. In 2023, the German trade publication TextilWirtschaft awarded Manteco its Forum Preis, citing the company's innovation and creativity within a family-run structure. Also in 2023, it received the Climate Action Award at the CNMI (Camera Nazionale della Moda Italiana) Sustainable Fashion Awards, held at Teatro alla Scala. That same year, it received the "Top 100 Performance" prize at the Sustainability Award, promoted by Kon Group and ALTIS Università Cattolica. In 2024, it was named Industria Felix as one of the 100 most competitive companies in Central Italy. Also in 2024, the non-profit Textile Exchange named Manteco its Climate Project of the Year.

== See also ==
- Prato textile district
- Textile recycling
- Wool
- Circular economy
