= Suomy =

Italian brand of motorcycle helmets

Suomy Motosport S.r.l.
- Company type: S.r.l.
- Industry: Motorcycle helmets
- Founded: 1997
- Headquarters: Lurago d'Erba, Italy
- Website: www.suomy.com

Suomy (pronounced su-oh-mee) is an Italian brand of motorcycle helmets.

Suomy was founded in 1997, In 2000, Suomy signed a partnership agreement with Ducati. Due to this collaboration, the most talented Ducati riders engaged in the Superbike World Championship started using Suomy helmets.

In 2001 Suomy won the first World Title with Troy Bayliss.. He confirmed his World Title in 2006 and 2008 too. During the same years, Suomy sponsored riders of the caliber of Troy Corser, Aaron Slight, Ben Bostrom, Scott Russell and Ruben Xaus. Subsequently, Neil Hodgson in 2003 and James Toseland in 2004 and 2007 will be proclaimed SBK World Champions.

In 2003 Suomy became the lead actor in the 250 GP Championship with Manuel Poggiali‘s World victory. The 2000s are also characterized by Suomy’s debut in the MotoGP World Championship thanks to the sponsorship of two icons of the worldwide motorcycling: Loris Capirossi and Max Biaggi.

The Italian brand continues its growth, making progress with important technological investments and developing a top-notch Design and R&D department based in Italy.

In 2014, Suomy was acquired by a private investment fund that took ownership of the brand.

In 2019 Matteo Ferrari and in 2020 Enea Bastianini respectively won the MotoE and Moto2 world championships wearing SR-GP.

In November 2022, Suomy Helmets got on top of the world as Francesco Bagnaia conquers the title of MotoGP World Champion by wearing SR-GP.
