= Motovario =

Italian manufacturing company

Motovario S.p.A.
- Type: Public company
- Industry: Engineering
- Founded: 1965
- Founder: Giancarlo Raguzzoni
- Headquarters: Via Quattro Passi, 1/3, Formigine, Italy
- Products: mechanical speed variators; gear reducers; electric motors; motoinverters
- Subsidiaries: Italy, Germany, France, Spain, United Kingdom, Denmark, USA, China, India
- Website: motovario.com

Motovario S.p.A. is an Italian manufacturing company of power transmission components for civil and industrial applications.

== History ==
Motovario® was founded in 1965 by Giancarlo Raguzzoni in Formigine in the heart of Modena industrial district. Motovario specializes in the production of mechanical speed variators, helical and helical bevel gear reducers, shaft mounted, worm gear reducers, electric motors and motoinverters.

=== Milestones ===
In 1996 the first subsidiary, Motovario Scandinavia S/A was opened in Denmark.

In 1997 the second branch was opened in the U.S., Motovario Corporation in Alpharetta, Georgia.

In 1998 Motovario S.p.A. acquired Spaggiari Transmissioni®, a leading Italian company in the mechanical sector. The third subsidiary was opened, Motovario Limited in Birmingham, United Kingdom.

In 1999 Motovario GmbH was founded in Germany.

In 2001 the Spanish and French branches opened respectively in Barcelona and Lyon.

In 2006 Motovario Power Transmission was established in Shanghai, China.

In 2006 Motovario was taken over by the Italian investment fund Synergo SGR to manage the company's development and support its growth worldwide.

In 2011 the most recent subsidiary was founded in Kolkata, India: MOTOVARIO Gear Solutions Private Limited.

In late 2015, Motovario S.p.A. was acquired by TECO Electric & Machinery Co for 186 million euros.

=== Figures ===
The main production work is carried out in the establishments of Formigine and Ubersetto, with over 530,000 square feet of facilities and a staff of about 400.

There are 170 numerical control machines, served by LGV (Laser Guided Vehicle) lines and a whole division is dedicated to the thermal treatment that works 24 hours, 7 days a week.

An entire department is dedicated to research and development, with a test laboratory and a semi-anechoic cell specific for NVH (Noise Vibration Harshness) tests.

More than 200 employees work in branches all over the world.

Over 30 MAC, Motovario Assembly Centres, specialized assembly centers, authorized and certificated by Motovario, operate in many countries: Italy, Australia, Belgium, Belarus, Bulgaria, China, South Korea, Finland, France, India, Ireland, Israel, Lithuania, Netherlands, Poland, Portugal, United Kingdom, Spain, United States, Sweden, Turkey, Ukraine.
