= Pris-Mag =

Italian company

- Company type: Public
- Industry: Construction equipment
- Founded: 1975
- Headquarters: Vimercate, Italy
- Key people: Alessandro Sala (Chairman), Paolo Sala (CEO)
- Products: Quick change systems, hook loaders, dump trucks
- Number of employees: 120 (2011)
- Website: www.prismag.com

Pris-Mag is an Italian company which produces hook loaders, dump trucks, quick change systems and specialty equipment for industrial vehicles.

== History ==
The company was founded by Alessandro Sala in 1975 in the small industrial town of Vimercate, 10 kilometres (6.2 mi) from Milan. It was the first company in Europe that produced hook loaders.

In 1997 Pris-mag increased its production and moved to Cambiago. Its Cambiago facility covers over 50,000 m^{2} (540,000 sq ft).

Pris-Mag has a staff of more than 120 employees.
