= Iren (company) =

Italian holding company that provides public utility services

Iren S.p.A.
- Type: Società per azioni
- Traded as: FTSE Italia Mid Cap
- Industry: Utilities
- Founded: 2010; 16 years ago
- Headquarters: Reggio Emilia, Italy
- Key people: Luca Dal Fabbro (President); Gianluca Bufo (CEO
- Revenue: €5,942 million (2024)
- Net income: €268 million (2024)
- Number of employees: 11,311 (2024)
- Website: www.gruppoiren.it

Iren S.p.A. is an Italian holding company that provides public utility services. The company, headquartered in Reggio nell'Emilia, was founded on July 1, 2010. The company is listed on the Borsa Italiana in the FTSE Italia Mid Cap.

== History ==
Iren was formed on July 1, 2010, through the merger of Enìa S.p.A. and Iride S.p.A. Enìa S.p.A. was a consortium formed in 2005 comprising the utility companies in the provinces of Parma (AMPS), Piacenza (TESA), and Reggio Emilia (AGAC). Iride S.p.A., for its part, was a merger in 2006 between Azienda Energetica Metropolitana Torino (AEM Torino) from Turin and Azienda Municipalizzata Gas e Acqua (AMGA), founded in 1922 in Genoa as a gas supplier.

== Activities ==
Iren is an electricity, water, gas, and district heating supplier that also operates in the waste and wastewater disposal sectors. Over 10,500 employees serve around 2.2 million customers in energy supply, around 3 million residents in water supply and disposal, and over 3.8 million residents in waste disposal. The company is mainly active in northern Italy with operating hubs in Genoa, Parma, Piacenza, Reggio Emilia, Turin, La Spezia and Vercelli.

In 2023, Gruppo Iren produced 9,067 GWh of electricity, 73% of which came from renewable sources.

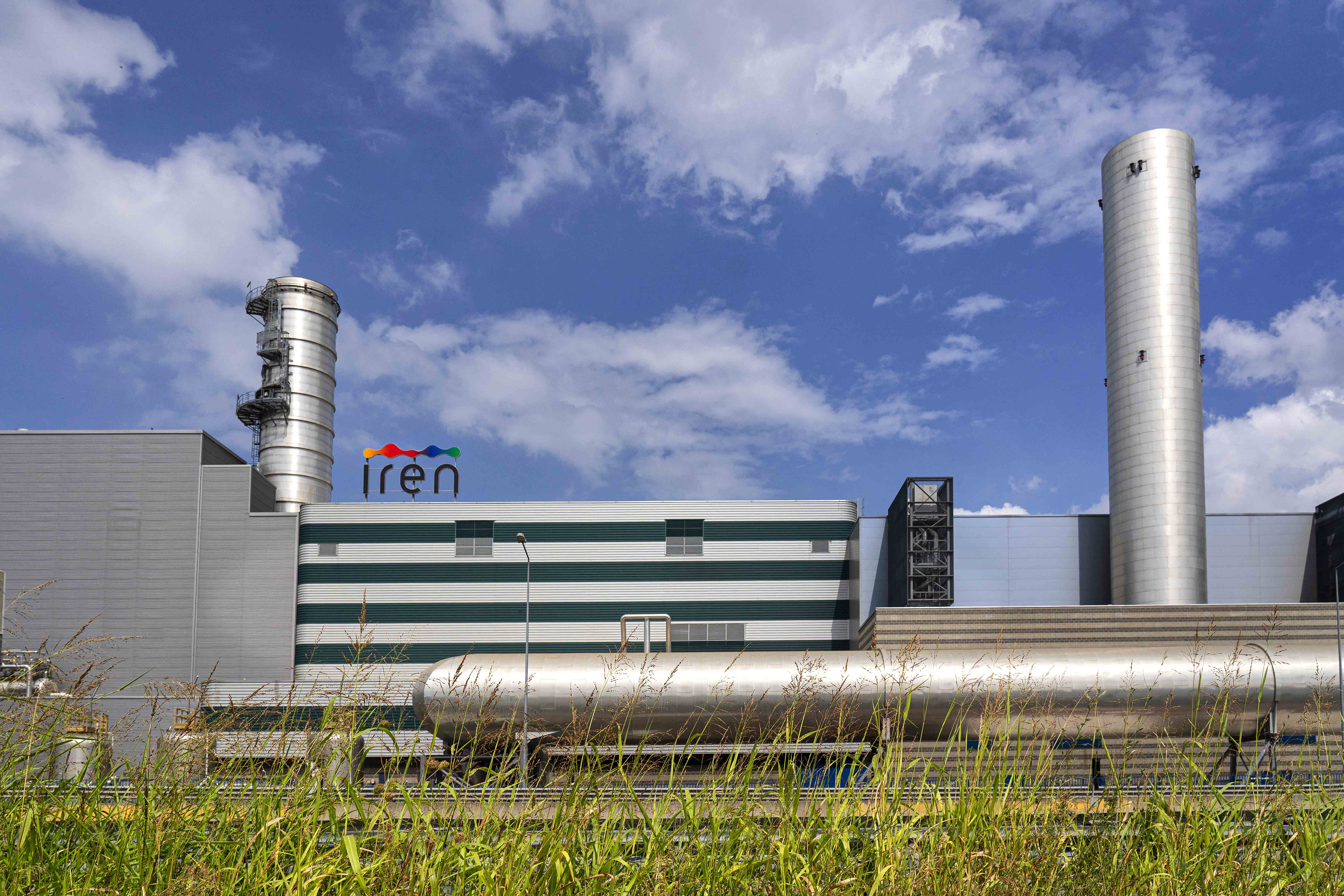
Gruppo Iren cogeneration plant in Turin

== Shareholders ==
(as of Juni 2025)

- 18.851%: City of Genoa via FSU (Finanziaria Sviluppo Utilities)
- 13.803%: City of Turin via FCTH (Finanziaria Città di Torino Holding)
- 6.423%: City of Reggio nell’Emilia
- 5.371%: Metro Holding Torino S.r.l.
- 3.848%: Intesa Sanpaolo
- 3.163%: City of Parma
- 39.11%: Free float
