= Roveredo in Piano =

Roveredo in Piano Lavoréit (Friulian)
- Comune
- Comune di Roveredo in Piano
- Coat of arms

- Location within Italy Location within Friuli-Venezia Giulia
- Coordinates: 46°1′N 12°37′E
- Country: Italy
- Region: Friuli-Venezia Giulia
- Province: Pordenone (PN)
- Frazioni: Tornielli, Villote

Government
  - Mayor: Paolo Nadal

Area
  - Total: 15.9 km^{2} (6.1 sq mi)
- Elevation: 99 m (325 ft)

Population (2007)
  - Total: 4,876
  - Density: 307/km^{2} (794/sq mi)
- Demonym: Roveredani
- Time zone: UTC+1 (CET)
  - Summer (DST): UTC+2 (CEST)
- Postal code: 33080
- Dialing code: 0434
- Patron saint: St. Bartholomew
- Saint day: August 24
- Website: Official website

Roveredo in Piano (Western Friulian: Lavorêt, locally Lavoréit) is a comune (municipality) in the Regional decentralization entity of Pordenone in the Italian region of Friuli-Venezia Giulia, located about 100 kilometres (62 miles) northwest of Trieste and about 6 km (4 mi) northwest of Pordenone.

Roveredo in Piano borders the following municipalities: Aviano, Fontanafredda, Porcia, Pordenone, San Quirino.
