= Roberts Cycles =

British bicycle manufacturer

Coordinates: 51.3850°N 0.0898°W

Roberts Cycles is a custom bicycle frame building business that was originally located in Selhurst near Croydon, South London, and is now located in Poole, England.

The business began soon after World War II when Charles (Charlie) Benjamin Roberts worked as a frame-builder for Holdsworth, Claud Butler, and Freddie Grubb. In the 1960s, Charlie founded Roberts Cycles at the family home in Sydenham. He was later joined in the workshop by his oldest son Chas, and then by his youngest son Geoff. In 1979, Charlie Roberts died unexpectedly, and Chas took over the management of the business. By then, the business had moved from Sydenham to Anerley, South London. Chas was joined by his brother Geoff and Derek Bailey, who continued to build frames.

The shop at Gloucester Road, Croydon, was closed at the end of May 2015, and Charles Roberts left the business. Roberts Cycles then relocated to the Sussex coast, where Geoff Roberts continues the family business, building and repairing frames.

Production was limited to 100 steel frames per year, and each was made in a bespoke manner to the customer's dimensions, mass, and equipment specification requirements. A mixture of Reynolds and Columbus tubing was used in construction, all of which was completed in-house. Painting was originally done in-house but was later outsourced and completed to a high standard.

The range includes bicycles built specifically for competition (road race, track), recreational (tandems, tricycles, mountain bikes, touring), and more. Bicycles bearing the name Roberts are all handmade in Sussex by Geoff Roberts using steel tube sets. Complete bicycles or frames can be built to customer specifications and the exact specific requirements of the customer.

== Early history ==
Charles (Charlie) Benjamin Roberts was born in 1920. He entered the cycle trade, at the then not unusual age of 14, working for Charlie Davey in Croydon. Davey, a successful cyclist in the 1920s, owned a shop in Addiscombe Road (Davey Cycles) and helped finance the Allin and Grubb business (South London bike builders) in 1919.

Other builders that Charlie Roberts worked for, all in South London, included Claud Butler, Freddie Grubb and Holdsworth. Contemporaries of Roberts at Claud Butler and Holdsworth included Les Ephgrave, Fred Dean, Bill Hurlow, George Stratton, Pat Skeates and Bill Philbrook – most of whom, like Roberts, subsequently set up workshops of their own.

During the war Roberts joined the Royal Air Force as a mechanic. Post-war he returned to frame building, primarily for Holdsworthy (the minor name change was the result of a split in Holdsworth into Holdsworthy and W.F. Holdsworth), where he became foreman and later works manager.

Like many of his contemporaries in the cycle trade (including Freddie Grubb and Charlie Davey), Roberts was also a competitive racing cyclist. His specialty was time trials and, according to the records of Addiscombe Cycling Club, founded by Charlie Davey in 1906, he held the Southern Road Racing Association 12 hour record from 1940 until 1959 as well as setting the South Eastern 12 hour record in 1946. While formally registered with the club, from 1940–1947, he notched up nine first places, six second places and five third places in time trials.

== Roberts Cycles, 21 Trewsbury Road, Sydenham ==
Charlie left Holdsworth in 1963 or 1964 to set up his own business. Initially all the work took place in the cellar of the Roberts family home in 21 Trewsbury Road, Sydenham and this address featured on the head crest of early Roberts frames. The CR monogram in the crest, which remains the firm’s trademark, was inspired (and was designed by his youngest son Geoff Roberts) by the logo once used by local football club Crystal Palace.

Charlie was friends with John Pratt, then owner of Geoffrey Butler Cycles of South End, Croydon, and this led to him using a shed at the back of the Geoffrey Butler shop; his son Geoff worked with him there. Roberts-built custom frames were then sold through GB Cycles, and GB branding also appeared on Roberts-built frames. Roberts also built trade frames for W.F. Holdsworth (then owned by yet another ex-Holdsworthy staffer, Roy Thame) and Condor Cycles (Gray’s Inn Road, London). Although working in GB's shed, Roberts frames still carried the original crest encircled by the same Trewsbury Road home address.

Most of the frames built in the 1960s were road racing, track and touring frames. Charlie’s sons Chas and Geoff were brought into the business at an early age, and both worked on building carrier racks and lug filing and drilling for three to five years before Geoff Roberts graduated to frame building. His elder brother, Chas Roberts managed the business after Charlie's death in 1979, until the business closed in 2015. Geoff Roberts is the sole family member (and owner) of Roberts Cycles. He continues the family business Roberts Cycles to this day from his East Sussex workshop.

== East Dulwich and Forest Hill ==
Outgrowing the shed at Geoffrey Butler’s, the Roberts workshop moved to East Dulwich but continued to use the Trewsbury Road address on head badges. Business was evidently good because Charlie and his sons were joined in the workshop by Derek Bailey, an experienced builder from Holdsworthy. Meanwhile, Charlie Roberts’ friend John Pratt had sold Geoffrey Butler’s and decided to open a new shop in Forest Hill, South London, called Phoenix Cycles. He invited Charlie Roberts to share the rent on what had been a funeral director’s premises and Charlie agreed to move his workshop again and to sell Roberts frames via the Phoenix shop. Frames built at Phoenix had either Phoenix or Roberts transfers – John Pratt recognised that Roberts was strong brand and sold bikes under both names.

This was a period when the Roberts workshop pioneered innovative frame designs. A notable change from traditional frames with narrow ‘pencil’ seat stays was the use of chunkier section seat stays, initially on track frames, a style later followed by many builders in the 70s. Another unusual Roberts design was the curved split seat tube designed to accommodate a very short wheelbase for time trial bikes.

Roberts cycles prospered at Phoenix, moving to a larger workshop at the same premises, but in 1976 John Pratt sold his business and Charlie Roberts, his sons Chas, Geoff and Derek Bailey moved from Forest Hill to new premises in nearby Penge.

== 87 Penge Road, Anerley ==
The move to the new address, 87 Penge Road, Anerley, was marked by inscribing it around the head crest used on frames. When Charlie Roberts died suddenly in 1979, his eldest son (Chas) began to manage the business with his brother (Geoff Roberts) and Derek Bailey as frame builders. They were joined by Phil Maynard, formerly of Holdsworthy, and later by Neil Brice, another Holdsworthy graduate. Bailey eventually departed for Canada. Production in Penge ran at around four to five frames per week.

The business grew and they were able to buy the neighbouring shop. As demand from club cyclists increased, the quantity of frames built for the trade declined. The 1979 Roberts catalogue lists eight models including several touring bikes, a track bicycle, a time trial frame, several road bikes and a mixte frame. It also records Charlie Roberts’ racing record, noting that he was runner up in the BBAR, rode London to Paris in the late 40s and had victories in the Bath Road ‘50’ and ‘100’.

One of the customers at the Penge shop was Maurice Burton, Britain’s first black professional cyclist, who won the UK junior sprint title in 1973 and represented England at the Commonwealth Games in 1974. For a period in the 1980s Roberts sponsored Burton supplying him with both road and track frames.

The best known rider, however, to be using a Roberts bicycle, at the time was Tony Doyle, whose Ammaco-sponsored and liveried track bikes were built in the Roberts workshop. Doyle was World Pursuit Champion in 1980 and 1986.

The introduction of new tubing ranges from Reynolds and Columbus (the Italian tubing maker) enabled Roberts to design frames with combinations of tubes from different makers, to suit varying purposes and riders – a mix-and-match approach that continues to this day.

Roberts gained a reputation and customer base for time trial and low profile frames, and for club riders in South London Roberts became synonymous with cutting edge custom frame design.

== Croydon, 89 Gloucester Road and Cycle Art Bromley ==
In 1983 Chas Roberts transferred the works to 89 Gloucester Road, Croydon. The team now included Winston Vaz, another ex-employee of Holdsworthy. Geoff Roberts eventually left to set up his own business actually buying Ron Cooper's and working with Ron before moving to his current workshop in East Sussex - even after leaving, Geoff continued building Roberts frames.

The workshop at Gloucester Road originally had no shopfront, so in 1985 Roberts Cycles, opened a shop in Bromley named Cycle Art; this shop was successful enough for Roberts to stay there beyond the initial short lease. A showroom to receive customers was also constructed at Gloucester Road.

The 21st century, notably in London, was marked not only by a cycling boom but a retro fashion that saw hand-built steel frames prized highly. This boosted orders for Roberts track frames in particular, but road and touring frames also benefited.

== Roberts mountain bikes ==
Roberts were probably the first British frame builder to construct a US-style mountain bike in the early eighties. The 1980s MTB initiative came from Jake Heilbron, the manager of West Point Cycles in Vancouver and co-founder of Canada’s Rocky Mountain Bikes and Kona Bicycle Company. Heilbron was familiar with the heavyweight mountain bikes being used in California but wanted something lighter and sprightlier so he shipped a Californian style frame to Roberts, whom he knew through Cycle Imports of Maine, and asked them to make something similar.

Roberts established a name for high-end mountain bike design. Their familiarity with lugless frame building made it relatively easy for Roberts to accommodate the new dimensions of tubing from Reynolds and Columbus as well as build frames with sloping top tubes – an innovation that was not available on any of the US or Far Eastern bikes for sale in the UK at the time.

UK and off-road world champions were measured up for frames: both Dave Baker and Tim Gould rode Roberts-built frames to victory, although they were badged as Peugeots (their sponsor). The first Roberts mountain bike catalogue featured the top of the range White Spider (named after the north face of the Eiger), the mid-range Black Leopard, an off-road tourer, the Rough Stuff; and the Transcontinental, a long range tourer. Short-lived off-road models included the Cobra, Stratos and Phantom. One example of the White Spider was built as a companion bike for purchasers of Aston Martin cars – sprayed in a colour to match the owner’s car.

After this Roberts developed one of their most sought-after models, the D.O.G.S.B.O.L.X, which featured a hooped rear end that dealt better with the stresses of rim brakes. The frame evolved over the years but most models were produced with Columbus Max biaxial tubing. As disc brakes became popular, steel frames fell out of fashion, but more recently in 2020 the design has been revisited and the DOGSBOLX 1Evo is once again in the range of bikes that Roberts Cycles (Geoff Roberts) produces in Sussex - The "1" is a reference to the 1x chainring that the bike employs and the "Evo" refers to the modern bolt-thru axle and disc brake configuration.

Another design revisited recently is the Rough Stuff - the new RS 1Evo is a bespoke off-road adventure/gravel/touring frameset, produced from Roberts Cycles owner Geoff Roberts, in East Sussex.

== Road, touring and track ==
While Roberts set the pace in mountain bikes from Croydon, low profiles, road bikes and touring frames continued to be built from the 1980s and into the new century. International tourist and writer Josie Dew chose to ride a Roberts, giving the brand an unexpected boost.

A low profile Aston Martin bicycle was built in collaboration with Mike Burrows (who built the Lotus frames for world champion Chris Boardman) with streamlined tubing and a streamlined seat tube – although Roberts had built "aero" tubed frames much earlier than this. In an interview with the authors of Made in England It was mentioned that Roberts bikes were built for royalty, but did not identify who these aristocratic customers were.

More recently Geoff Roberts of Roberts Cycles produces the bespoke RR Evo - an up-to-date road frame that features bolt-thru axles, disc brakes and the lightest Columbus tubing. Touring bikes and lugged frames are both still available, in the East Sussex workshop, of Roberts Cycles.

== See also ==
- Ron Cooper (bicycle framebuilder)
- Witcomb Cycles, another South London frame builder until 2009
- List of bicycle manufacturing companies
