= Ron Cooper =

Ron Cooper may refer to:

- Ron Cooper (artist) (born 1943), American artist
- Ron Cooper (American football) (born 1962), American football coach
- Ron Cooper (Australian footballer) (1911–1991), Australian footballer for Carlton and North Melbourne
- Ron Cooper (bicycle framebuilder) (1932–2012), British bicycle builder
- Ron Cooper (boxer) (1928–2023), British Olympic boxer
- Ron Cooper (English footballer) (1938–2018), English footballer for Peterborough
- Ronald Cooper (born 1958), former NASCAR driver
