= Pinarello =

Italian bicycle manufacturer

Coordinates: 45.6982616°N 12.2529689°E

- Type: Private
- Industry: Bicycle industry
- Founded: 1953; 73 years ago, Treviso
- Founder: Giovanni Pinarello
- Headquarters: Treviso, Italy
- Area served: Worldwide
- Products: Bicycles, E-bike and related components
- Website: pinarello.com

Cicli Pinarello S.p.A. is an Italian bicycle manufacturer based in Treviso, Italy. Founded in 1953, it supplies mostly handmade bicycles for the road, track, E-bikes (NYTRO), mountain bikes and cyclo-cross. They also produce an in-house component brand – MOST.

== History ==
Giovanni Pinarello was born in Catena di Villorba, Italy in 1922. He was the eighth of 12 brothers. At the age of 15, Giovanni began making bicycles at the factory of Paglianti. After a successful amateur career he turned professional in 1947, aged 25. Pinarello died on 4 September 2014.

In December 2016, Pinarello sold a majority stake for a reported €90-million (US$134-million) in equity value to investment management firm L Catterton with Alantra acting as their advisor. In June 2023, L Catteron sold their stake for an estimated US$175-million to Ivan Glasenberg, the Swiss-South African billionaire and former chief executive officer of Glencore, with Houlihan Lokey acting as the advisor for the seller.

Originally, all Pinarello frames were steel. Pinarello used Columbus tubing for most of the 1980s but with tubing by Oria in the lower models in 1989. The first non-Italian tube was Tange Prestige for the US-based Levis Cycling team headed by Michael Fatka and ridden by Andrew Hampsten, Steve Tilford, Roy Knickmann, Thurlow Rogers in the mid-1980s. As noted above, the Banesto Line introduced in 1993 exclusively utilized Oria tubing: Oria Cromovan, Oria ML34, and Oria ML25. Throughout the 1990s until 2004, Pinarello produced frames from conventional steel tubing using lugs, oversize tubing, oversize aluminium with TIG welded joints, magnesium and frames of carbon fiber and other materials.

== Models ==
=== Historical models ===
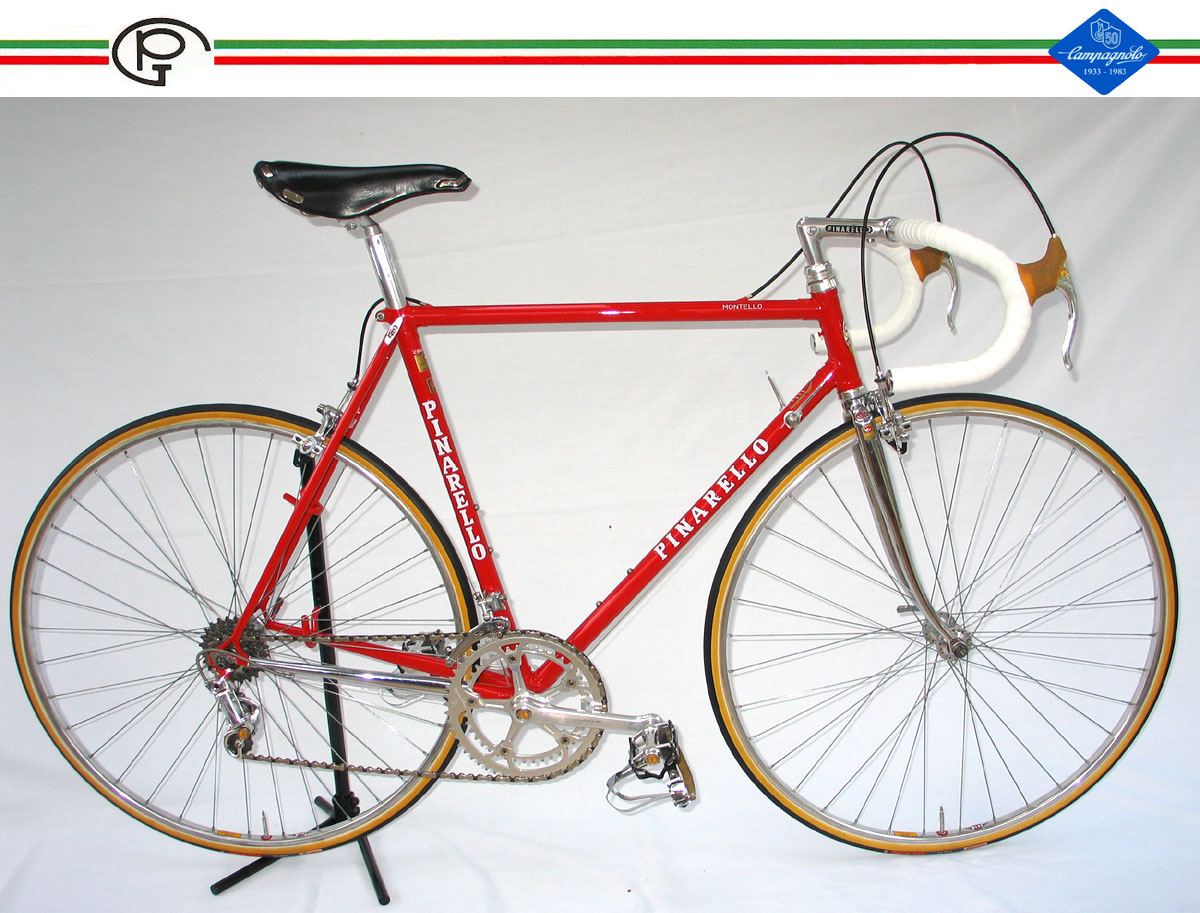
Pinarello Montello with Campagnolo 50th Groupset

The Pinarello Montello SLX was a landmark model for Pinarello as this was the frame with which Pinarello achieved their first major pro victories. This model frame was one of the most responsive of the mid to late 1980s as shown by wins in events such as the Vuelta a España, the Giro d'Italia and stages of the Tour de France. The Montello had a brake cable through the top tube, chrome sloping front fork and chrome on the drive side chain stay; later models had the full rear triangle chromed. The Montello SLX was in red, blue and Spumoni. Pinarellos from the mid-1980s often have the decals restored by owners as factory-applied decals were prone to flaking off. The Montello was available in 2 versions: frame from Columbus SL with SLX fork, or fabricated from Columbus full SLX double butted tubing with rifling down the inside center. The bottom bracket was investment cast with the Pinarello logo and the dropouts were by Campagnolo. Braze-ons for down-tube shifters, front derailleur and two water bottles were provided. The GPT logo (for Giovanni Pinarello, Treviso) appeared in many locations.

The Pinarello Treviso was the second-in-line model under the Montello SLX in the mid-to-late '80's. Built with Columbus SL tubing, it featured a painted fork and seat stays, with chromed chain stays. This model also featured the sloping fork crown. On the road it is easily distinguished from the Montello by the single chrome chain stay. However, some older models of the Treviso (1981) did not have the chrome chain stay.

After the Montello SLX, Pinarello departed from his standard production design with parallel seat and head tube angles and created the Gavia. This provided more saddle setback than the Montello or other Pinarello designs. Greg LeMond, the winner of the Tour de France in 1986, 1989 and 1990, promoted designs that pushed the saddle further back. The Gavia was constructed of Columbus TSX tubing. This model was available in red, blue with pearl white panels and pearl white with fluorescent splatter.

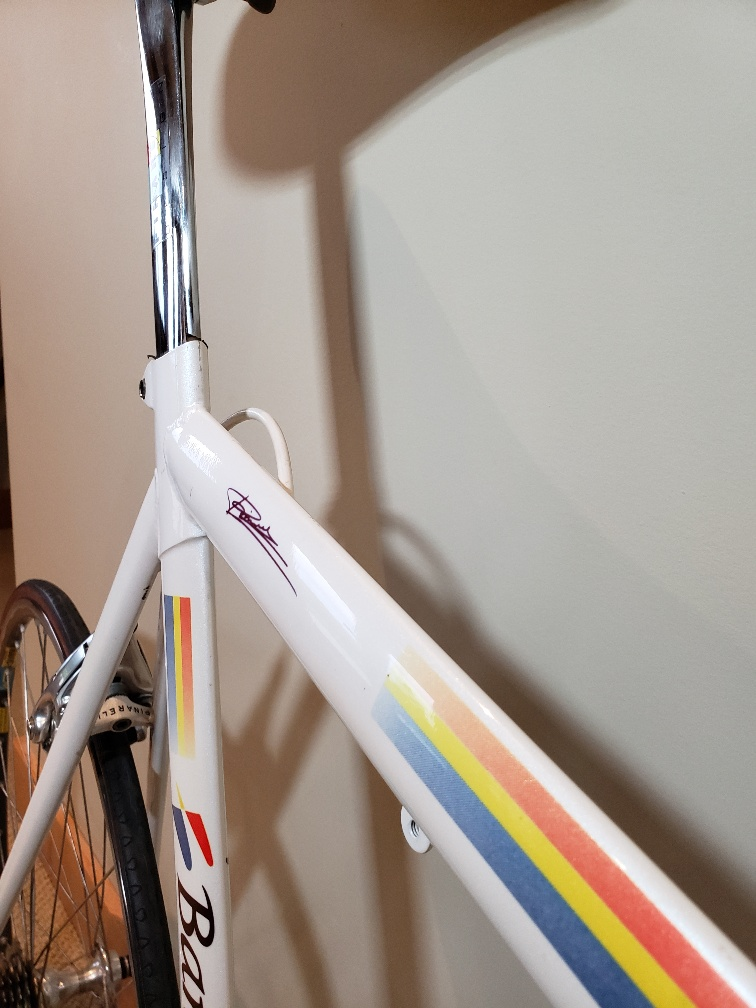
Indurain's custom steel Pinarello TT bike with aero tubing and seatpost

The Banesto Line was released in 1993 following Miguel Indurain's first two Tour de France (1991 and 1992) and first Giro d'Italia (1992) wins. Based upon Indurain's preference, all Banesto Line frames were constructed with Oria tubing. The Banesto Line was headlined by Indurain's Time Trial bike, debuting at the 1992 Giro with a remarkable advance in steel frames as it featured Tig welded custom aerodynamic tubing and custom aerodynamic seat post with internal shifter and brake cable routing. This TT bike represented an early example, possibly the first, of experimentation with airfoil tubing in the pro peloton. Only three of these TT framesets are known to have been constructed. Prior to the 1992 Giro, Indurain had ridden a Banesto painted TT bike with a round tubeset. The Banesto Line included the Tig welded Ciclo Cromovan Record 93, the Ciclo ML 34 Record 93 with a chromed fork and chrome rear triangle as well as the Ciclo ML 25 Veloce 93. The Banesto Line were supplied with Campagnolo components, Mavic rims, Aci Inox spokes, Vittoria tires, ITM handlebars and Indurain's preferred Selle Italia Turbo saddles. Riding his Pinarello Banesto Line bicycles, Indurain was the last cyclist to win the Tour on a steel bicycle. In 1997, the steel Banesto Line had changed from the white frames to utilize standard Pinarello blue and white color schemes along with Banesto badging on the downtube. In 1998, the Banesto Line included the new Paris aluminum frameset and updated Pinarello logo.

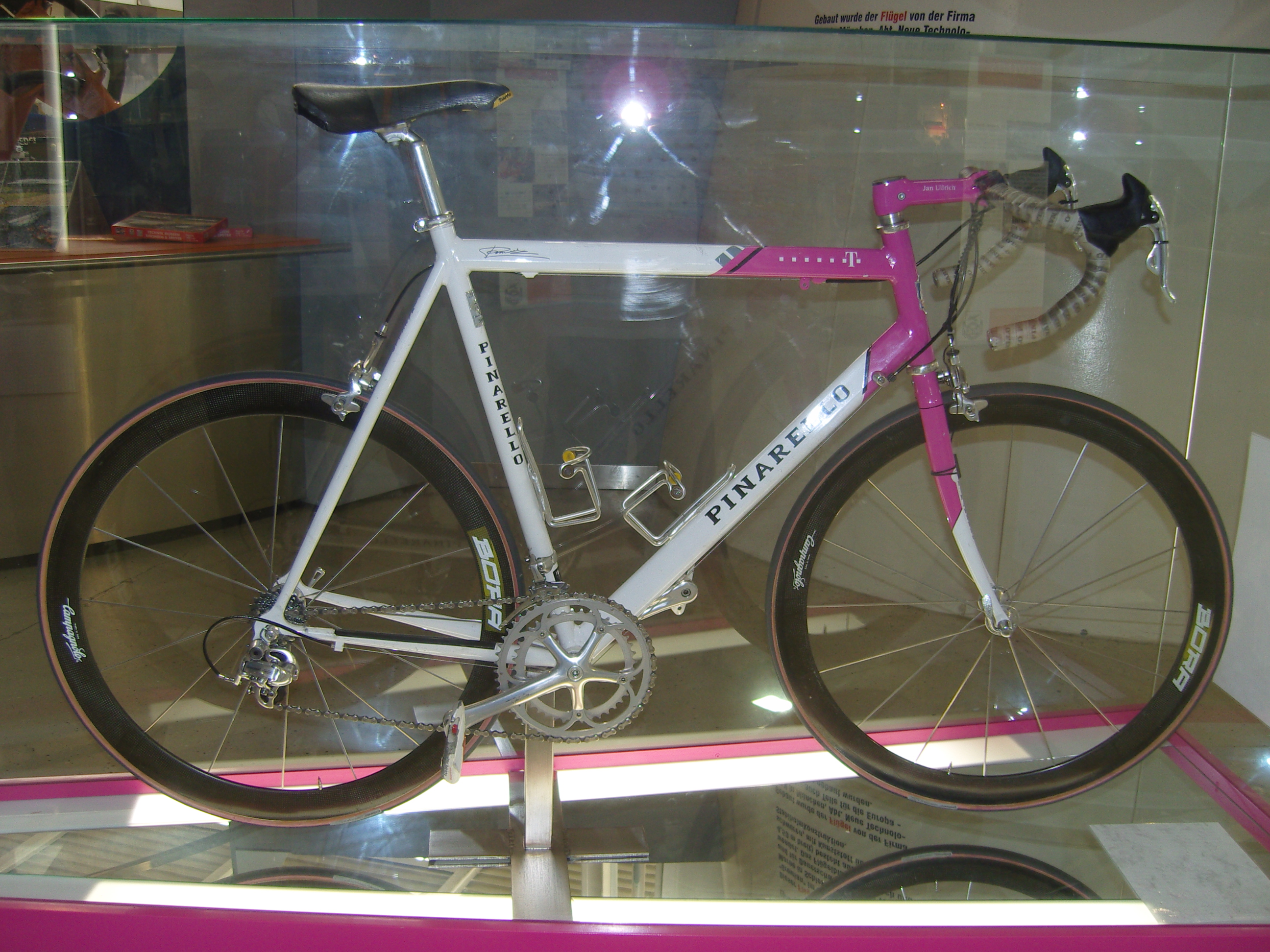
Jan Ullrich's 1997 Tour de France winning Paris FP

The Pinarello Paris in the mid-1990s was a 7005 series aluminium bike with an aluminium fork later replaced by the aria carbon fork. It was upon this frame that Jan Ullrich and Bjarne Riis won the Tour de France. Winner of the 2007 Editor's Choice award for a road racing bicycle from Bicycling Magazine, the Pinarello Paris FP was the premier monocoque, high modulus, unidirectional carbon fiber frame. In 2009, the FP6 replaced the Paris FP and F4:13. The monocoque frame used the same mold as the Paris FP, but with different carbon fiber (30HM3K). Pinarello had been slow to jump aboard the all-carbon juggernaut, preferring to concentrate on its highly regarded magnesium-frame technology, as showcased in the Dogma series of bikes. But the attraction and momentum of carbon was unavoidable, and while the all-carbon F4:13 hadn't displaced the Dogma at the top of Pinarello's line-up, it was clearly a serious and purposeful attempt to use the material's properties to best advantage, starting with one-piece main frame construction to exploit carbon's stiffness and low weight.

=== Contemporary road models ===
The Pinarello FP Uno was the current base model bicycle built by Pinarello evolving from its predecessor, the FP1. The FP Uno featured hydroformed asymmetric 6061 T6 triple butted aluminium tubing. The next superior model was the Pinarello FP Due. Like the FP Uno, this had evolved from its predecessor, the FP2. The frame was constructed from 24HM12K carbon fibre. The Pinarello FP Quattro was built from 30HM12K carbon fibre and featured carbon asymmetric stays with an Onda carbon fork. The Quattro also utilised the new iCR internal cable routing system, which had been developed in-house, by Pinarello.

The Pinarello Neor replaced the FP Uno as Pinarellos base road bike model, featuring the same hydroformed aluminum frame as the FP Uno, but now boasted a carbon fibre rear triangle, as well as ONDA carbon fork. The Pinarello FPTEAM Carbon was constructed from 24HM12K uni-directional carbon fibre and featured both a tapered 1 "1/8 1" 1/4 ONDA fork and ONDA rear triangle. The Pinarello Rahza was a full 24HM12K carbon fibre frame, featuring an asymmetrical monocoque design, which improved frame rigidity. The frame also featured an ONDA fork and rear stays as well as the BB30 bottom bracket. The Pinarello Marvel was an entirely new asymmetry frame originating from the Pinarello Paris (constructed from Torayca 50HM1.5 carbon fibre) made from 30HM12K carbon. Rigidity of the frame was further improved by the usage of a tapered headset (1" 1/8 - 1" 1/2) as well as featuring internal cable routing. Pinarello said that the Marvel was a "top level bike and already UCI approved for use in official competitions." The Marvel also made full use of the Think2 system, allowing the usage of both electronic and mechanical groupsets. Other new features included the new ONDA2V front fork and a new aerodynamic downtube.

==== GAN series ====
For 2016 Pinarello updated their product line starting with new mid-level bikes up to models just below the Dogma Series. All GAN Series models took styling and design cues from the Dogma F8. The entry level GAN stemmed directly from the design efforts of the Dogma F8, whilst having a less 'extreme' style which aided riding comfort. The GAN Disk variant contained the same features as the GAN but also included disk brakes; both models were manufactured from T600 carbon fibre. The GAN S featured an all-T700 carbon fibre frame, whilst still maintaining design features akin to the F8. The top of the class model was the GAN RS which featured a higher-strength T900 Toray carbon.

==== Dogma series ====
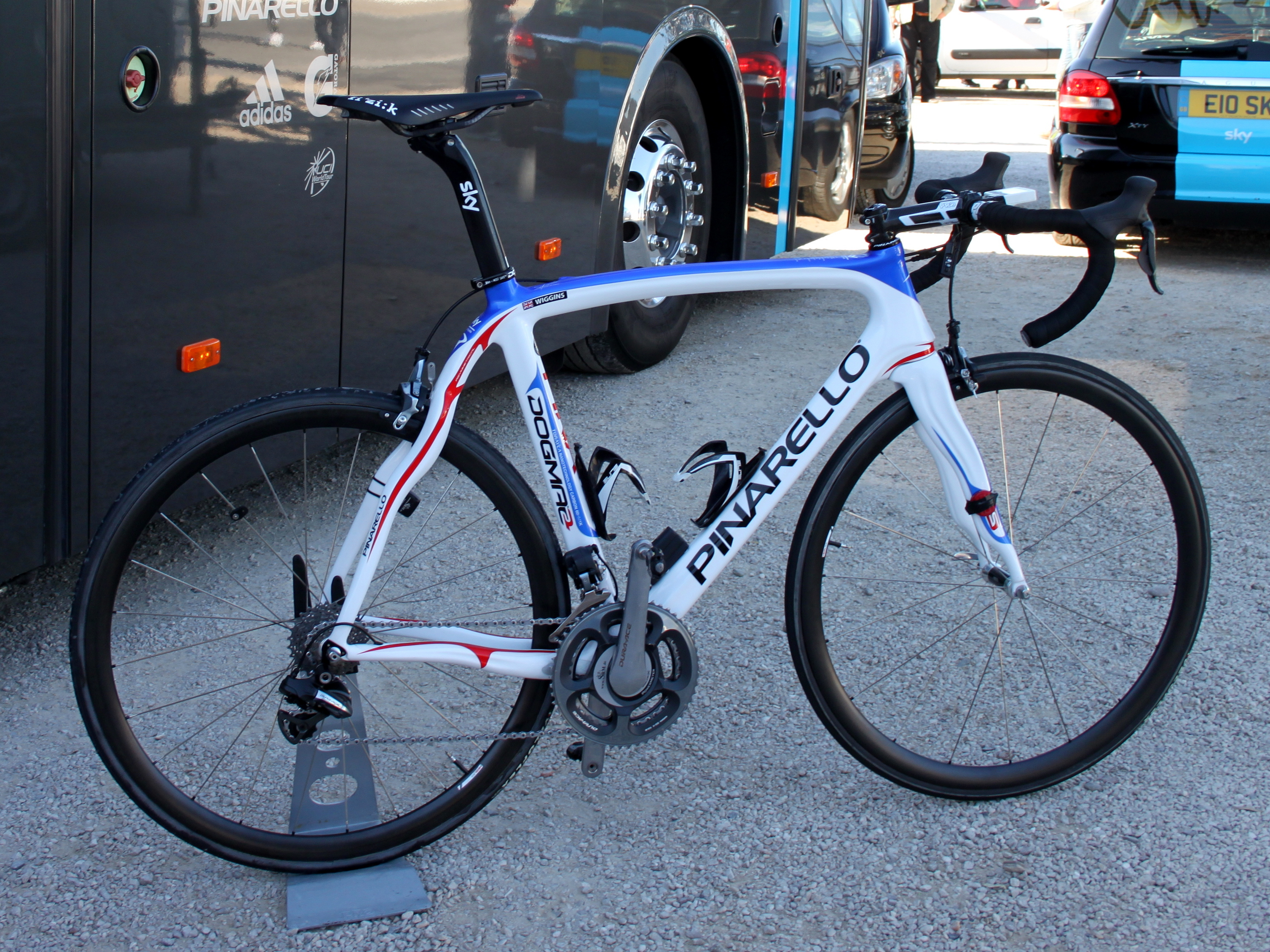
The Dogma2 Bradley Wiggins rode at the 2012 Volta ao Algarve

The Pinarello Dogma was the company's top-of-the-line model, the first bicycle of a 'new generation' of frames. It was the successor to the Pinarello Prince range, released for sale to the public in 2010. The frame had a completely asymmetric design made entirely of 60HM1K carbon fibre, with the right hand side of the Dogma frame different in shape and section to that of the left side, thus providing increased rigidity against forces placed upon the frame by pedalling.

In 2011, the successor to the Dogma, the Pinarello Dogma 2 was revealed at the 2011 Tour de France. The Dogma 2 featured aerodynamic improvements which increased the efficiency of the frame. Bradley Wiggins rode the Dogma 2 to victory in the 2012 Tour de France. In 2012, mountain bike trials rider, Martyn Ashton, created a video in which he performed several tricks and stunts on a Dogma 2. The video, entitled "Road Bike Party", went viral, gaining over half a million views in one day, and it has currently had over fourteen million views on YouTube.

The Pinarello Dogma K featured Pinarello"s 'Century Ride' geometry, using frame design that provided increased comfort without compromising overall performance. As with other modern Pinarellos, the frame incorporated an asymmetrical design which offset the asymmetric forces created by pedalling. The Dogma K and the Dogma frame differed from each other in the angle of the seat tube, brought back to increase shock absorption, and reduced head tube angle, as well as slightly longer chain stays to increase comfort. Furthermore, a longer wheelbase made for a frame that is less rigid vertically, improving shock absorption. The Pinarello ROKH frame was made in an effort to offer the excellent performance of the DOGMA K to a wider group of cyclists. The ROKH's geometry was similar in shape and construction but with an even longer wheel base to add even more vertical compliance than the Dogma K. The Dogma K Hydro mirrored the new model variation seen with the Dogma 65.1, whereby hydraulic disc brakes had now been added. The Hydro featured a new ONDA HD (Hydraulic Disc) fork, as well as new chainstays accommodating the RAD braking system seen on both the DOGMA XC and Dogma 65.1 Hydro.

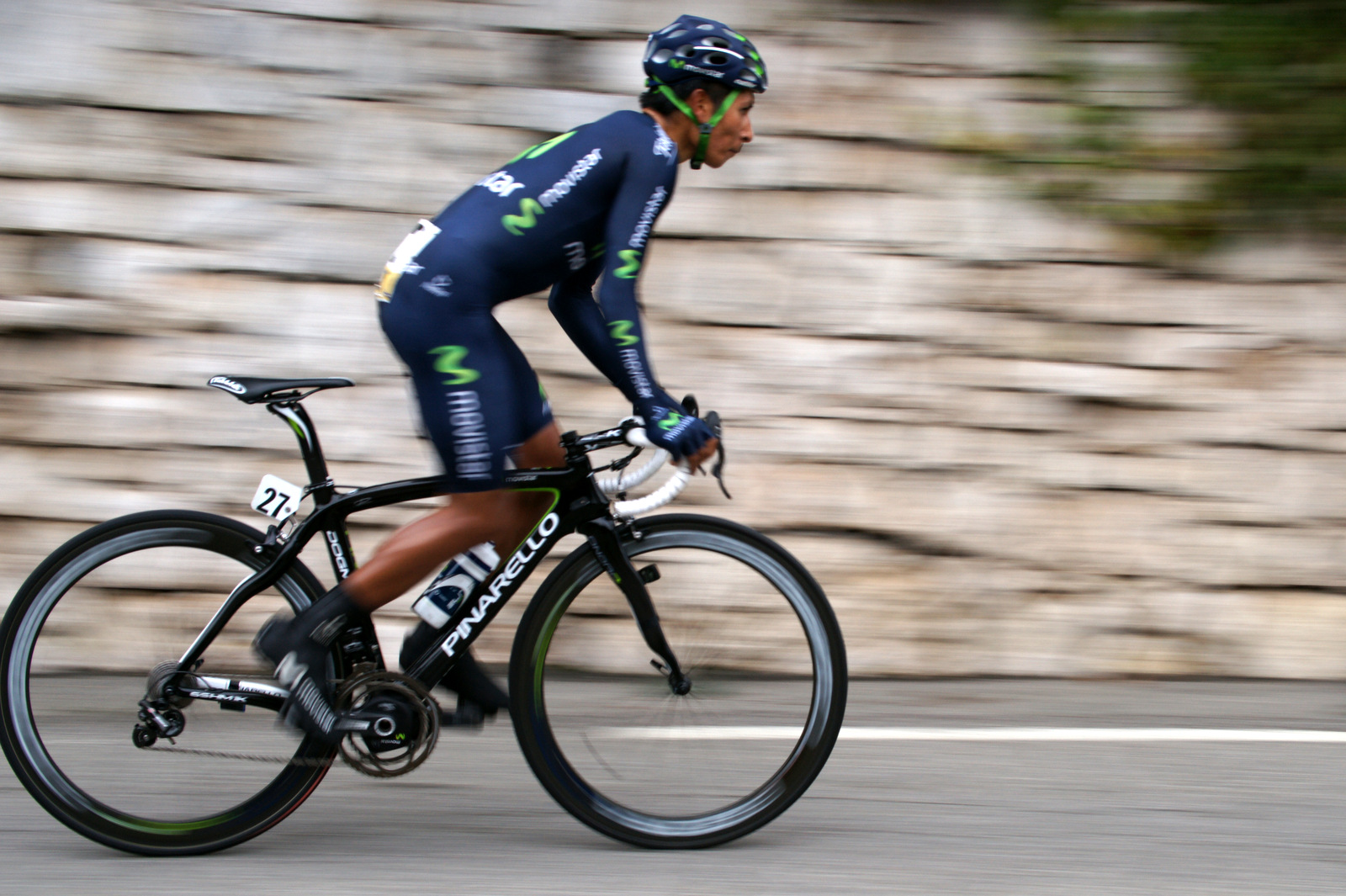
Nairo Quintana on his Dogma 65.1 Think2 at the 2013 Paris–Nice

The 2013 generation of the Dogma bicycle was the Dogma 65.1 Think2. When compared to the Dogma2, the Think2 featured stronger and more rigid carbon fibre, 65HM1K, yielding a more reactive frame. Moreover, the Think2 had been built with the new electronic shifting groupsets in mind, and thus had internal cable routing for both Shimano and Campagnolo systems. The 2014 Dogma 65.1 Hydro variant of the Dogma was virtually the same as the 2013 Think2 model, made from Torayca 65Ton HM 1K carbon fibre with "Nanoalloy technology". The Hydro however, accommodated hydraulic disc brakes and featured a new front fork developed from the previous ONDA2 fork, called the ONDA HD (Hydraulic Disk). The frame also featured new chainstays which accommodated the new RAD braking system, derived from the development of the Dogma XC. Chris Froome rode the Dogma 65.1 Think2 to victory in the 2013 Tour de France.

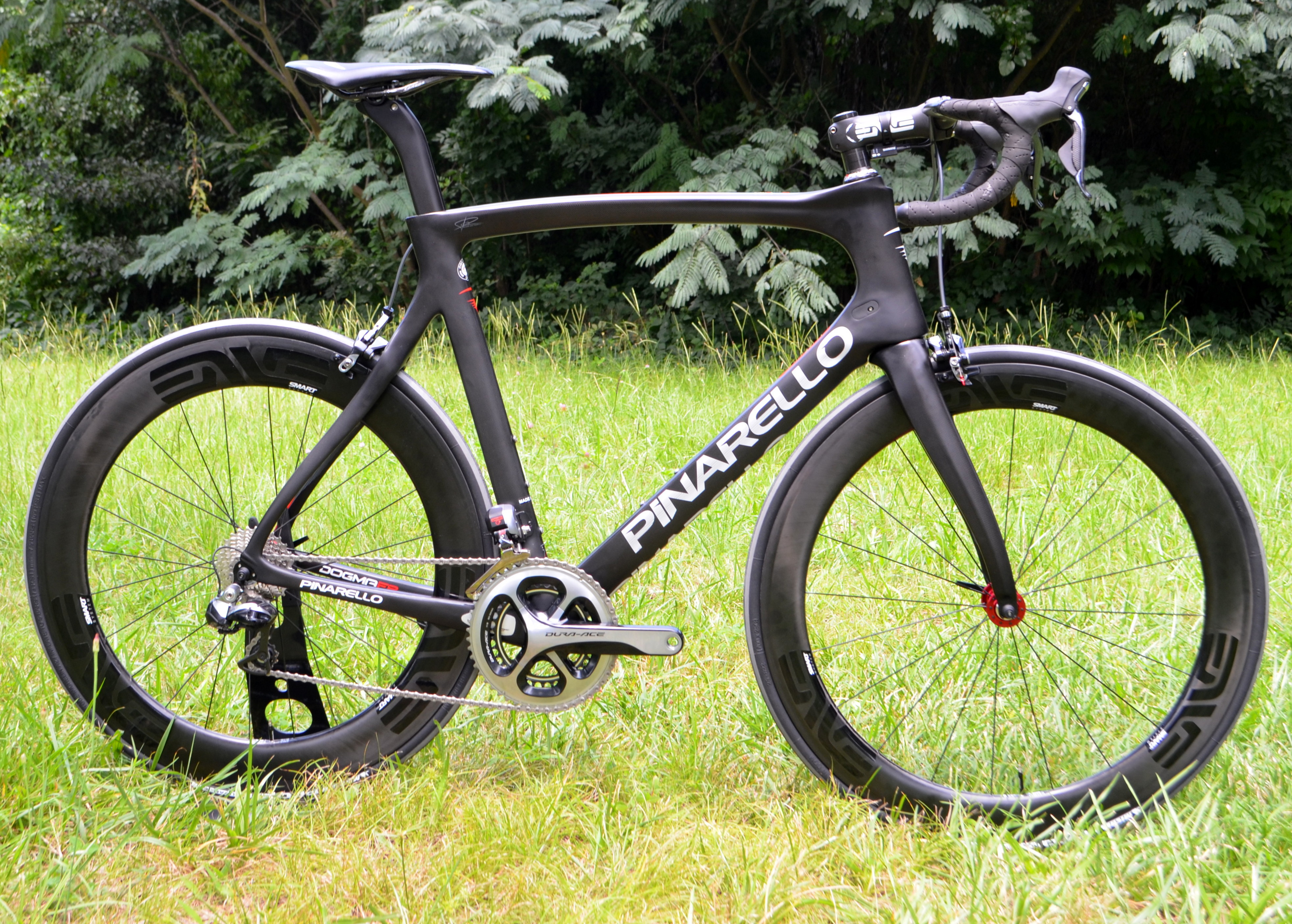
Dogma F8 with Shimano Dura Ace Di2 and Enve 6.7 Wheelset

In May 2014 the Pinarello Dogma F8 (8th generation) was revealed as part of the company's 2015 product launch. The new bike was developed in conjunction with Team Sky sponsor and car manufacturer Jaguar and took design cues (such as the front fork shape) from the Bolide time trial bike. Research advancements had led to claimed aerodynamic gains, with the F8 being 26.1% more aerodynamic than the Dogma 65.1, 6.4% more aerodynamic when including the bike rider and the frameset alone being 40% more aerodynamically efficient than the predecessor. The bike was expected to debut at the 2014 Critérium du Dauphiné.

In April 2015, just days ahead of the Tour of Flanders Pinarello, along with Jaguar-Land Rover and Netcompany–Ineos, unveiled the Dogma K8-S – a replacement for the cobble-focused Dogma K. The most striking aspect of the new bike was the rear suspension system, dubbed the Dogma Suspension System, which could provide up to 10mm of travel; this however, was not the first time road bikes had been fitted with suspension. The bike was designed in conjunction with Jaguar and featured the aerodynamic fork from the Dogma F8, which in conjunction with the suspension system was claimed to reduce vibrations by 50%, with data from Jaguar-Land Rover showing an increase in speed of 8% and a reduction in energy usage of 10%. A version of the bike would also be made which did not have the suspension system built in - the Dogma K8. In May 2015, the company launched the Dogma F8 Disk in preparation for the UCI's review on the use of disk brakes in road competitions. The bike was essentially the same as the standard F8 in terms of performance and characteristics. In December 2015, the company launched a limited edition variant of the F8, the Dogma F8w, which used the wireless SRAM RED eTap groupset. In 2016, just before the 2016 Tour de France the company launched the Dogma F8 Xlight.

In January 2017, the company revealed its new flagship bike, the Dogma F10. Unlike in previous years, where Pinarello had unveiled their new products to coincide with the Giro d'Italia, the F10 was revealed before the start of the 2017 season. The Netcompany–Ineos team-bikes were equipped with Shimano's newest 9150 Dura-Ace Di2 groupset, whilst Pinarello claimed the F10 was 6.3% lighter and 7% stiffer than its predecessor (still composed of Torayca T1100 1K carbon), whilst a 53 cm unpainted frame had a claimed weight of only 820g. The F10 also had a 12.6% claimed aerodynamic advantage over the F8, coming in part from the 'concave' back shaped aerofoils (also found on the second version of the Bolide time trial bike). The F10 also had a number of aerodynamic devices which had been taken from other models, the aforementioned Bolide, as well as Bradley Wiggins' hour record bike. Only hours after its release, Taiwanese bike manufacturer - Velocite - claimed that new F10 and the second version of the Bolide infringed on three of its patents. The F10 would also be available to the public immediately. During the 2017 Giro d'Italia a number of Team Sky riders tested the Dogma F10 X-Light - a lightweight version of the F10 - in readiness for the 2017 Tour de France. Pinarello claimed an unpainted X-Light weighed in at 760g for a 53 cm-sized frame. In mid-July the company announced the Dogma F10 Disc would be produced for sale. A day later the company revealed the Dogma K10, taking aerodynamic and visual cues from the F10 forebear and the electronically-controlled suspension variant, the Dogma K10S Disk.

In May 2019, the company revealed the successor to the Dogma F10, the Dogma F12 which was launched alongside Team Ineos.

=== Time trial and triathlon models ===
Following the success of Pinarello's first experiment with aero tubing in Indurain's 1992 Banesto Line time trial bike, Pinarello developed the carbon monocoque Espada with input from Formula 1 expert Giacchi for the 1994 Hour Record attempt. This was Pinarello's first carbon frame. Indurain succeeded in setting a new standard on the Espada by breaking 53 kph for the first time with a mark of 53.040 kph. Indurain gained further success on the Espada in the 1995 Tour de France, winning both long time trials, before returning to a Banesto Line frame to win the 1996 Summer Olympic time trial.

The Pinarello Montello FP8 was a time trial bicycle manufactured by Pinarello prior to the introduction of the Graal. It was made with aerospace grade carbon fibre composite. The 50HM3K carbon fibre created an ultra-stiff and light ride. The Pinarello Graal was a time trial frame manufactured by Pinarello. The Graal was designed using CFD techniques, maximizing the efficiency of the bicycle. The frame was available in both an electronic version and mechanical version, with the electronic version featuring an internally-mounted battery. The Pinarello Bolide was released on 2 May 2013 with gains of a 15% reduction in aerodynamic drag and 5% reduction in weight over the Graal. Team Sky's 2012 Tour de France winner Sir Bradley Wiggins used the new bike at the 2013 Giro d'Italia. The Bolide had been in development for over a year with both Pinarello lab technicians and Team Sky working on the bike. The Bolide used aeroplane wing-shaped tubular sections in conjunction with a 'concave back' on the seat tube. This allowed the rear wheel and frame to be closer together. In addition, the brakes were shielded behind leading small fairings and the frame utilized integrated cabling to further minimize drag.

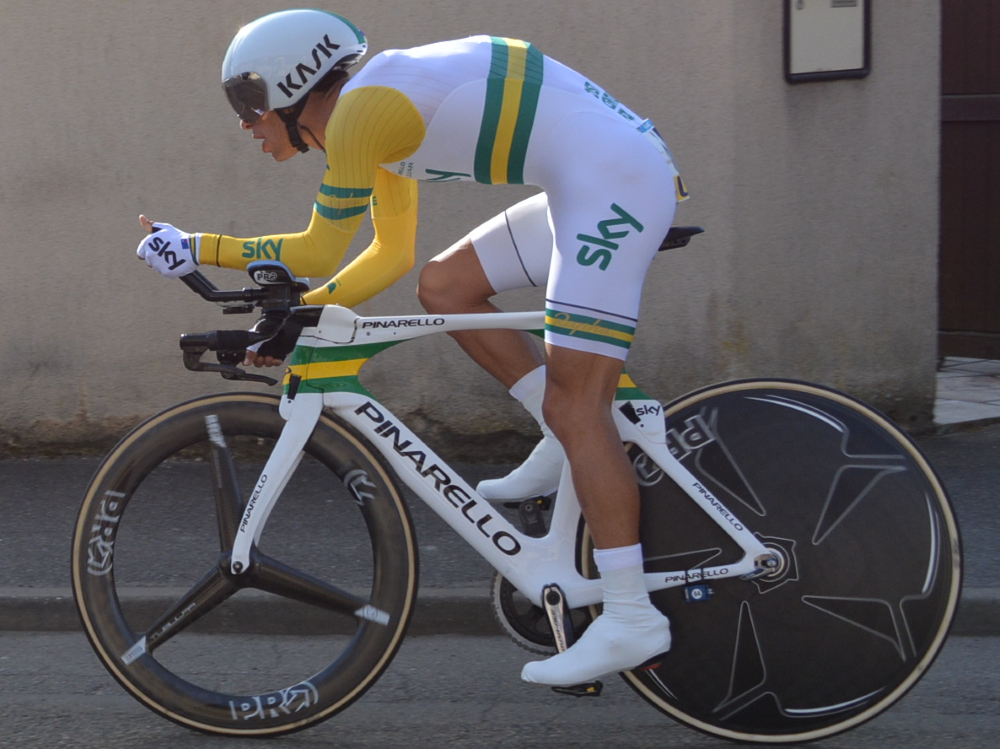
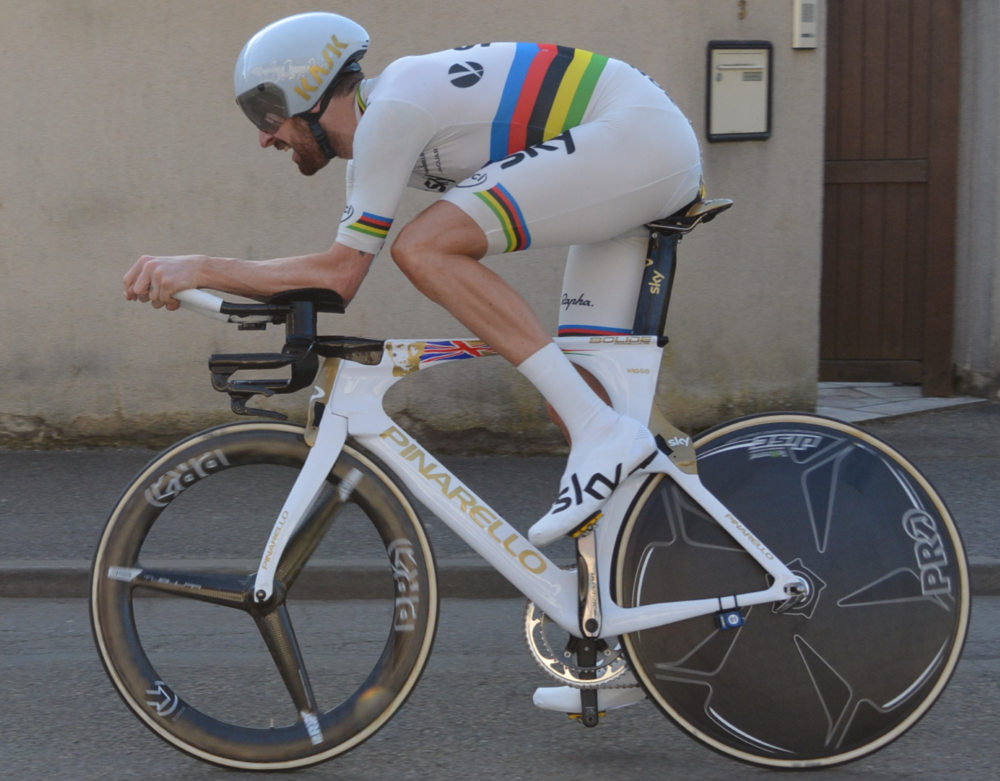
Porte, in his national time trial champion's jersey, onboard his custom painted Bolide (left) Bradley Wiggins, wearing the rainbow skinsuit at the 2015 Paris–Nice, onboard his custom Bolide (right)

On 21 June 2013 Pinarello released their second (in-house developed) high end time trial frame within two months, called the Pinarello Sibilo. The Sibilo would debut at the 2013 Tour de France with Alejandro Valverde of Movistar Team. Early impressions were that the Sibilo shared some common features with the Bolide, such as: airfoil tubing, track-style rear dropouts and a 'concave back'. Moreover, the Sibilo carried some aerodynamic refinements over the Bolide, for example, the front brake was further integrated into the fork and the rear brake had been moved toward the chainstays. These modifications removed the need for the brake fairings which were seen on the Bolide. The Sibilo was constructed from the same Torayca 65HM1K carbon as the Bolide, with internal cable routing for extra aerodynamic benefit. The Sibilo utilized the stiff BB86 bottom bracket and could also accommodate both mechanical groupsets such as the Shimano Dura-Ace and Campagnolo Super Record sets, as well as their electronic variants (Dura-Ace Di2 and Campagnolo EPS). The Pinarello Xirion was designed specifically for triathletes by utilizing favorable frame geometry and was made from 24HM Unidirectional carbon fibre. The Xirion was sold as a complete bicycle fitted with Vision cycling components.

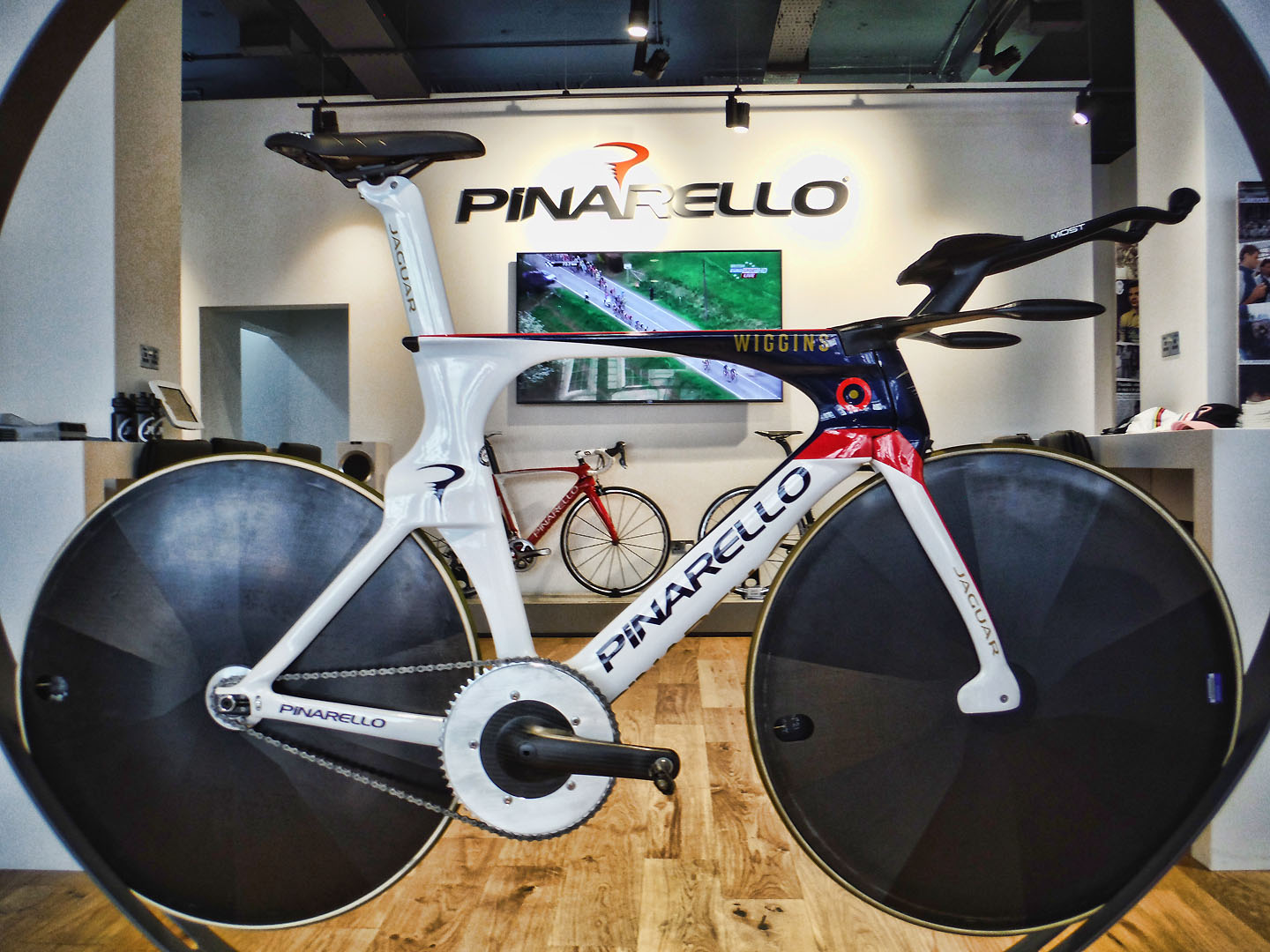
Bradley Wiggins' modified Bolide HR he used for his successful Hour Record attempt

In light of Bradley Wiggins' hour record attempt, Pinarello collaborated with Jaguar to produce the Bolide HR. The HR variant had an aero-optimised front fork, seat stays and dropouts. The bike also featured printed titanium bars. In 2015, the endurance part of the Italian national cycling team received Bolide HR bikes. At the 2016 UCI Track Cycling World Championships, Filippo Ganna rode his Bolide HR to victory in the Individual Pursuit.

In May 2016, three years after its initial introduction, the Pinarello Bolide TT was released exclusively to Team Sky. The first race-ready model of the bike would be given to Mikel Landa for use on the Stage 9 time trial at the 2016 Giro d'Italia.

=== Gravel and Cyclocross Models ===
In 2018, due to the expansion of off-road gravel racing and riding, Pinarello introduced the Grevil, an aerodynamic gravel racing bike featuring disc brakes, expanded tire clearance, and a wavy, asymmetrical design consistent with the brand's distinctive styling. Cycling publication BikeRadar, in a review, stated that the bike was fast and enjoyable to ride, but the prohibitive price point and firm ride quality made it a better choice for high-level racers than an amateur weekend rider. In 2022, Pinarello released an updated Grevil, the Grevil F, which featured aerodynamic improvements in the form of a flattened downtube and the adoption of the Total Internal Cable routing (TCR) used in its Dogma superbikes. The brand claimed that the updated model was 4% more aerodynamic and saved five more watts at 40 km/h than the older model. Other modifications included geometry alterations to help riders battle fatigue in longer races.

Cyclocross riders have been riding Pinarello bikes since the 1980s, though these were little more than road bikes equipped with knobbier tires. In 2022, the brand unveiled its first dedicated CX bike in 30 years, the Crossista F, in preparation for the 2022 UCI CX World Championship. The bike, designed in collaboration with British Ineos Grenadiers rider and CX World Champion Tom Pidcock, was modelled after the brand's aerodynamic road bikes, with slightly improved tire clearance, water drainage holes in the frame, and altered geometry to make for easier handling in off-road courses with mud and sand. Pidcock rode the bike to victory in the 2022 CX World Championship, and as of 2025 the Crossista F was still in production.

=== Mountain Models ===
Though most well-known for its road bikes, Pinarello has in recent years expanded its range to include mountain bikes. In 2012, mountain bike publications received rumors of an off-road bike from the brand, the Dogma XC. Released in 2013, the XC was, as the name suggests, designed for Cross Country (XC) racing. A hardtail with 100mm of front suspension travel and 29-inch wheels, the Dogma was made out of hi-mod 60T Toray 1K woven carbon to strengthen it for the high-impact nature of off-road racing. The bike was received well among the XC community, and stayed in production for six years before being in 2019.

In 2023, Pinarello unveiled an updated Dogma XC, completely redesigned and available in both hardtail and full-suspension models. Designed in collaboration with Ineos XC racers Tom Pidcock and Pauline Ferrand-Prévot, the Dogma XC Gen 2 and the lower Pinarello XC models were made available to the public in 2024, and both Pidcock and Prévot rode the bike to victory in the 2024 Paris Olympics. Pidcock, for whom the bike was tailored to his riding style, raced the bike in the 2023, 2024, and 2025 UCI XC World Championships, claiming the championship title in 2023. In 2025, he switched teams, leaving Ineos for team Q36.5, and rode the bike in accordance to his personal sponsorship from Pinarello despite the team's bike supplier contract with Scott Sports.

The Dogma XC was received favorably by the mountain biking community, with many publications praising its responsive handling and unparalleled stiffness under power, while criticizing the high price and distinctive Pinarello styling cues. The FS model of the bike utilized a split-pivot rear suspension layout with 90 to 100mm of rear wheel travel. The HT model, without rear suspension, had a patented asymmetric chainstay design, which the brand claims helped distribute pedaling power evenly into the rear axle. Both the FS and HT models of the bike were designed for 110mm of front travel. The Ineos Grenadiers XC team had bikes specced with a SR Suntour fork and rear shocks equipped with the TACT electronic suspension control system and Shimano XTR drivetrains and brakes, but the production models of the Dogma XC instead used Fox Factory suspension, Shimano XTR brakes and SRAM XX SL Transmission drivetrains. The lower Pinarello XC model used Fox Performance Elite suspension, Shimano Deore XT brakes and SRAM GX Transmission. As of 2025, the bike was still in production.

== Gallery ==
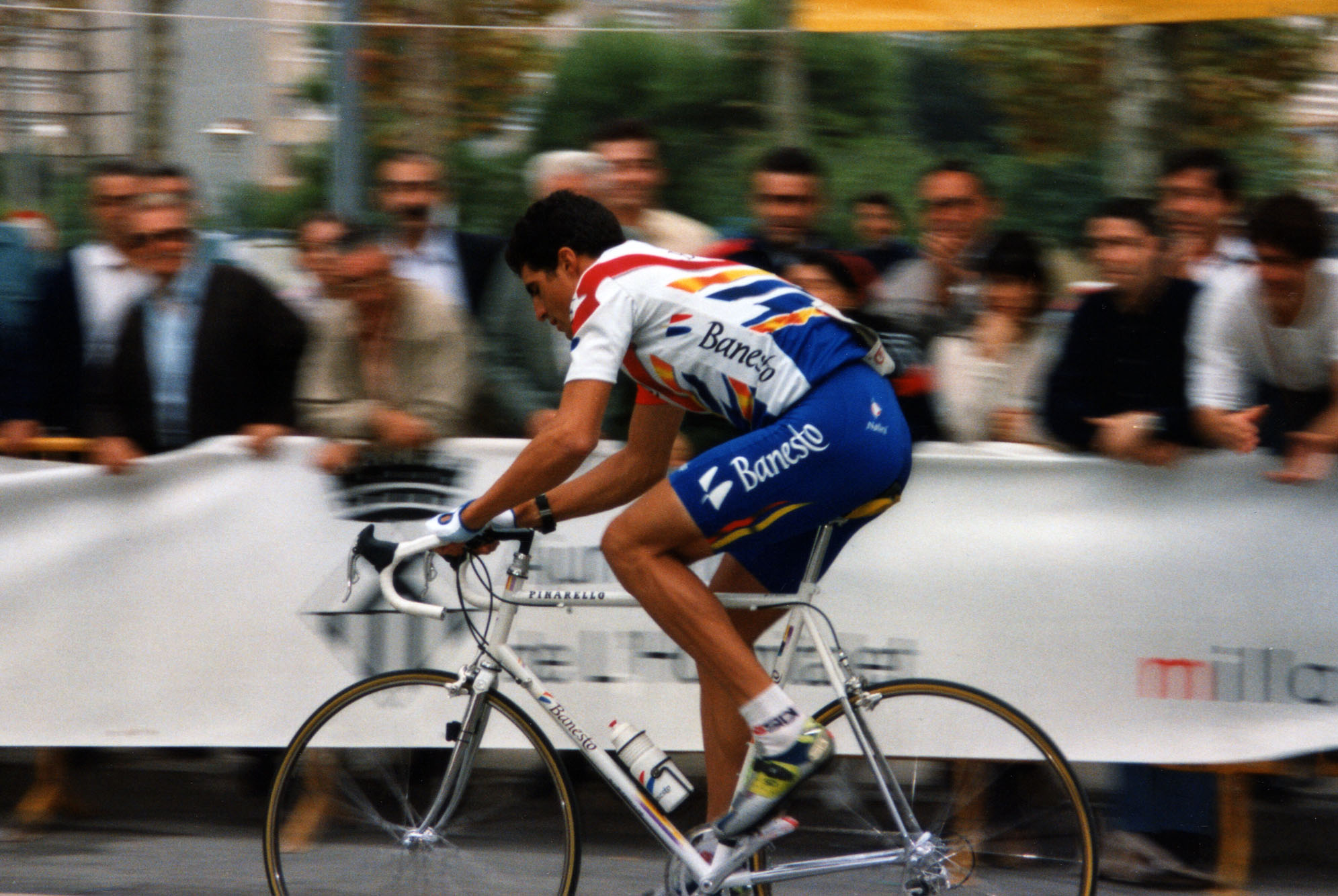
Miguel Indurain riding a Pinarello in 1996

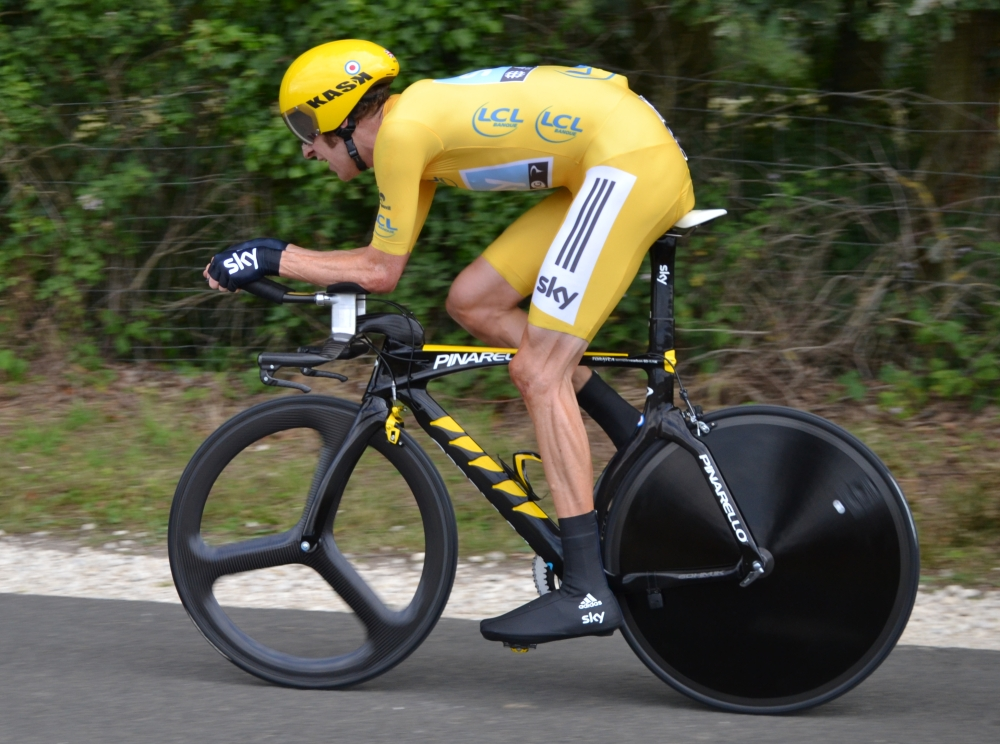
Bradley Wiggins on his special yellow edition Pinarello Graal at the 2012 Tour de France

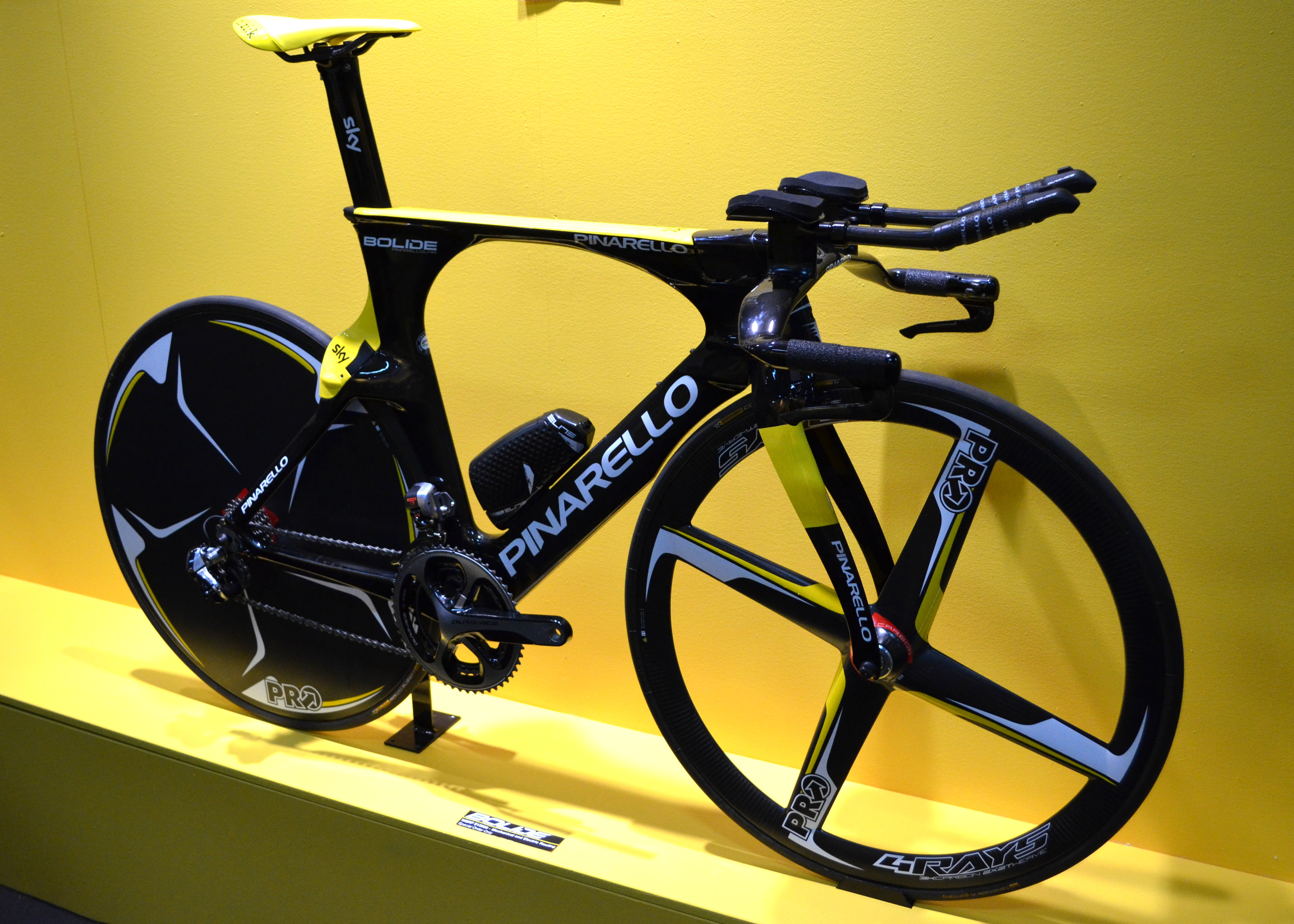
Pinarello Bolide ridden by Chris Froome at the 2013 Tour de France

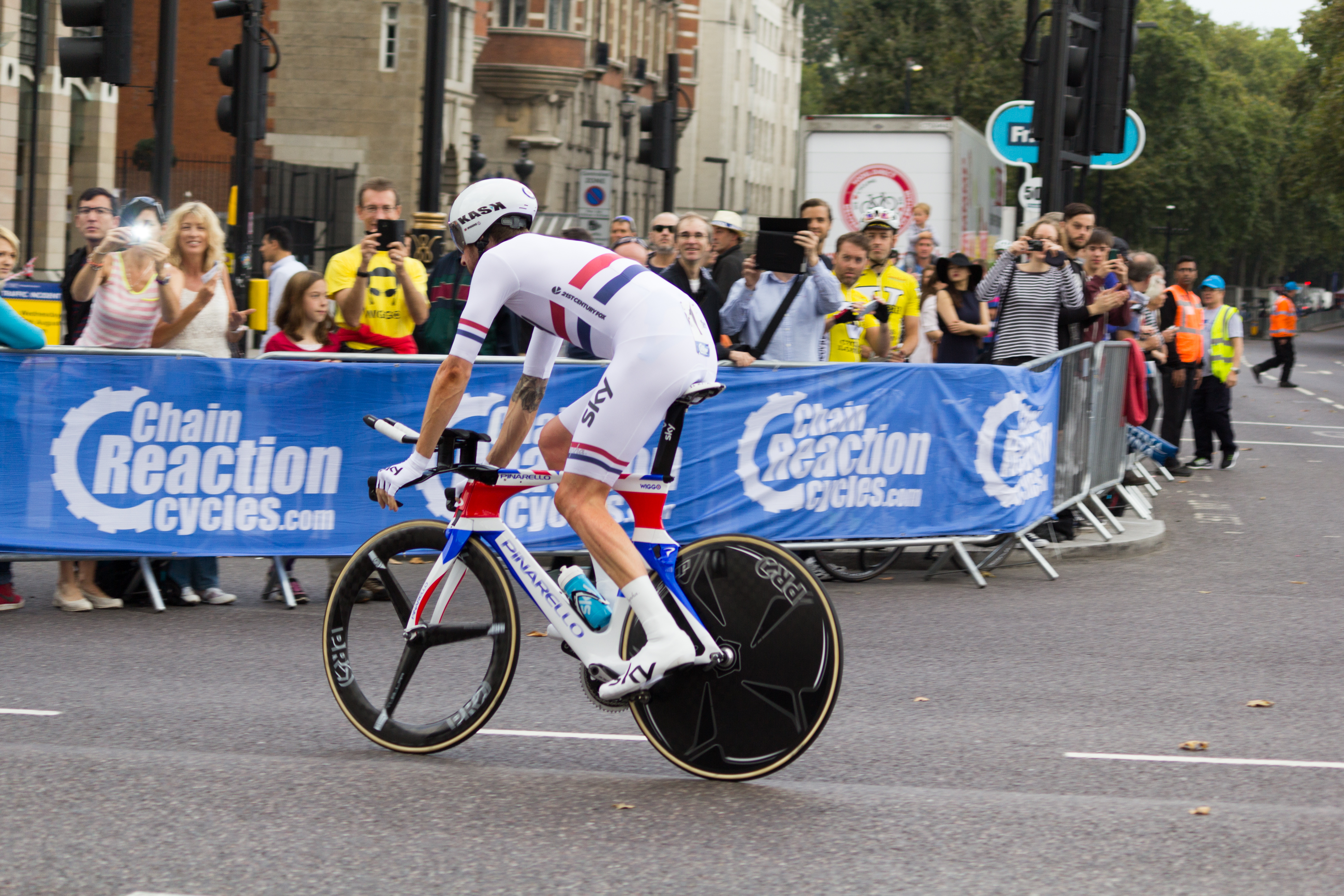
Bradley Wiggins on his British-national championship themed Bolide (prior to his 2014 World championships win)

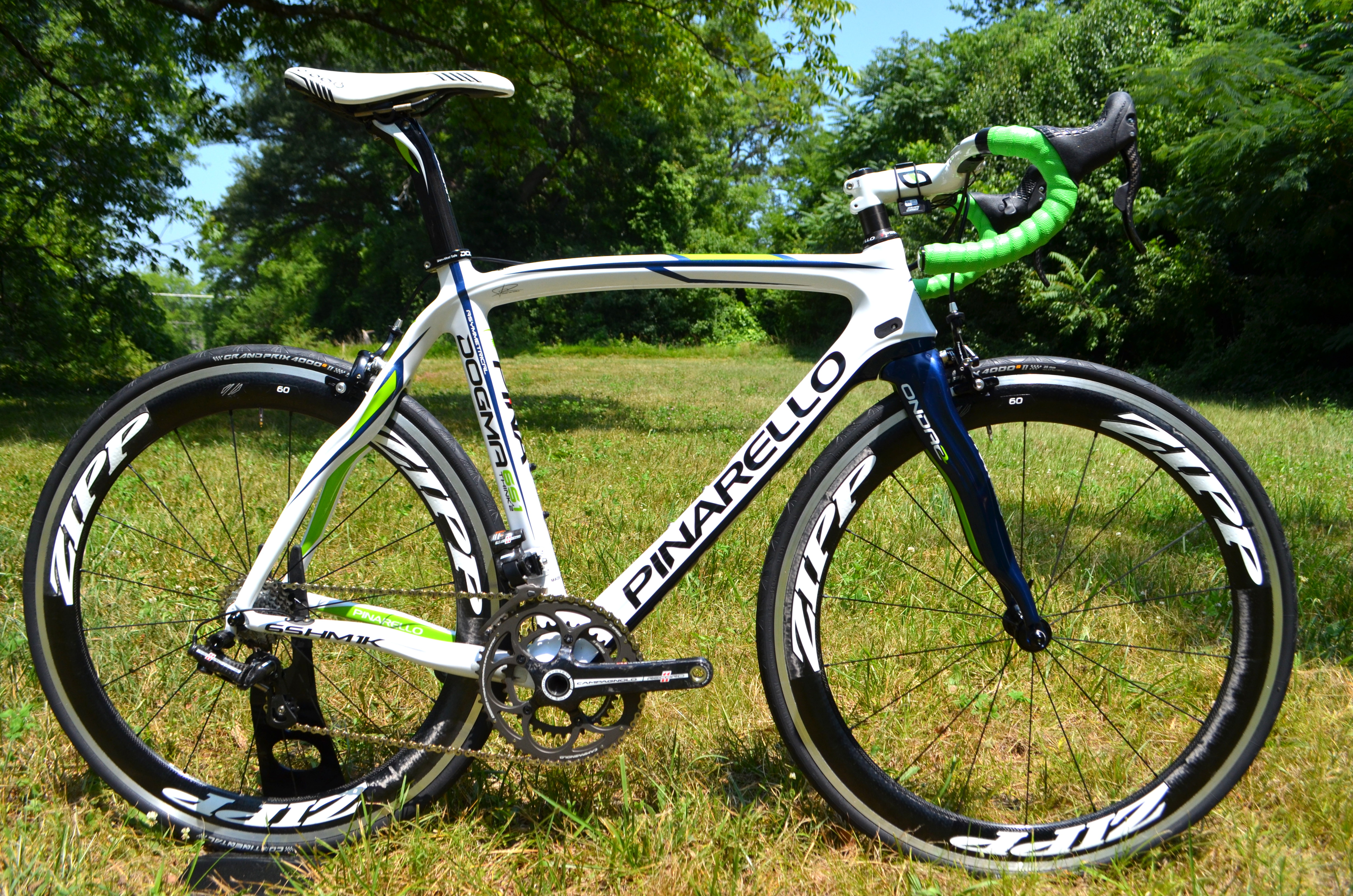
Dogma 65.1 equipped with Campagnolo Record EPS

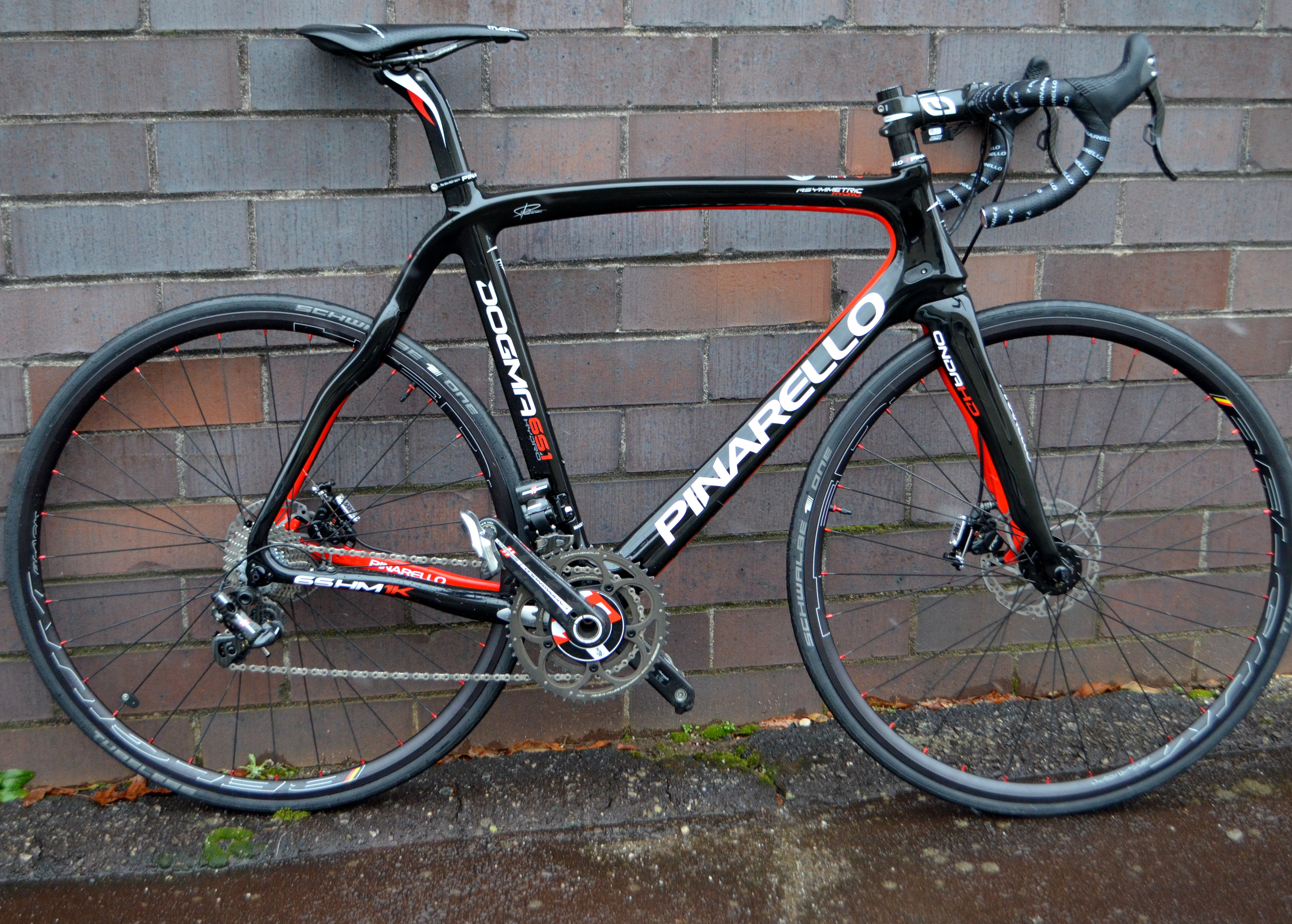
Dogma 65.1 equipped with disc brakes

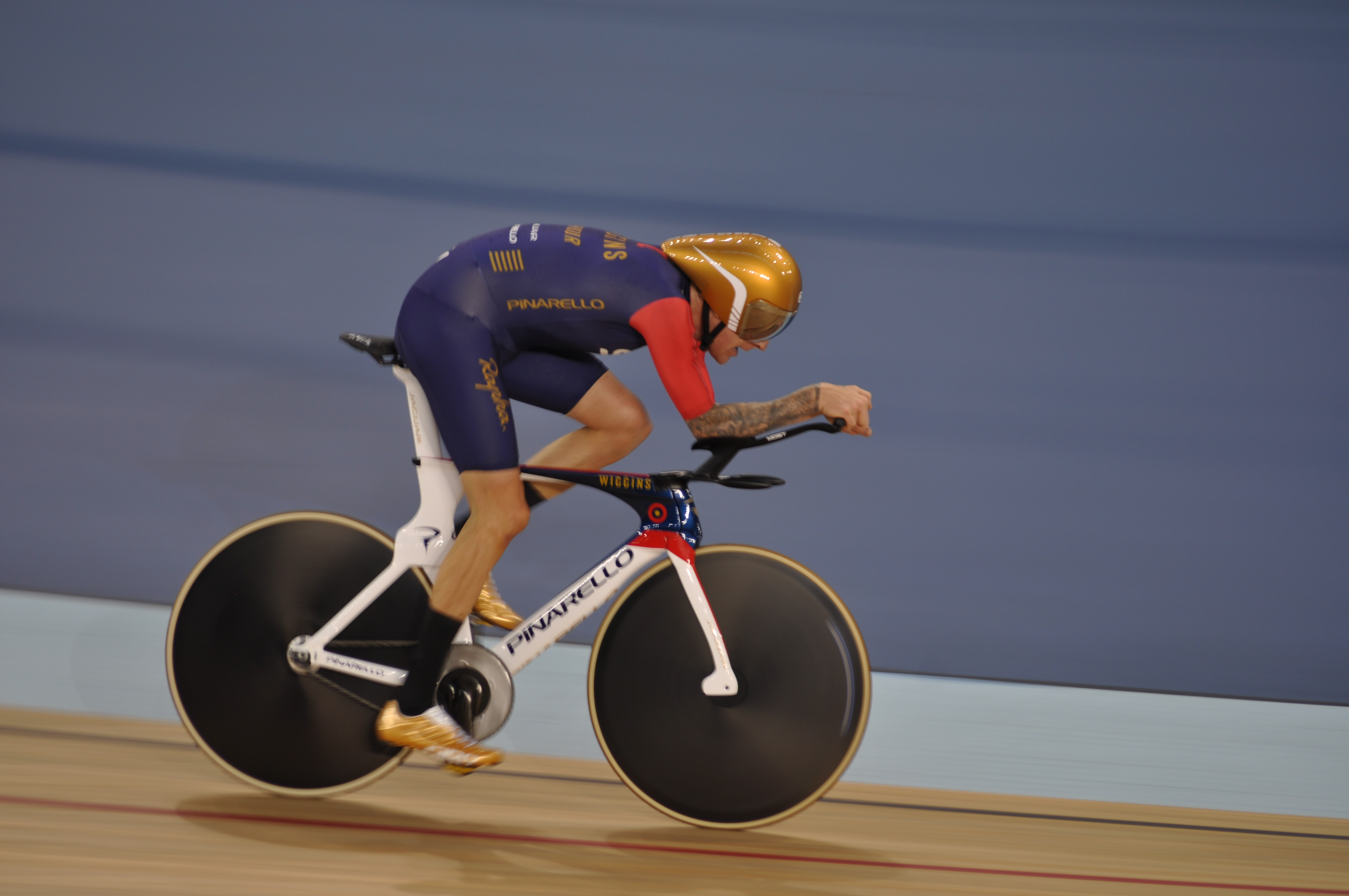
Bradley Wiggins on his way to breaking the Hour Record in 2015 on a modified Bolide

== Awards and Sponsorship ==
=== Awards ===
Cyclingnews.com "Best road bike" - Dogma F8, 2016
London Design Award - Dogma F8, 2014

=== Sponsorship ===
Pinarello has sponsored professional teams since 1960. Teams include Team Telekom, Banesto, Caisse d'Epargne, Del Tongo, Fassa Bortolo, Team Sky (now the INEOS Grenadiers), Movistar Team, British Cycling and British UCI Continental team Velosure-Giordana Racing Team.

=== Significant victories ===
1984
1st Olympic Road Race, Alexi Grewal
1988
1st Overall Tour de France, Pedro Delgado
1991
1st Overall Tour de France, Miguel Indurain
1st Overall Giro d'Italia, Franco Chioccioli
1st Mountains classification Vuelta a España, Luis Herrera
1992
1st Overall Giro d'Italia, Miguel Indurain

1st Intergiro Classification Giro d'Italia, Miguel Indurain

1st Overall Tour de France, Miguel Indurain
1993
1st Overall Giro d'Italia, Miguel Indurain
1st Overall Tour de France, Miguel Indurain
1994
1st Overall Tour de France, Miguel Indurain
1995
1st Overall Tour de France, Miguel Indurain
1st World Time Trial Championships, Miguel Indurain
1996
1st Overall Tour de France, Bjarne Riis

1st Points classification, Erik Zabel
1st Young rider classification, Jan Ullrich

1st Olympic Time Trial, Miguel Indurain
1997
1st Overall Tour de France, Jan Ullrich

1st Points classification, Erik Zabel
1st Young rider classification, Jan Ullrich

1st Mountains classification Vuelta a España, José María Jiménez
1st Milan–San Remo, Erik Zabel
1998
1st Points classification Tour de France, Erik Zabel
1st Young rider classification Tour de France, Jan Ullrich
1st Mountains classification Vuelta a España, José María Jiménez
1st Milan–San Remo, Erik Zabel
1st World Time Trial Championships, Abraham Olano
1999
1st Overall Vuelta a España, Jan Ullrich
1st Mountains classification Vuelta a España, José María Jiménez
1st Points classification Tour de France, Erik Zabel
1st World Time Trial Championships, Jan Ullrich
2000
1st Olympic Road Race, Jan Ullrich
1st Points classification Tour de France, Erik Zabel
1st Points classification Giro d'Italia, Dimitri Konyshev
1st Milan–San Remo, Erik Zabel
1st Giro di Lombardia, Raimondas Rumšas
2001
1st Points classification Tour de France, Erik Zabel
1st Points classification Vuelta a España, José María Jiménez
1st Mountains classification Vuelta a España, José María Jiménez
1st Milan–San Remo, Erik Zabel
1st World Time Trial Championships, Jan Ullrich
2002
1st Points classification Vuelta a España, Erik Zabel
1st Giro di Lombardia, Michele Bartoli
2003
1st Young rider classification Tour de France, Denis Menchov
1st Points classification Vuelta a España, Erik Zabel
1st Giro di Lombardia, Michele Bartoli
2004
1st Points classification Giro d'Italia, Alessandro Petacchi
1st Points classification Vuelta a España, Erik Zabel
2005
1st Points classification Vuelta a España, Alessandro Petacchi
1st Milan–San Remo, Alessandro Petacchi
2006
1st Overall Tour de France, Óscar Pereiro
2009
1st Overall Vuelta a España, Alejandro Valverde
2011
1st Overall Vuelta a España, Chris Froome
2012
1st Overall Tour de France, Bradley Wiggins
2013
1st Overall Tour de France, Chris Froome

1st Mountains classification, Nairo Quintana
1st Young rider classification, Nairo Quintana

1st World Road Race Championships, Rui Costa
2014
1st World Time Trial Championships, Bradley Wiggins
2015
1st Overall Tour de France, Chris Froome

1st Mountains classification, Chris Froome

1st World Time Trial Championships, Vasil Kiryienka
2016
1st Overall Tour de France, Chris Froome
1st Liège–Bastogne–Liège, Wout Poels
2017
1st Milan–San Remo, Michał Kwiatkowski
1st Overall Tour de France, Chris Froome
1st Overall Vuelta a España, Chris Froome

1st Points classification, Chris Froome
1st Combination classification, Chris Froome

2018
1st Overall Giro d'Italia, Chris Froome

1st Mountains classification, Chris Froome

1st Overall Tour de France, Geraint Thomas
2019
1st Overall Tour de France, Egan Bernal
2020
1st Overall Giro d'Italia Tao Geoghegan Hart
1st World Time Trial Championships, Filippo Ganna
1st Olympic Road Race, Richard Carapaz
1st Olympic Cross-country, Tom Pidcock
1st Olympic Team Pursuit, Filippo Ganna
2021
1st Overall Giro d'Italia, Egan Bernal
1st World Time Trial Championships, Filippo Ganna

== See also ==
- List of bicycle parts
- List of companies of Italy
