= Columbus (company) =

Italian steel tubing company

Columbus Tubi
- Type: Privately held company
- Industry: Metallic tubing and shaped parts manufacturing
- Founded: 1919; 107 years ago in Italy
- Founder: Angelo Luigi Colombo
- Headquarters: Settala, Italy
- Area served: Worldwide
- Key people: Antonio Colombo
- Parent: Gruppo SPA
- Website: columbustubi.com

Columbus Tubi is a manufacturer of steel tubing used in bicycle frames, located in Settala, in the Province of Milan. The company was founded in 1919 by A.L. Colombo and was taken over by Colombo's youngest son, Antonio, in 1977. It is now a division of Gruppo SPA, which also owns the bicycle manufacturer Cinelli.

Columbus tubing was the main competitor to TI Reynolds 531 in the bicycle tube set market with many of the big name Italian manufacturers of bicycles and framesets utilising their products. Famous name builders such as Bianchi, Centurion Bicycles (after 1981), De Rosa, Ciocc, Pinarello, and Colnago all specified the Columbus tubesets as part of their range.

Today the company produces a wide variety of butted tubes, and also produces pre-formed carbon fiber components.

== See also ==
- Reynolds Technology
- Tange International Co.
- List of bicycle parts
- List of companies of Italy
