= Ron Cooper (bicycle framebuilder) =

British bicycle framebuilder

- Cooper brazing a frame in 2006
- Born: 7 July 1931; Stockwell, London, England
- Died: 12 December 2012 (aged 80)

Ron Cooper (7 July 1931 – 12 December 2012) was a noted British "master" bicycle frame builder.

== Career ==
Cooper began building frames when he was 15, starting in 1947 when he began a full apprenticeship at A.S. Gillott Cycles, London, England. He learned his craft from frame builders in England, most notably Jim Collier and Bill Philbrook. He was a racing cyclist selected for the national team, the R.A.F., the Brighton-Glasgow and the London Centre in the 1952 Tour of Britain (Milk Race), before an accident forced him to retire from competition.

In 1967, Cooper left A.S. Gillott to build frames under his own name, and by 1970 set up a small shop in Honor Oak Park, South East London. Cooper then worked in Dartford, approx 18 km (11 miles) from his old shop in Honor Oak Park as sole fabricator, making bespoke steel frames using the traditional method of free hand brazing rather than jigs, in order to avoid stresses to be built into the frame, which calls for careful mitering and took about two days to make. Some reviews claim Cooper's frame builds provide more stability, neutrality of handling, and responsiveness.

== See also ==
- Roberts Cycles
- Witcomb Cycles
