= Richard Sachs =

American bicycle framebuilder

Richard Sachs (born February 14, 1953) is an American bicycle framebuilder based in Chester, Connecticut, since 1975. He builds road racing and cyclo-cross bicycles. His lug and fitting designs are employed by many other framebuilders. Richard Sachs designs and distributes racing cycle attire, accessories and accoutrements.

== Richard Sachs Cycles ==
On graduating from the Peddie School in 1971, Sachs spent close to a year in England as an apprentice with Witcomb Cycles. He returned to the United States and in 1975 began building frames under his own name. He spent over 30 years building lugged steel bicycle frames and forks in Chester, Connecticut. He builds 80 to 90 a year.

He has since moved to Warwick, Massachusetts to continue his craft.
