= Tange International Co. =

Tange International Co. is a major Japanese manufacturer of steel tubing for bicycle frames, established before 1920.

They are a rival to the British-based tubing manufacturer Reynolds. Where the de facto standard of bicycle tubing from European bike boom bikes is Reynolds steel, the Japanese de facto standard is Tange. They were also found throughout the 1980s on many higher-quality far eastern-produced bikes because of the higher cost of Reynolds steel.

Tange moved its production to Taiwan.

== History ==
Tange was founded in Sakai, Osaka in 1920 by Yasujiro Tange.

Tange first produced forks and frame tubes of Crome Molydaen. In 1950 Tange moved its facilities to Sakai City, Osaka. In 1958 the company received JIS (Japanese Industrial Standard) certification.

From 1974 Tange started the production of frame components for seat stays, chain stays, dropouts, lugs and headsets. During the period for CrMo bikes, for road racing, and moreover BMX and MTB, Tange was used by the biggest bikes brands, as well as bespoke frame builders.

Tange still produces high-quality frame tubing to compete with companies like Reynolds and Columbus; however, they only produce chromoly steel nowadays instead of mangaloy steel. Their current tubing range consists of four tiers: Tange Chromo, Infinity, Prestige and Ultimate.

Soma have been using Tange Prestige tubes since 2007, and the first non-Italian tube to be used by Pinarello was Tange Prestige. The British bicycle manufacturer Charge also uses a variety of Tange tubing for their steel frames.

In 2015 Tange launched its own bike brand: YASUJIRO.

== Products ==
The representative model of the Tange company is Prestige, which appeared in 1984. It is according to frame builder lightweight, has a high tensile strength, and unique spring feeling. In addition, the Champion series NO1 and NO2 were also standard, and were preferred for standard road bikes and touring bikes. The ultra-lightweight pipe Ultimate and slim Slender have been added.

== See also ==
- Columbus (company)
- Reynolds Technology
