= Cinelli =

Italian bicycle manufacturer

Coordinates: 45.430364°N 9.3815657°E

- Type: Private
- Industry: Bicycle industry
- Founded: 1948; 78 years ago
- Founder: Cino Cinelli
- Headquarters: Milan, Italy
- Area served: Worldwide
- Products: Bicycles, E-bike, Bicycle frame and related components
- Website: cinelli.it

Cinelli (Italian pronunciation: [tʃiˈnɛlli]) is an Italian bicycle manufacturing company based in Milan, producing mostly road bicycles and components; production is estimated to consist of 80 per cent components and 20 per cent bicycles.

The iconic Cinelli Supercorsa is the oldest bicycle model still in production in the world. Athletes have won 28 Olympic and world track gold medals on Cinelli Laser models.

== History ==
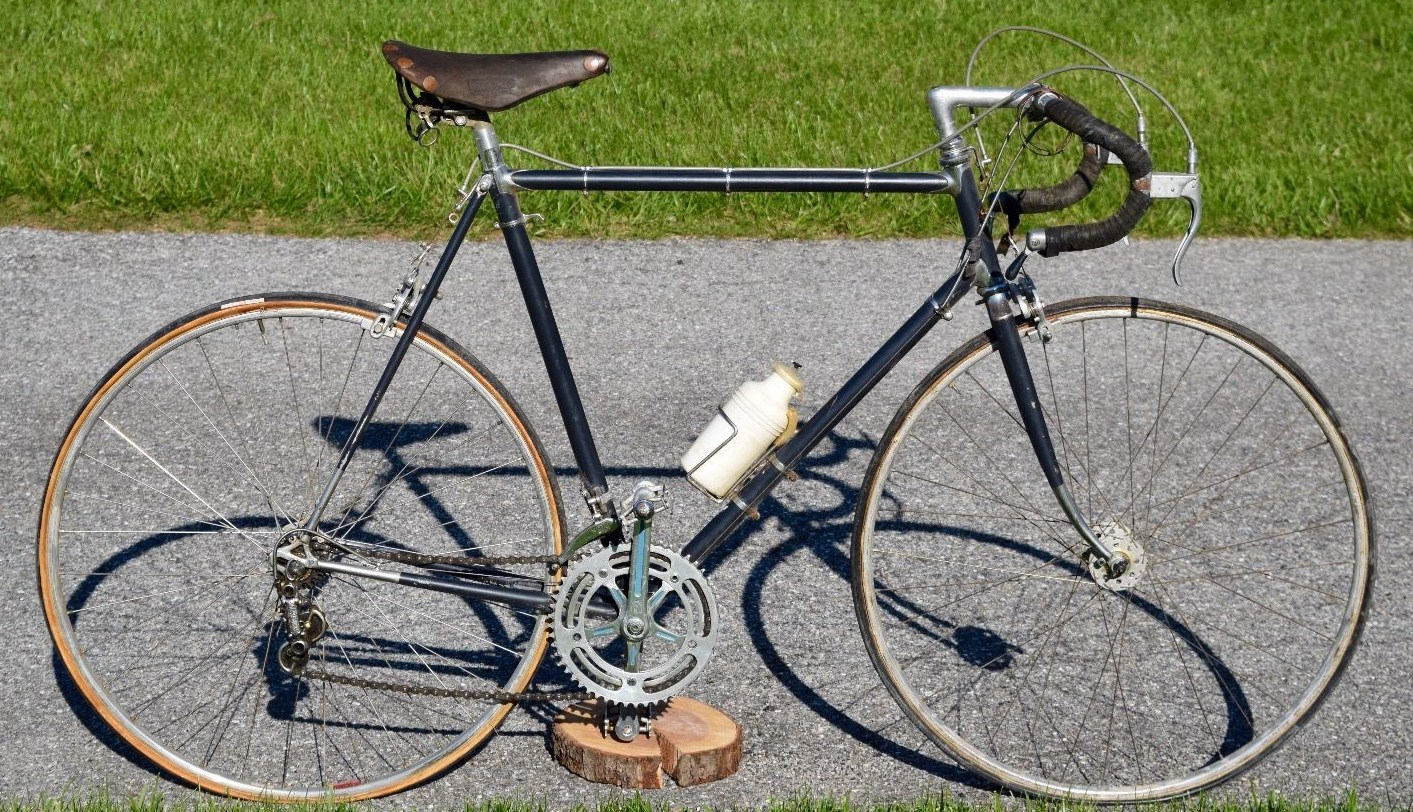
Cinelli SC 1965

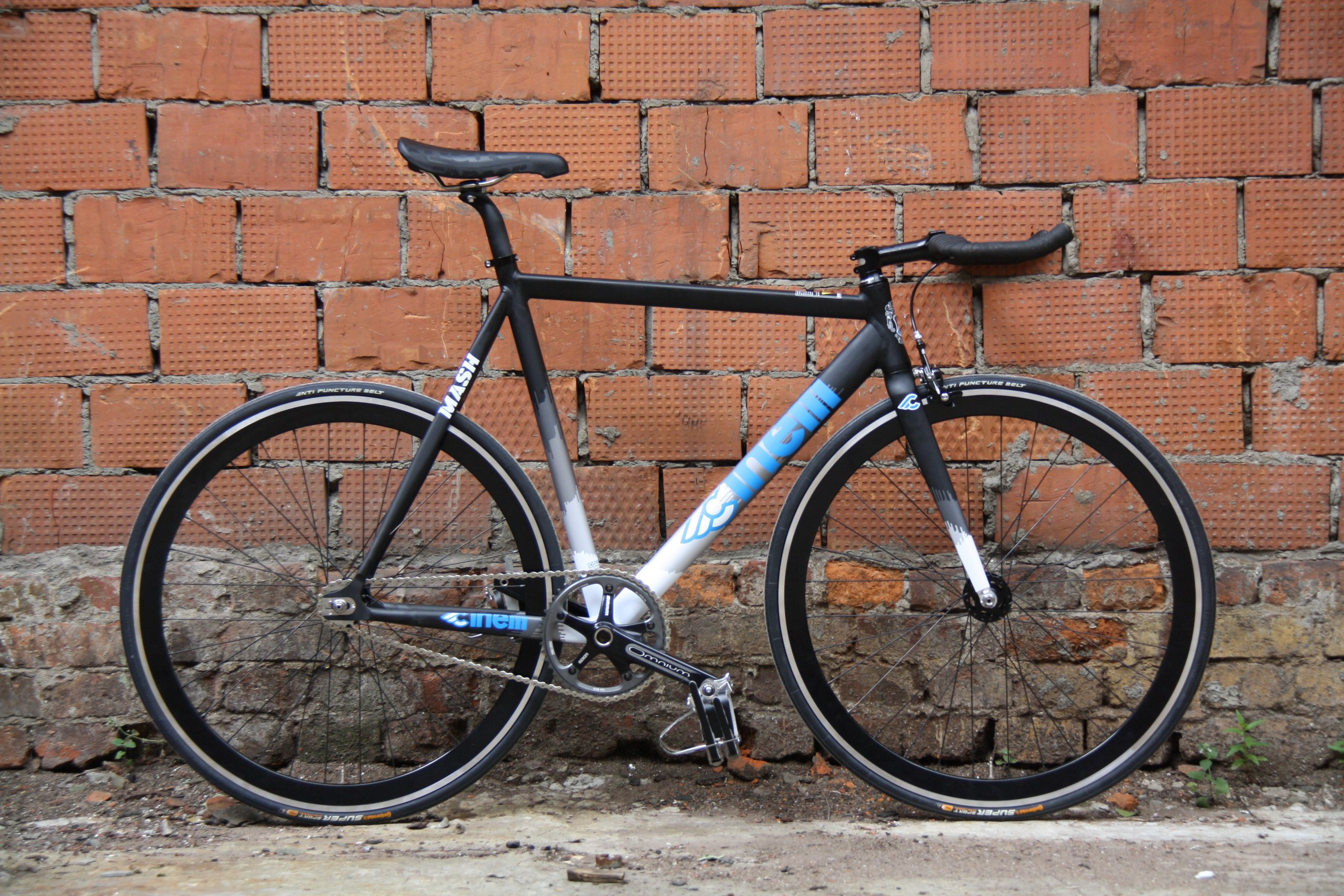
Cinelli Mash Histogram 2012

Cinelli was founded in 1948 by Cino Cinelli (born Montespertoli, 9 February 1916, died 20 April 2001), a former professional road racer and president of the Italian Cyclists' Association. He was a professional racer from 1937 to 1944, winning Milan–San Remo in 1943, the Giro di Lombardia in 1938, and the Tour of the Apennines in 1937. He started a company under his name in 1948.

Cinelli was the seventh of 10 children, the son of a small landowner near Florence. He became interested in bicycle technology after mechanical failures in races. Failure to interest manufacturers with his ideas in 1946 led him to start his own company. His brother Giotto was making steel stems and bars in Florence and Cinelli moved the business to Milan, centre of the Italian cycling industry. He made stems, bars and frames but depended on wholesaling for other companies. By his retirement, Cinelli's own goods were half the business. Stems and bars were 80 per cent of Cinelli's own sales.

Cinelli moved to alloy production in 1963, later than other manufacturers because he was concerned about strength. Annual production of alloy stems and bars rose from 5,000 in the 1950s, to 7,500 in the early 1960s. By 1978 the figure was 150,000. He made no more than 700 frames a year. In 1974, he designed an aerodynamic bike on which Ole Ritter broke his own hour record. The staple product was the Speciale Corsa road model made from 1947. The Speciale Corsa also became known as the "Super Corsa" after a supplier sent decals that erroneously said "Super Corsa" instead of "Speciale Corsa."

Cinelli recently teamed up with San Francisco-based MashSF to create the popular "Cinelli MASH" frames, which are widely used in the fixed-gear culture.

== Trade mark ==
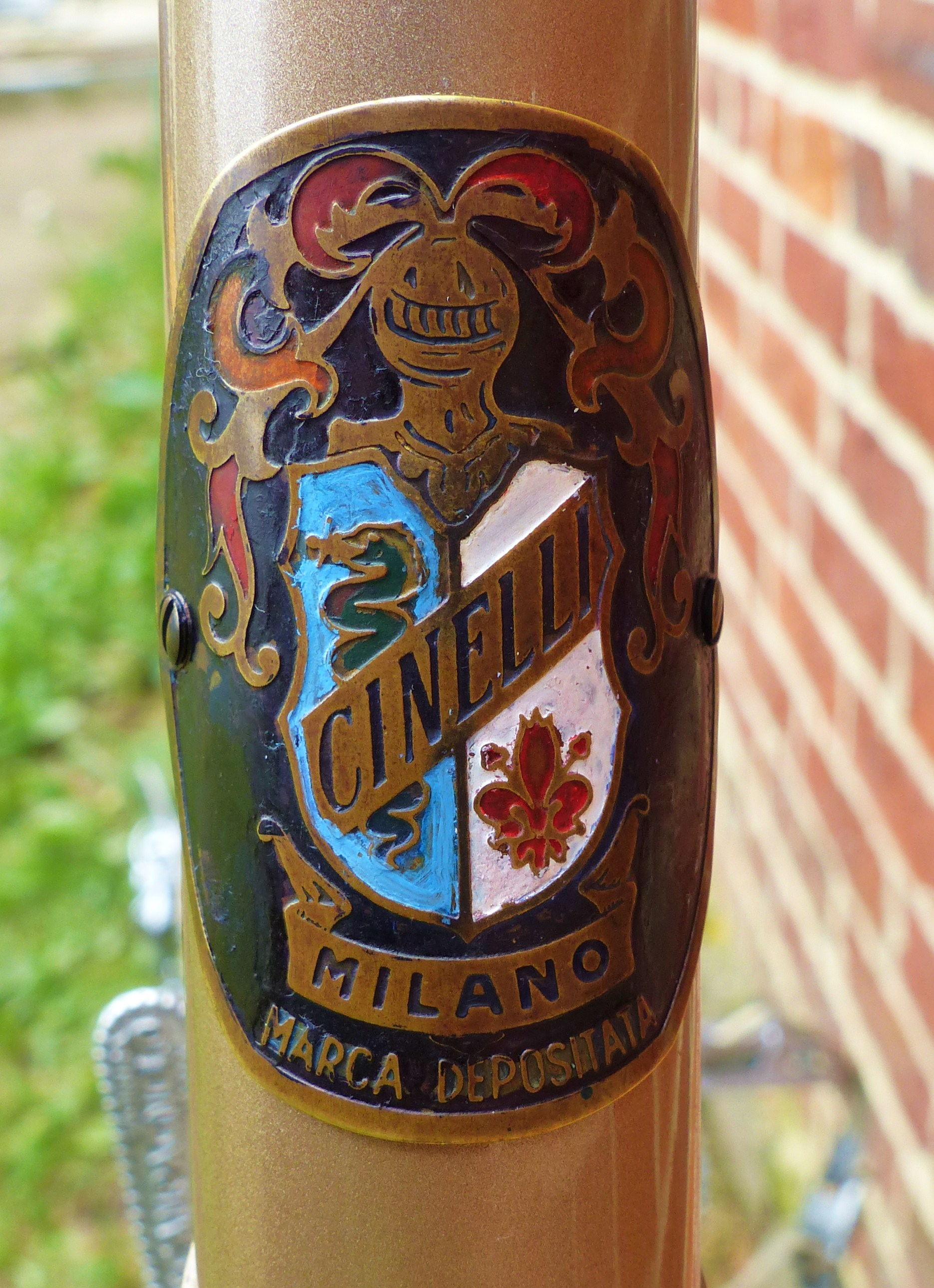
Cinelli's historic head badge (1947–1979)

The Cinelli (MILANO) head badge was originally cloisonne (fired glass on brass) and 55mm tall. Shortly thereafter (c.1953) it was hand-painted with enamel and 56mm tall. In approximately 1958 it was reduced in height to 51mm. In 1978, it became a decal. The design featured a knight's helmet, inspired by a family heirloom, with a red lily - symbol of Florence - and a green serpent, symbol of Milan.

== Company ownership ==
The presidency of the company passed to Antonio Colombo, owner of Columbus tubing, in 1978. In 1997 Cinelli became a division of Gruppo S.R.L. In August 2021 US company Asobi Ventures bought Cinelli's parent company Gruppo S.R.L. for a non-public price.

== Innovative products ==
- Binda toe-straps (acquired by Cinelli - 1958)
- Integral sloping fork crown (1950?)
- Unicanitor saddle (1962 - from acquisition of Unica) - The first plastic-bodied saddle
- Bivalent Hub (1960?) - After removal the freewheel stays attached to the frame; front and rear wheels are therefore interchangeable
- M71 Pedal (1971) - The first quick-release pedal (ref. 1971 Cinelli Catalog)
- Cinelli Model 1R stem with hidden clamp bolt (1971, ref Catalog M71, above)
- Laser (1980) - Track pursuit and time trial model which pioneered TiG welding in bicycle frames
- Rampichino (1985) - The first mountain bike in Italy
- Cork Ribbon (1987) - Handlebar tape

== See also ==
- List of bicycle parts
- List of Italian companies
