= Reynolds 531 =

Registered brand name of lightweight steel alloy frame tubing

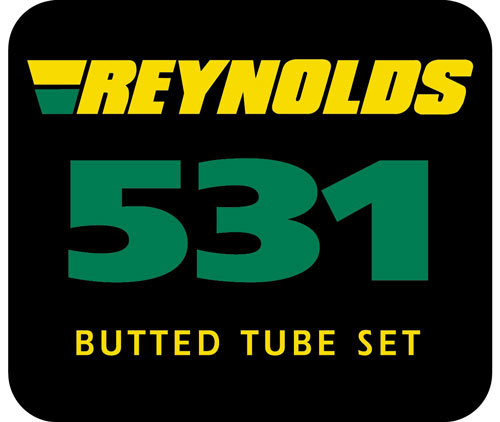
- Reynolds 531 brand logo
- Product type: alloy steel tubing
- Current owner: Reynolds Technology
- Country: England
- Introduced: 1935
- Related brands: Reynolds 520; Reynolds 525
- Website: Reynolds 531

Reynolds 531 (pronounced 'five-three-one') is a brand name, registered to Reynolds Technology of Birmingham in the United Kingdom, for a manganese–molybdenum, medium-carbon steel tubing that was used in many quality applications, including race car chassis, aircraft components and, most famously, bicycle frame tubing. It is one of a number of tubing types developed by Reynolds.

Reynolds 531 "was the standard of excellence for many decades" among bicycle frame-building materials. And because of the availability of a wide range of butting, diameters and thicknesses of tubes, along with different stays and fork blades, it became the tubing of choice for most frame builders.

== Details ==
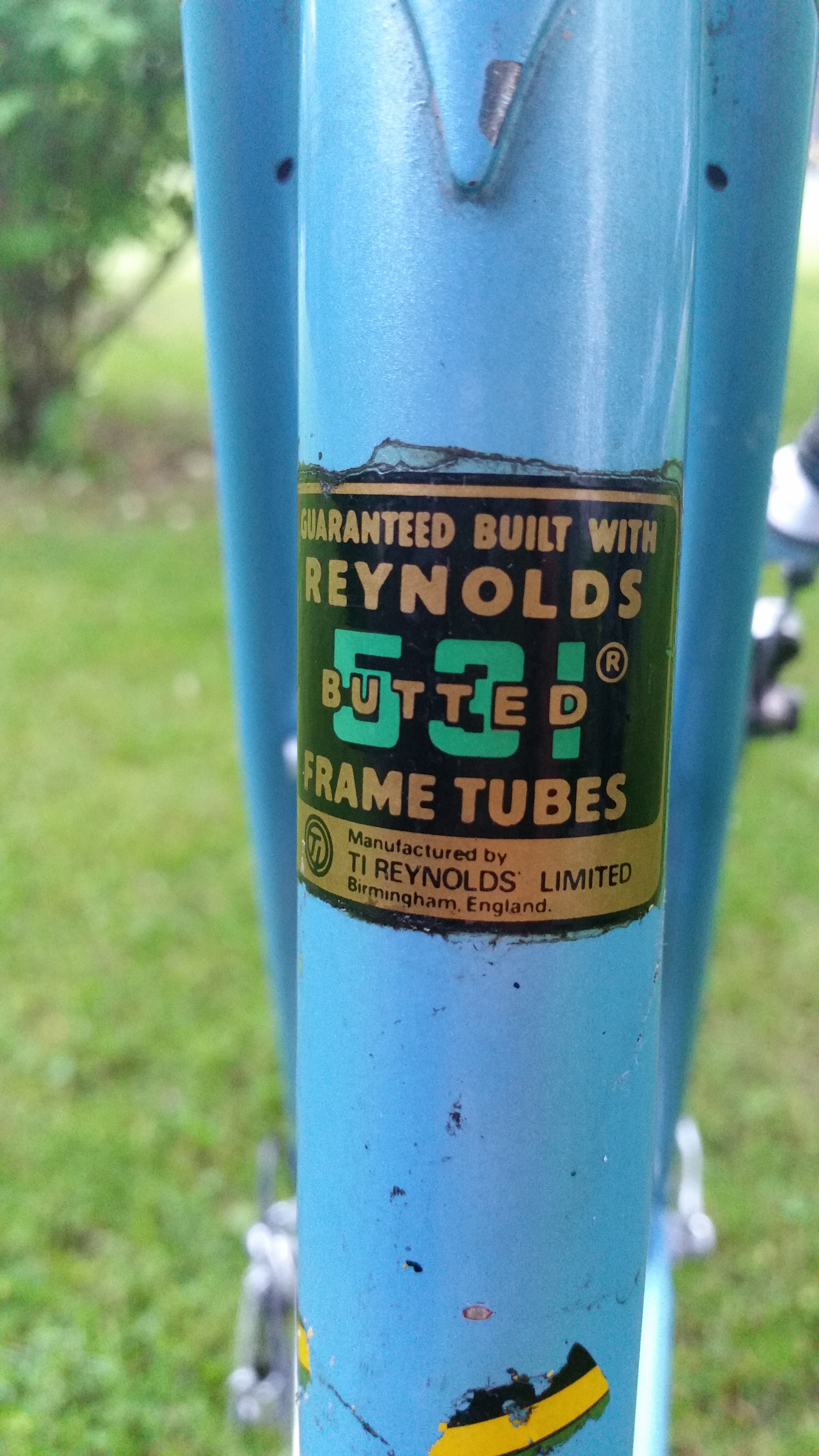
Reynolds 531 bicycle frame tubes.

Introduced in 1935 and for many years at the forefront of alloy steel tubing technology, 531 cycle tubing has been superseded by more complex alloys and heat-treatment/cold-forming cycles as Reynolds continues to compete with other manufacturers of steel for the bicycle industry.

531 tubing became the tubing-of-choice for most framebuilders at least partly because of the huge range of butting, diameters and thicknesses of tubes along with different stays and fork blades available – helped by the willingness of Reynolds to make special tubes for certain manufacturers. Reynolds also made up complete 'sets' of tubing for different cycling applications – for example 531c (Competition), 531st (Super Tourist), 531ATB (All Terrain Bike) and so on. This flexibility made 531 still competitive even after the introduction of more advanced alloys. The widespread use of TIG and MIG welding in cycle manufacture became a problem as 531 reacted poorly to the higher temperatures produced and 531 has been gradually phased out as a result.

The most common like-for-like replacements for 531 are Reynolds 520 and 525 – a chrome-molybdenum tubing with very similar characteristics, but in addition to brazing, can also be welded. The 520 and 525 tubing are essentially the same thing. The difference being that 525 is made at Reynolds headquarters in Birmingham, England while 520 is made to the same specifications in Taiwan, saving transportation costs when supplying Taiwanese frame builders.

The approximate alloying composition of 531 tubing is 1.5% Mn, 0.25% Mo, 0.35% C, and is similar to the old British BS970 En 16/18 steel (EN 16 is similar to grade BS970 605M36). Its mechanical properties and response to heat treatment are broadly similar to the AISI 4130 standard alloy steel, also used for bicycle frames, motorcycles, as well as aviation and motor-sport. This material was used to form the front subframes on the Jaguar E-Type of the 1960s.

Reynolds 531 is now only available by special order. The nearest available stock material is BS4t45 to Bs5T100 in accordance with BS6S100 conditions. (T45) Reynolds has superseded this tube set with a number of innovations such as Reynolds 753 and the more current 853. Reynolds also produces stainless steel tube sets for bicycle frame building – these are 925 and 953.
