= Witcomb Cycles =

- Company type: Private
- Industry: Framebuilding and cyclesports equipment
- Founded: 1949
- Headquarters: Unknown, formerly at 25 Tanners Hill, Deptford, London, United Kingdom
- Key people: Ernie Witcomb, co-founder – Lily Witcomb, co-founder (both retired); Barrie Witcomb, director and framebuilder – Nicholas Young
- Products: Bicycles, cycling accessories and cyclewear

Witcomb Cycles, formerly known as Witcomb Lightweight Cycles, is the trading name of the Witcomb Trading Company. It was a British company based in Deptford, South London, specialising in custom handmade steel bicycle frames. The company was founded in 1949, by Ernie Witcomb and his wife Lily. The London shop closed in May 2009.

== History ==
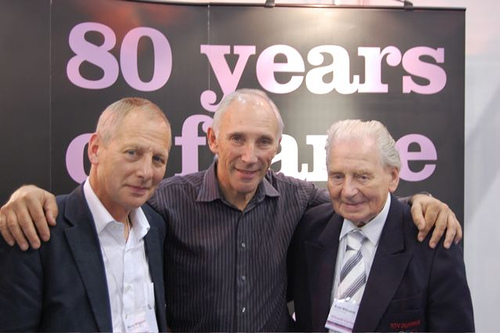
Left to right: Barrie Witcomb, Phil Liggett and Ernie Witcomb on the Witcomb Cycles stand at the London Cycle Show – 11 October 2007

Ernie Witcomb's father, Tom, a steel worker in local dockyards, started to build frames in 1928 in his east London cellar. In 1951, Ernie bought E.A. Boult, where he had been working since before World War II and, by 1952, started trading as Witcomb Lightweight Cycles with Wally Green as frame builder.

Barrie Witcomb, Ernie Witcomb's son, started his apprenticeship as a frame builder in 1958 at the age of 15, under Malcolm Barker, a former builder at J.R.J. Cycles in Leeds.

In 1959, Witcomb Cycles bought Rotrax Cycles building. In 1961, Witcomb co-founded the Lightweight Cycle Association, one of cycling's first trade-focused organisations. In the 1960s, Witcomb Trading also made frames for Sid Mottram, Rotrax, Velosport and others. More recently they have made frames for the fashion brand Carhartt and Reynolds steel.

Richard Sachs, Peter Weigle, Chris Chance and Ben Serotta, four American frame builders, trained at Witcomb Cycles in the early 1970s, along with the British wheel builder, Harry Rowland.

By the 1980s, the fashion for mountain bikes put a strain on the business, which went into decline. In 1998, Ernie Witcomb retired. The company seems to have been dormant since 2009.

== Location ==
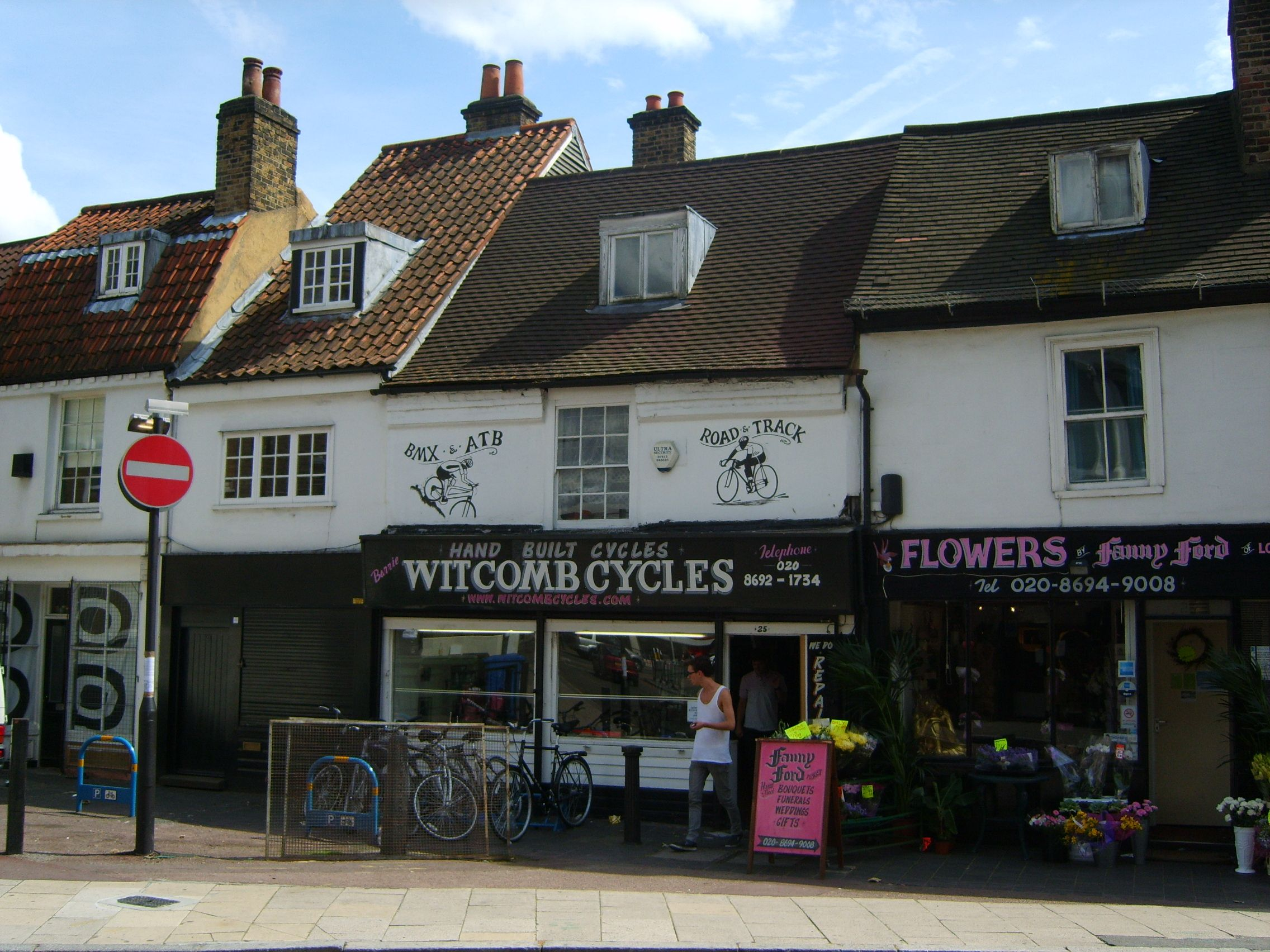
Witcomb's shop in Tanners Hill

From its beginning, until 2009, the company's headquarters was located in London, starting in Woolwich, then later moving to Tanners Hill in Deptford. After moves from one building to another, the workshop stayed at 25 Tanners Hill, a late 17th-century Grade II listed building for many years. During the late 1960s until the early 1980s, the company also operated a factory in Llanelli, Carmarthenshire, Wales. The London site was closed in May 2009, and the business announced an intention to move production to Wales. This does not appear to have materialised.

== Witcomb USA ==
In 1971, the company represented the UK at a British Fair in New York City. The next year, Witcomb, while exhibiting in San Francisco, received Princess Alexandra and her husband, Sir Angus Ogilvy. This marked a short-lived foray on the US market. Witcomb USA was founded in 1972 in East Haddam, Connecticut by Richard Sachs and Peter Weigle. However, problems with suppliers meant the company could not fulfill demand, and the venture was dismantled after 8 years.

== Racing Team ==
In the 1960s, Witcomb Cycles sponsored the London Coureurs and the Hadrian CC Riders, then the Witcomb Metro CRC, and the Witcomb Vulcan CRC. Witcomb organised races including Dover-London. At this time Barrie Witcomb started racing as an independent (semi-professional).

== See also ==
- List of bicycle manufacturing companies
