= Reynolds Technology =

Steel tubing manufacturer, known for bicycle frames

Reynolds Technology Ltd.
- Reynolds Technology logo
- Formerly: The Reynolds Tube Company; The Patent Butted Tube Co., Ltd.; Reynolds Tube Co., Ltd; TI Reynolds 531 Ltd.; Reynolds Cycle Technology Ltd.
- Company type: Private
- Industry: Metallic tubing and shaped parts manufacturing
- Founded: 1898; 128 years ago in Birmingham, England
- Founder: John Reynolds
- Headquarters: Birmingham, England
- Products: Reynolds 531; Reynolds 525; Reynolds 631; Reynolds 725; Reynolds 753; Reynolds 853; Reynolds 921; Reynolds 953
- Website: reynoldstechnology.biz

Reynolds Technology is a manufacturer of tubing for bicycle frames and other bicycle components based in Birmingham, England established in 1898.

== History ==
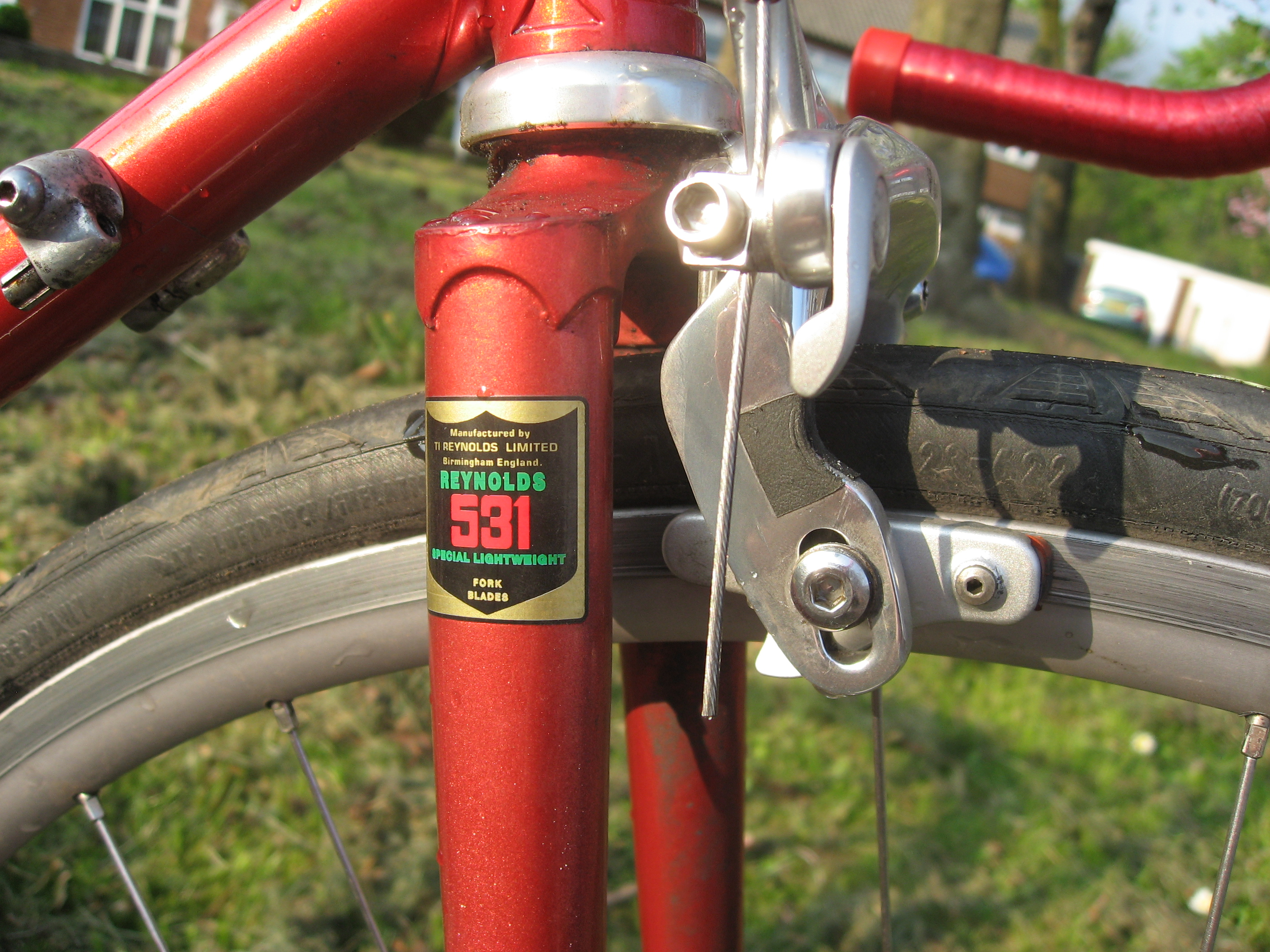
The Reynolds 531SL fork blade decal showing on a set of 531SL fork blades.

The Reynolds Tube Company was founded in 1898 by John Reynolds in Birmingham, England, but traces its origins back to 1841 when John Reynolds set up a company manufacturing nails. In 1897, the company patented the process for making butted tubes, which are thicker at the ends than in the middle, this allowed frame builders to create frames that were both strong and lightweight. Reynolds introduced the double-butted tube-set 531 in 1934.

The Patent Butted Tube Co., Ltd., the predecessor of the present company, was spun off from John Reynolds' original company in 1898. In 1923 the Patent Butted Tube Co., Ltd changed its name to Reynolds Tube Co., Ltd. and retained this name up until 1928 when it was acquired by Tube Investments, Ltd and became TI Reynolds 531 Ltd.

In 1996 Coyote Sports Inc., a privately held company based in Boulder, Colorado acquired TI Reynolds 531 Ltd. resulting in a name change to Reynolds Cycle Technology Ltd. In 2006 the company underwent another name change to Reynolds Technology Ltd., reflecting the increasing revenues from diversification into "new" sectors for tubing outside the cycle industry.

When Coyote Sports entered Chapter 11 reorganization, a management buy-out resulted in the company returning to its base in the UK.

=== Cycle tubing development ===
A Reynolds 531 special lightweight race frame.

Reynolds has over the years developed a number of steel alloys, most notably Reynolds 531, which has a high strength and can be made into strong, but lightweight tubes for bicycle frames. Before the introduction of more exotic materials such as aluminium, titanium or composites, Reynolds was considered the dominant maker of high end materials for bicycle frames, with 27 winners of the Tour de France winning the race riding on Reynolds tubing. The Raleigh Bicycle Company of Nottingham, England was a big customer for Reynolds 531 tubing used in their racing cycle range.

Reynolds 531 has now been largely replaced in new frames by still-better steels. The latest, for race or sports frames, is Reynolds 953. Reynolds worked closely with Carpenter Speciality Alloys to develop 953. It started reaching frame builders in 2005. 953 is based on a specially developed maraging steel stainless steel alloy that can achieve a tensile strength in excess of 2000 MPa (853 is around 1400 MPa), giving a good strength-to-weight ratio. Because of the high strength of the steel, extremely thin tube walls (down to 0.3 mm) can be used, thus reducing the weight. Reynolds 953 is no longer being sold due to supply chain issues.

=== Composites ===
A U.S. division called Reynolds Composites was created to manufacture composite components.

== Tubing types ==
=== Steel ===
- SMS - Plain gauge (0.8mm) drawn tubeset in high tensile steel. Replaced 531 plain gauge in 1980, replaced by 453.
- 453 - cromoly steel alloy. Reynolds produced only the 3 main tubes in this alloy and they were single butted, replaced by 500 series.
- 500 - A chromium-molybdenum (CrMo) steel, seamed, plain gauge tubeset of 3 main triangle tubes
  - 500ATB - Mountain, All terrain, Off-road
  - 500 Magnum - Same use as ATB
- 501 - Reynolds 501 was a chromium-molybdenum (CrMo) steel, seamed, butted 3-tubes tubeset that made its debut about 1983 and was available in two different thicknesses.
  - 501ATB - Mountain, All terrain, Off-road
  - 501 Magnum - Same use as ATB
  - 501SB - Single Butted
  - 501SL - Special lightweight (SL) tubeset
- K2 - Reynolds K2 was a chromium-molybdenum (CrMo) steel similar to 501, seamed, butted tubeset, with eight laterally aligned ribs on the butt section, designed and produced exclusively for Raleigh between about 1993 and 1995
- Optima - A chromium-molybdenum (CrMo) steel, seamed, butted tubeset designed and produced exclusively for Raleigh from 1995. Similar to 501 but tweaked for tig welding.
- 525 - Cold worked AISI-4130 (CrMo). Yield Strength / Ultimate Tensile Strength (YS/UTS): 700/900 MPa, density 7.78 g/cm^{3} 8 tube set
  - 525-Triathlon - almost identical to 525, with the only differences being seat stays are 0.1mm thinner, and chainstays are 0.1mm thicker, than standard 525
  - 520 - is the same as 525, made under license in Taiwan, to the same specs and qc standards as for 525. For proximity to manufacturing in South-East Asia.
- 531 - Manganese/Molybdenum. YS/UTS: 695/803 MPa (45-52 Tsi, 100-130 ksi) (number quoted are for after (lower) and before (higher) brazing), density 7.85 g/cm^{3} Starting in about 1980 tubesets of different gauges were named as follows.
  - 531ATB - Designed for Mountain, All terrain, Off-road
  - 531Competition/531C - Competition Racing tubeset. Road racing, track, time trial and cyclo-cross. main tubes were 8/5/8 double butted
  - 531CS - Club Sport. Double butted 531 main tubes, 501 forks and stays.
  - 531Magnum - Oversize, heavy gauge tubeset for use in ATB's.
  - 531OS - Oversize tubeset
  - 531Professional - Superseded 531SL, thinner and 150g lighter than 531Competition.
  - 531SL - Special lightweight (SL) tubeset, comprising 531 main tubes drawn thinner than standard 531. Later named 531Pro.
  - 531 Speed Stream - 531SL Oval shaped aerodynamic tube. 50g heavier than 531C but 100g lighter than 531ST.
  - 531ST - Special Touring tubeset
  - 531 Super Tourist - Superseded ST.
  - 531DS Designer select tubing. Alternative 531 tubes with differing gauges and profiles were available to the specialist builder.
- 631 - Seamless air-hardened. UTS: 800-900 MPa, density 7.78 g/cm^{3}
  - 631OS - Oversize tubeset
- 653 - Was a mixed tubeset with a non-heat treated 753 main triangle. Stays used 753r and fork blades were borrowed from the 531c tube set.
- 708 - 708 was a tube set in Reynolds' range in the 1990s. It has main tubes with special section. These were not butted, but had 8 flats running along the length of the tube. The rear stays would be 753.
- 725 - Heat-Treated 525; AISI4130 (CrMo), with strength placing it just above 921 and below 931; UTS: 1080-1280 MPa, density 7.78 g/cm^{3}
  - 725os - Oversize version of the 725 tubeset
- 731OS - Oversize tubeset introduced in 1992 double butted oversized tubes with laterally aligned stiffening ribs on the but sections to maximize stiffness and torsional rigidity. Tubeset: Strength steering tube and fork 802N/mm2, top, down and seat tube 925N/mm2 and rear triangle 1315N/mm2.
- 753 - Heat-Treated Manganese-Molybdenum. Essentially 531 made with reduced wall thickness and heat treated to increase tensile strength. UTS: 1080-1280 MPa (70-83 Tsi, 157-186 ksi) Complete tube set of 11 tubes (Frame 8, Fork 3). 753 can only be lugged and fillet-brazed with an alloy of 56% silver below 700 degrees Celsius and sale is restricted only to approved builders certified by Reynolds
  - 753ATB - Mountain, All terrain, Off-road
  - 753R - Road tubeset
  - 753T - Thinner tube gauges for time trial framesets
  - 753OS - Oversize tubeset
- 853 - Seamless air-hardening heat-treated. UTS: 1250-1400 MPa, density 7.78 g/cm^{3}
  - 853OS - Oversize tubeset
- 921 - Cold-work stainless steel
- 931 - Precipitation hardening stainless steel. Tubing introduced in 2012. Can be used with 953 to reduce overall frame costs.
- 953 - Maraging stainless steel. Introduced in 2005. UTS: 1750-2050 MPa, density 7.8 g/cm^{3} No longer being sold.

=== Aluminium ===
- 7005 - Al-Zn alloy. UTS: 400 MPa, density 2.78 g/cm^{3}
- 6061 - Al-Si-Mg alloy. UTS: 325 MPa, density 2.70 g/cm^{3}
- X-100 - Al-Li Alloy. UTS: 550-600 MPa, density 2.65 g/cm^{3}

=== Titanium ===
- 6Al-4V - Seamless ELI Grade. UTS: 900-1150 MPa, density 4.42 g/cm^{3}
- 3Al-2.5V - Seamless. UTS: 810-960 MPa, density 4.48 g/cm^{3}
- CP 2 - Supplied to Raleigh during the 1990s

=== Magnesium ===
- MZM Electron - Magnesium alloy. UTS: ~300 MPa, density ~1.80 g/cm^{3}

== See also ==
- Columbus tubing
- Tange International Co.
