= Säurefabrik Schweizerhall =

Former Swiss chemical company

- Industry: Chemicals
- Founded: 1917
- Founders: Chemische Fabrik Schweizerhall; Ciba; Sandoz; Geigy; Chemische Fabrik Uetikon
- Fate: Integrated into CABB GmbH (2007)
- Headquarters: Pratteln, Switzerland
- Number of employees: 360 (2005)

Säurefabrik Schweizerhall ("Schweizerhall acid factory"), from 2001 SF-Chem AG, was a Swiss chemical company at Schweizerhalle in Pratteln. It was founded in 1917 by five chemical companies, was owned by Clariant and Syngenta until 2004, and was integrated into the German CABB group in 2007.

== History ==
Because of difficulties in importing sulfuric and hydrochloric acid during World War I, the Chemische Fabrik Schweizerhall, Sandoz, Geigy, the Chemische Fabrik Uetikon, and the company later known as Ciba founded the Säurefabrik Schweizerhall in 1917 on the Schweizerhalle industrial site in Pratteln. After poor business in the interwar period, the wartime boom of World War II brought higher sales, a more diversified product range, and the expansion of the plant.

The company, renamed SF-Chem AG in 2001, remained owned by the Basel chemical companies Clariant and Syngenta until 2004, when the Swiss investment company Capvis took it over. In 2005 it had 360 employees. In 2007 it was integrated into the German specialty chemicals group CABB GmbH.

== Bibliography ==
- Eugen Anton Meier, 50 Jahre Säurefabrik Schweizerhall. Eine kleine Jubiläumsschrift mit Beiträgen zur Geschichte des Roten Hauses, der Industriesiedlung Schweizerhalle und des Schwefels, 1967
- Neue Zürcher Zeitung, 23 September 2004; 19 July 2007

=== Archives ===
- Schweizerisches Wirtschaftsarchiv, Basel
- Staatsarchiv Basel-Landschaft, Liestal, Säurefabrik Schweizerhalle
