= Sandoz chemical spill =

November 1986 environmental disaster in Switzerland

Coordinates: 47°31′56″N 7°40′15″E

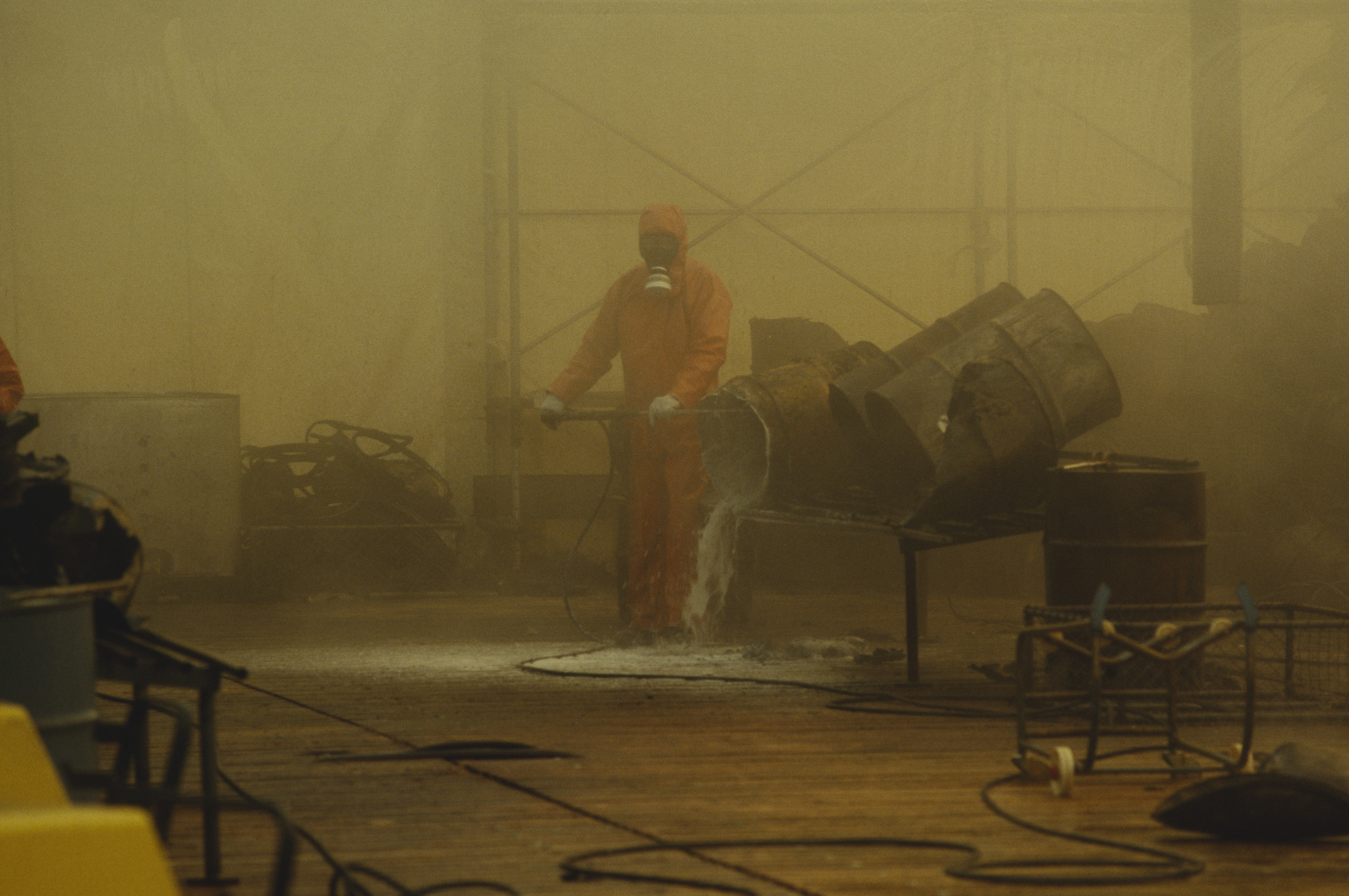
Cleanup efforts after the fire

The Sandoz chemical spill was a major environmental disaster caused by a fire and its subsequent extinguishing at Sandoz agrochemical storehouse in the Schweizerhalle industrial complex, Basel-Landschaft, Switzerland, on 1 November 1986, which released toxic agrochemicals into the air and resulted in tons of pollutants entering the Rhine river, turning it red.

The chemicals caused a massive mortality of wildlife downstream, killing, among other animals, a large proportion of the European eel population in the Rhine, although the situation subsequently recovered within a couple of years. Among the major resulting water pollutants were dinitro-ortho-cresol, the organophosphate chemicals propetamphos, parathion, disulfoton, thiometon, etrimphos and fenitrothion, as well as the organochlorine metoxuron.

The cause of the blaze was never established. In 2000, Vincent Cannistraro, a former senior U.S. intelligence official, stated that the Soviet KGB had ordered the East German Stasi to sabotage the chemical factory. According to him, the operation's objective was to distract attention from the Chernobyl disaster six months earlier in the Soviet Union. The Swiss authorities were considering opening investigations again. No evidence of this presumed sabotage has ever surfaced.

As a consequence of the incident Sandoz extended its health, safety and environment activities and introduced new procedures for risk and emergency management, including auditing.

== See also ==
- Environmental movement in Switzerland
- "Environment" in German, French and Italian in the online Historical Dictionary of Switzerland.
