= Gordon Wolstenholme =

British medical doctor

Sir Gordon Ethelbert Ward Wolstenholme, OBE, FRCP (28 May 1913 – 29 May 2004) was a British medical doctor, and the founding director of the Ciba Foundation.

== Early life and education ==
He was born in Sheffield, the son of a mechanical engineer, and educated at Repton School and Corpus Christi College, Cambridge. He studied medicine at the Middlesex Hospital Medical School and qualified with the Conjoint diploma LRCP MRCS in 1939 after which he obtained the Cambridge MA in 1940. After leaving the army he graduated MB BChir at Cambridge in 1948.

From 1940 to 1947 he served with the Royal Army Medical Corps, retiring as a lieutenant-colonel. He was appointed an Officer of the Order of the British Empire (OBE) for his military work in the provision of blood for transfusions throughout Europe and the Middle East. On his return to Britain he was appointed to the post of founding director of the Ciba Foundation (now Novartis Foundation), an organisation established to encourage international co-operation in scientific research.

He was President of the Royal Society of Medicine from 1975 to 1977, Harveian Librarian of the Royal College of Physicians from 1979 to 1989 and Master of the Worshipful Society of Apothecaries from 1979 to 1980. He was knighted in 1976.

== Personal life ==
He died in 2004 and was survived by his second wife Dushanka.

His grandson is American music producer Alex Pall of The Chainsmokers.
