= Klaus M. Leisinger =

Swiss social scientist and economist (born 1947)

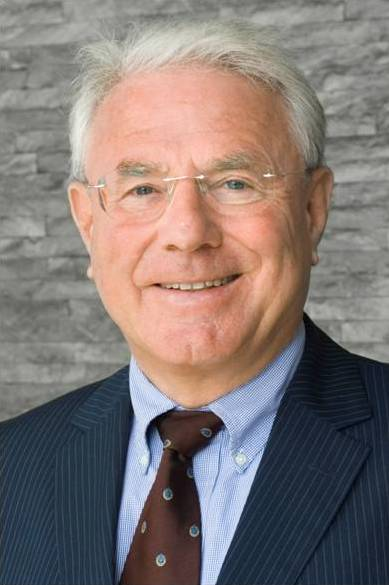
Klaus M. Leisinger (2006)

Klaus M. Leisinger (born 6 February 1947 in Lörrach) is a social scientist and economist. He is founder and president of the Global Values Alliance in Basel. Until 2012 he was managing director and chairman of the Board of Trustees of the Novartis Foundation (formerly Novartis Foundation for Sustainable Development) in Basel, Switzerland.

== Biography ==
Klaus M. Leisinger was born in Lörrach in 1947. He studied economics and social sciences at the University of Basel (Switzerland).

He did his doctoral theses in development studies and his habilitation treatise on "Health Policy for Least Developed Countries". His professional career took him for several years to East Africa as CEO of the former Ciba Pharmaceuticals regional office. After his return to headquarters in Switzerland, he was responsible for the company’s international relations. He was profoundly engaged in corporate responsibility issues and actively promoted a corporate culture of dialogue with stakeholders in international policy, development cooperation and business ethics.

From 1996 until February 2012, Leisinger was President and Managing Director of the Novartis Foundation, formerly the Novartis Foundation for Sustainable Development, which is funded by the pharmaceutical company Novartis. In September 2013, he stepped down as Chairman of the Board of Trustees of the Novartis Foundation. Under the leadership of Klaus Leisinger, the Novartis Foundation united and embodied the historical commitment to corporate philanthropy of the Basel chemical industry and earned consultative status with the UN ECOSOC. Its comprehensive, stakeholder-oriented development policy approach and the social development and healthcare program results in cooperation with partners became a professional resource and private-sector model for significant institutions and organizations (such as the World Bank, the UNDP, UNICEF, the Asian Development Bank, the Swiss Agency for Development and Cooperation).

Klaus Leisinger is also Professor of Sociology at the University of Basel, where he pursues research and teaches a wide range of topics related to international development and health policy as well as business ethics, corporate responsibility, and business and human rights. He has widely contributed to the academic debate through articles in peer reviewed journals and books in several languages. He served as an invited lecturer at several European universities, as well as the University of Notre Dame, the MIT Sloan School of Management (Cambridge), DePaul University and the Harvard University. He is a member of the European Academy of Sciences and Arts and was awarded an honorary doctorate in Theology by the University of Fribourg (Switzerland) in November 2004.

He has held numerous advisory positions in organizations such as the UN Global Compact, the United Nations Development Program (UNDP), the World Bank and the World Economic Forum (Global Agenda on Human Rights). In addition, he is president of the Board of Trustees of the German Network of Business Ethics, a member of the advisory council of Mary Robinson's Ethical Globalization Initiative (EGI) and a member of the Board of the United Nations Association of Germany (DGNV). Kofi Annan appointed Klaus Leisinger Special Advisor to the United Nations Secretary General for the UN Global Compact. This mandate ended with Kofi Annan’s tenure on 31 December 2006. Klaus Leisinger was a member of the high-level Commission on Information and Accountability for Women’s and Children's Health. Until 2012, he served as the Co-Chairman of the Digital Health Initiative – a unique multi-stakeholder collaboration between the ICT and healthcare sectors to implement the Millennium Development Goals. He is also a member of the Broadband Commission for Digital Development, the steering committee of the UN Global Compact’s LEAD Initiative, and the UN ECOSOC Development Cooperation Forum. He is the chairman of the Board of Trustees of the German Network Business Ethics, and a member of the Executive Committee of the German Society for the United Nations.

In November 2014, Leisinger was appointed member of the "Leadership Council" by the Sustainable Development Solutions Network (led by Prof. Jeffery Sachs, Earth Institute, Columbia University, New York). For his "Outstanding Contribution" in the fight against leprosy, Leisinger received the 2012 Republic of Korea Hansen Grand Award on 4 December 2012.

In 2015, Leisinger accepted the invitation to serve as a member of a research consortium (TRUST) financed by the European Commission (Horizon 2020). The focus of his work is to help develop in a stakeholder-oriented approach a code of conduct for responsible research, particularly in the context of clinical trials of pharmaceutical corporations in low- and middle income countries.

In 2016 Klaus Leisinger was invited by the Pontifical Academia Scientiarum to join the core steering group of the initiative Ethics in Action, aimed at promoting integral human and sustainable development, in response to Pope Francis’ encyclical laudato si’.

== Specialist areas/fields of research ==
He pursues his academic research and practical field work in the areas of corporate responsibility of companies in developing countries, corporate ethics, access to medicines for those living in poverty and international development cooperations, the provision of medicines for those living in poverty and corporate responsibilities for the implementation of the Agenda 2030 for Sustainable Development. He also contributes to the discourse on "Business and Human Rights”.

== Works/publications ==
Klaus M. Leisinger has written and published numerous publications in several languages. His recent works include:

- Unternehmensethik. Globale Verantwortung und Modernes Management, C.H. Beck, München 1997, ISBN 3-406-42289-6; also published in Brazil as Etica Empresarial. Responsabilidade global a gerenciamento moderno, Editora Vozes, Petropolis 2001 (co-author Karin M. Schmitt).
- Die Sechste Milliarde. Weltbevölkerungswachstum und Nachhaltige Entwicklung. With a foreword of the former executive director of UNFPA, Dr. Nafis Sadik, C.H. Beck, München 1999, ISBN 3-406-42140-7.
- Six Billion and Counting: Population Growth and Food Security in the 21st century. In: Johns Hopkins University Press / IFPRI, Baltimore / Washington D.C 2002; also published in Chinese, 3rd edition, Beijing, 2003 (co-authors: Karin Schmitt and Rajul Pandya-Lorch).
- Corporate Ethics in a Time of Globalization (co-author and publisher Karin M. Schmitt) Sarvodaya Vishca Lekha Publishers, Colombo 2003, ISBN 955-599-333-5.
- Whistleblowing and Corporate Reputation Management, Rainer Hampp Verlag (sfwu, Schriftenreihe für Wirtschafts- und Unternehmensethik), München und Mering 2003, ISBN 3-87988-731-4.
- Ethik im Management (published with Hans Ruh), Orell Füssli, Zürich 2004, ISBN 3-280-05104-5.
- Holzwege für den aufrechten Gang. Christliche Werte als Handlungsorientierung für unternehmerische Entscheidungen. In: Freiburger Zeitschrift für Philosophie und Theologie, Academic Press Fribourg, volume 52, edition 3 (2005), p. 628-679.
- Capitalism with a Human Face. The UN Global Compact. In: The Journal of Corporate Citizenship, 28th edition (2007), p. 113-132.
- Corporate philanthropy: The "top of the pyramid". In: Business and Society Review, volume 112, 3rd edition (2007), p. 315-342.
- Zur Relevanz der Unternehmensethik in der Betriebswirtschaftslehre. In: Schmalenbachs Zeitschrift für betriebswirtschaftliche Forschung, special edition 58 / 8 October 2008, p. 26-49.
- Corporate Responsibilities for Access to Medicines. In: Journal of Business Ethics, volume 85, 1st edition (2009), p. 3ff.
- On Corporate Responsibility for Human Rights. In: Spitzeck H. /Pirson M. / Amann W. / Khan S. / Kimakowitz E.v. (EDS.): Humanism in Business, Cambridge University Press, Cambridge 2009, p. 175-203.
- The Role of Corporations in Shaping Globalization with a Human Face. In: Straus J. (Ed.): The Role of Law and Ethics in the Globalized Economy, Springer, Heidelberg 2009, p. 27-48.
- Manifest Globales Wirtschaftsethos. Konsequenzen und Herausforderungen für die Weltwirtschaft. Manifesto Global Economic Ethic. Consequences and Challenges for Global Businesses. München: dtv 2010, together with Küng, H., Wieland, J.. ISBN 978-3-423-34628-3
- Poverty, Diseases, and Medicines in Low-and Middle-Income Countries: The Roles and Responsibilities of Pharmaceutical Corporations. In Business & Professional Ethics Journal Vol.31 (2012) No.1, 135–185.
- Corporate Responsibility and Corporate Philanthropy (with Karin Schmitt), June 2012 UN Development Cooperation Forum
- Global Values for Global Development (September 2014) Working Paper for the Sustainable Development Solutions Network
- Corporate Sustainability, Global Values and Pluralistic Societies: What can we know? What ought we to do? What may we hope?
- Corporate Responsibility in a World of Cultural Diversity and Pluralism of Values, Journal of International Business Ethics, Vol.8 No.2 2015, pp 9 – 36

For more publications see
