= Barilla (company) =

Italian multinational food company

- Type: Società per azioni
- Industry: Food processing
- Founded: 1877; 149 years ago
- Founder: Pietro Barilla Sr.
- Headquarters: Parma, Italy
- Area served: Worldwide
- Key people: Guido Barilla (chairman)
- Products: Pasta; ready-made sauces; bakery products; biscuits; toasted bread; cereals; snacks; pastries; soft bread; brioches; power snacks; cakes and crisp bread
- Revenue: ▲€4.837 billion (2025)
- Operating income: ▲€371 million (2025)
- Net income: ▲€233 million (2025)
- Total assets: ▲€4.483 billion (2025)
- Total equity: ▲€2.353 billion (2025)
- Number of employees: 8,823 (2025)
- Divisions: 21 brands
- Website: barillagroup.com

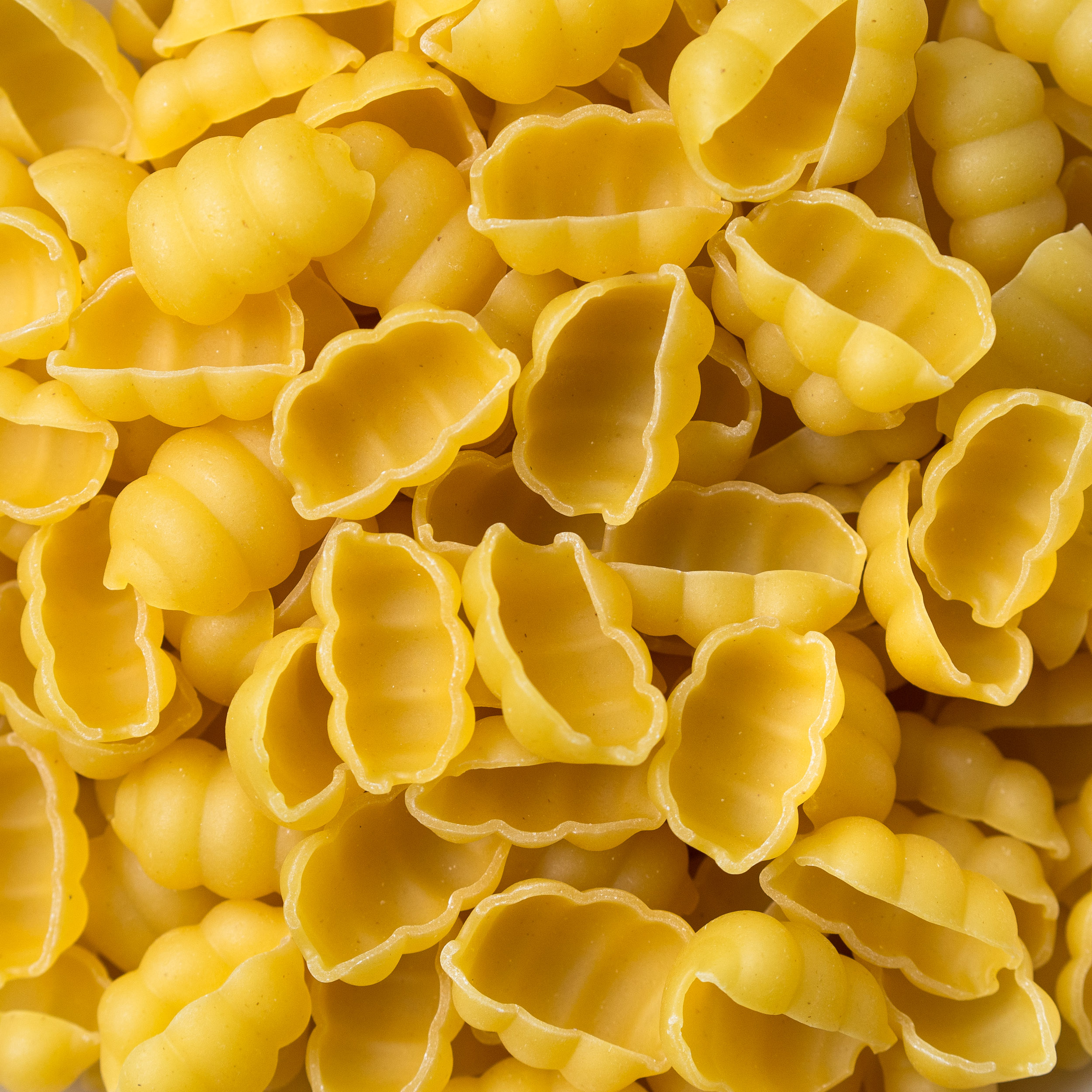
Barilla dry pasta

Barilla Group is an Italian multinational food company founded in 1877. It is the world's largest pasta producer. The company operates 30 production sites, half of which are located in Italy.

== History ==
The company was founded in 1877 as a bakery shop in Parma, Italy, by Pietro Barilla Sr. The company expanded in 1908, and in 1910 Barilla inaugurated a new pasta factory equipped with a "continuous baking" oven.

After the death of Pietro Barilla Sr. in 1912, his sons Riccardo and Gualtiero took the reins of the family company, increasing the production and distribution of products, thanks to technological innovations which allowed the company to rapidly transform itself, over the course of the 1920s and 1930s, into the most important bread and pasta company in Emilia-Romagna.

In 1919, Gualtiero Barilla died, leaving his brother Riccardo at the helm of the company together with his wife Virginia.

In 1947, Riccardo also died and the management passed to his sons Pietro and Gianni, exponents of the third generation.

With the advent of the two Barilla brothers, the company experienced a phase of great development, and in 1952, the production of bread was suspended to concentrate solely on pasta. In those years, Barilla quickly transformed itself from a regional company to a company with a strong presence in northern Italy, thanks to the quality of the products, the balanced prices and its innovative capacity, such as the use of cardboard to pack pasta.

In 1960, Barilla became a joint-stock company, and in the following years it opened new factories, in Rubbiano, which marked Barilla's entry into the cracker and breadsticks sector, and in Pedrignano, just outside Parma.

The company remained in the hands of the Barilla family until 1971, when the American chemical company W. R. Grace acquired a controlling interest. However, Grace left day-to-day control in the hands of Pietro Barilla, grandson and namesake of the company founder. Pietro reacquired control in 1979, and the company has remained privately held ever since.

In 1993, Pietro Barilla died at the age of 80 and the management of the company passed to his children Guido, Luca, and Paolo. This led to the fourth Barilla generation, and throughout the nineties the company continued the internationalization process, which began at the beginning of the decade under the management of Pietro, opening in 1999 the first production plant in Iowa, in the United States.

This expansion continued with the acquisition of various foreign companies in the food sector, such as the MISKO pasta company in Greece (1991), the Turkish pasta company Filiz Makarna (1994), the Swedish crispbread producer Wasabröd (1999), the joint venture with the Mexican Herdez in 2002 (pasta brands Yemina and Vesta). In 2002 Barilla took over the German company Kamps AG, which was then sold to the Czech Agrofert in 2013, except for the French soft bread company Harrys, which still belongs to the Barilla Group. In 2007 Barilla opened a second production plant in the United States, in Avon, New York.

At the beginning of 2021, Barilla finalized the acquisitions in Canada of the Catelli company (including Lancia) and, in the United Kingdom, of the majority stake in Pasta Evangelists, a London-based start-up for the production of fresh pasta for home delivery.

In December 2022, the Group also acquired Back To Nature, an American brand specialising in plant-based, non-GMO products.

== Overview ==
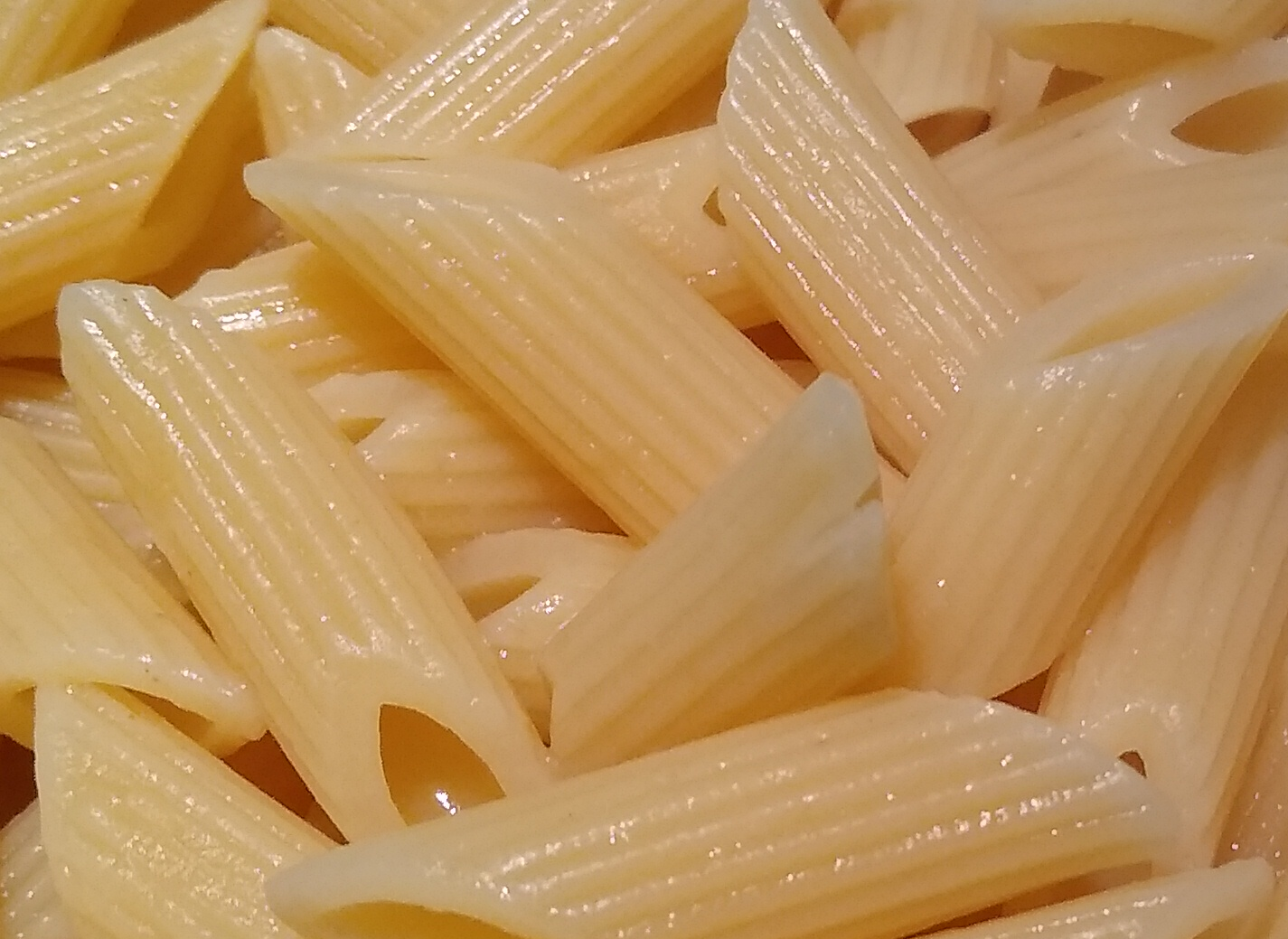
Barilla penne

The Barilla family has been at the helm of the company, since its foundation in 1877. Barilla Group controls Barilla (multinational pasta and sauces maker), Artisia, Mulino Bianco, GranCereale, Pan di Stelle, Pavesini, Ringo, Togo, Gran Pavesi, Gocciole, Voiello, First (Italy), Harrys (France), Wasabröd (Sweden), Catelli (Canada), MISKO (Greece), Pasta Evangelists (United Kingdom), Filiz Makarna (Turkey), Back To Nature (United States), Yemina (Mexico) trademarks, Barilla For Professionals.

The group produces many types of pasta, and is the world's leading pasta maker with 24.5% of the Italian market. It produces pasta in over 160 shapes and sizes. Barilla brand pasta is sold in numerous restaurants worldwide, such as those belonging to the Pastamania chain. It is also the leading seller of bakery products in Italy and ready-made sauces in Europe. Through its acquisition of the Swedish company Wasa, it is the world's leading producer of flatbread (a Scandinavian staple), selling 60,000 tons annually.

Barilla Group has 30 production sites, 15 in Italy and 15 in the rest of the world: production plants are located in Italy and in Greece, France, Germany, Russia, Sweden, Turkey, the United States (in Ames, Iowa and Avon, New York), Mexico and Canada. The company also operates mills in Italy, Greece, Sweden, Turkey, the United States and Canada. While its central office is in Parma, it has corporate offices in several other countries as well, such as Austria, Belgium, France, Germany, Greece, the Netherlands, Poland, Russia, Slovenia, Sweden, Switzerland, Turkey, the US, Mexico, Brazil, Australia and Japan. Barilla is distributed in the UK by Euro Food Brands Ltd. Barilla's Italian production facilities are located in Parma, Foggia, Marcianise, Castiglione delle Stiviere, Cremona, Melfi, Rubbiano, Novara, Muggia and Ascoli Piceno. Its plant in Greece (near Thiva) is the third largest in Europe. The plant where the pasta was made is noted on the packaging by a code letter, whereas products made in Italy are explicitly labeled as such.

In 2025, the company had a turnover of €4.837 billion, with a net profit of 233 million euros.

In 2026, for the third year in a row, Barilla was ranked as the first food company in the 2026 Global RepTrak® 100 rankings for its reputation, also entering the global Top 10, ranking 9th place overall.

== Other activities ==
In 1987, on the initiative of Pietro Barilla, the Barilla Historical Archive was created to collect, preserve and enhance the company's historical documentation, starting from 1877. The archive is located in the Barilla plant in Pedrignano, near Parma, and it contains over 60,000 documents divided by sector, also including the documentation produced by the brands subsequently incorporated into the company: Voiello, Mulino Bianco, Pavesi, Filiz, Wasa, Harrys.

On 30 November 1999, the Italian Ministry of Culture declared the Barilla Historical Archive "of remarkable historical interest" because it "bears witness to the development of the food industry in Parma and the evolution of society in Italy".

Since 2018 the new internet site is active and available, in which it is possible to visit the different sections of the archive, among which are the photo library and TV advertising with more than 2,700 commercials.

The Barilla Historical Archive, in 2001, has been among the founding partners of Museimpresa, an Italian association that collects more than 100 members as Museums, Archives and Cultural Institutions and that represents a useful place for meetings, changes of experiences and knowledge.

In 2014, the Barilla Historical Archive contributed to the installation, at Corte di Giarola near Collecchio (Parma), an ancient 11th century Benedictine Grancia, the Museum of Pasta, with equipment and documents of extraordinary interest, including an entire pasta plant dating back to 1850 and the oldest sample of industrial spaghetti dating back to 1837. The Museum of Pasta is inserted in the circuit of Museums of Food of the province of Parma, as well as the Museum of Tomato, installed in the same Corte di Giarola.

In 2009, the BCFN - Barilla Center for Food & Nutrition (now "Fondazione Barilla") was established: it is a multidisciplinary, independent think tank working for food sustainability and healthy lifestyles.

=== Sponsorship and promotion ===
As of 2020 the 'global testimonial' of the company is Roger Federer. The company has sponsored the Italian national basketball team on several occasions, as well as the Italian race car driver Alex Zanardi. Furthermore, Barilla is currently the main sponsor of the US alpine skier Mikaela Shiffrin and Racing Bulls F1 Team.

In 2021, Barilla created a Spotify playlist with songs timed just long enough for the perfect pasta.

In 2025, Formula One announced a partnership with Barilla as the sport's "official pasta partner".

Meredith Hayden has promoted some of their products, such as their pasta.

== Barilla Hellas A.E. ==
Barilla Hellas A.E., known by its domestic trade name MISKO (Greek: Μίσκο), is a Greek company, owned by Barilla Group, that produces and sells pasta in Greece. It also serves other parts of the world, particularly the Greek diaspora.

MISKO, the largest pasta producer in Greece, was founded in Piraeus in 1927 and was acquired by Barilla in 1991, selling Barilla's pasta and sauces along its own product line-up. In 2000, the company built a new production facility in Boeotia which is the third largest in Europe.

== Controversies ==
In 2013, after the chairman Guido Barilla made comments regarding his opposition to adoption by gay families and unwillingness to showcase gay families in his advertisements, some called for a boycott against Barilla products. Guido later apologized, and the company began advocating for LGBTQ causes. The company has partnered with the Reuters Foundation on the OpenlyNews initiative, a global LGBTQ news platform.

In 2016, Barilla committed to use 100% cage-free eggs by 2020, responding to pressure from animal welfare groups. In 2019, Barilla announced that they reached this goal one year ahead of schedule.

In 2022, two Americans filed a class action suit in a California court against Barilla. They accused the company of emphasizing its Italian identity while the majority of its products are manufactured in the United States. Barilla attempted to have the case dismissed, but a judge ruled that the plaintiffs had suffered "economic injury" due to the deceptive advertising.

In April 2022, following the Russian invasion of Ukraine, Barilla announced the suspension of all new investments and advertising activities in Russia, limiting production to essential food items such as pasta and bread, and committed not to profit from its presence in the country. Despite these measures, Barilla's Russian subsidiary reported a significant increase in financial performance for 2022, with gross profit rising to 3.6 billion rubles from 2.8 billion rubles in 2021, and profit from sales increasing to 1.3 billion rubles from 204.6 million rubles. As of December 2024, Barilla continues its operations in Russia.
