= Novartis Foundation =

Swiss non-profit organization

- Formerly: Basel Foundation for Developing Countries (founded 1961), Ciba-Geigy Foundation for Cooperation with Developing Countries (as of 1979), Novartis Foundation for Sustainable Development (as of 1996)
- Type: Foundation
- Industry: Pharmaceutical Industry
- Founded: June 1, 1979
- Headquarters: Basel, Switzerland
- Key people: Ann Aerts, MD (Head)
- Website: www.novartisfoundation.org

The Novartis Foundation (formerly known as the Novartis Foundation for Sustainable Development) is a non-profit organization and part of the corporate responsibility portfolio of Novartis in Basel, Switzerland. The foundation conducts projects to improve health, mostly in sub-Saharan Africa and in south-east Asia.

== History ==
The Novartis Foundation has been one of the leading organizations in the private sector for international development for the last 35 years. The humanitarian engagement of the Novartis Foundation goes back to the 1960s, when the Basel-based companies Ciba, Geigy, Sandoz, Durand & Huguenin, Hoffmann-La Roche and Lonza founded the Basel Foundation for Developing Countries. The Basel Foundation, for example, supported the field laboratory of the Swiss Tropical Institute (now known as the Ifakara Health Institute) located in Ifakara, which still works closely with the Novartis Foundation.

Today, the Novartis Foundation focuses its work on the fight against leprosy and malaria, as well as on access to healthcare projects. The foundation acts as facilitator between the private sector, the state and civil society.

== Projects ==
The Novartis Foundation supports access to healthcare in sub-Saharan Africa and on the Indian subcontinent. The aim is to improve access to primary healthcare and to strengthen the local healthcare systems.

The foundation fosters health policy among the private sector, non-governmental organizations, research institutions and state organizations. The foundation organizes an international symposium in Basel every year.

== Other organisations called 'Novartis Foundation' ==
The Novartis Foundation was a scientific and educational charity, formed in 1949 by the Swiss company Ciba, now Novartis, and dissolved in 2008. It was the direct successor to the Ciba Foundation, and the changed name (Novartis Foundation) reflected the new name of Ciba, after merging with Sandoz. The Foundation was the brainchild of Robert Käppeli, managing director (and later president) of Ciba. The purpose of the institution was to promote collaboration in the medical sciences by the organisation of symposia which would allow experts of different fields to share ideas. Symposia took place both at their London premises and also in locations across the globe. Later these discussions were written up by in-house editors and published by John Wiley & Sons, with whom the foundation had a long-standing relationship.

Novartis, though it provided financial support for the foundation, was not (in later years) represented on the board of trustees and occupied only a minority of seats on the executive council. The company withdrew their financial support from the foundation in February 2008. The trustees chose to undergo a merger with the Academy of Medical Sciences, which occurred on 31 July 2008 prior to the dissolution of the foundation later that year The foundation had its headquarters at 41 Portland Place in central London, UK. The headquarters was refurbished and reopened by the Academy of Medical Sciences in 2010.
