= Guido Barilla =

Italian businessman (born 1958)

- Born: 30 July 1958 (age 68); Milan, Italy
- Occupation: Businessman
- Title: Chairman, Barilla Group
- Spouse: Married
- Children: 5
- Parent: Pietro Barilla
- Relatives: Paolo Barilla (brother); Luca Barilla (brother)

Guido Barilla (born 30 July 1958) is an Italian billionaire businessman, and the chairman of Barilla Group, the world's largest pasta company, which is 85% owned by Guido, his sister and two of his brothers.

== Early life ==
Guido Barilla was born on 30 July 1958 in Milan, Italy. He studied in the United States and in Italy, where he studied Philosophy at the Università Statale di Milano.

== Career ==
He started his career in 1982, in the sales department of Barilla France. In 1986, he became a senior manager and led the international expansion of the company. In 1988, he became Barilla deputy chairman, and since October 1993 has been the chairman.

Since 2009, he has been chairman of the Barilla Center for Food & Nutrition, now Fondazione Barilla.

In a 2013 radio interview, Barilla stated his opposition to adoptions by same-sex couples and said that he "disagrees" with homosexuals. The comments were viewed as homophobic, and, although Barilla apologized for "having offended the sensibilities of many", critics like Alessandro Zan felt the apology was insufficient and encouraged a boycott of Barilla's company. The negative reaction led to changes, and a year later, the company received a top rating from the Human Rights Campaign's list of employers who are LGBT-friendly.

== Parma Calcio 1913 ==
In 2015, Barilla became a part owner of the Phoenix club Parma Calcio 1913.

== Honours ==
In May 2019, he was awarded the title Knight of the Order of Merit for Labour.

== Other activities ==
- Danone, Member of the Mission Committee (since 2020)
- European Round Table of Industrialists (ERT), Member

== Personal life ==
Barilla is married, with five children, and lives in Parma, Italy.
