= Luca Barilla =

Italian businessman

- Born: May 12, 1960 (age 66); Milan, Italy
- Occupation: Businessman
- Title: Deputy chairman, Barilla Group
- Relatives: Guido Barilla (brother); Paolo Barilla (brother)

Luca Barilla (born May 12, 1960 in Milan) is an Italian billionaire businessman, and the deputy chairman of Barilla Group, the world's largest pasta company, which is 85% owned by Luca, his brothers Guido and Paolo, and a sister.

Barilla began participating in the family business in 1980. In 1984, after completing his studies in the United States and military service in the Italian military police force Carabinieri, he was appointed to the position of product manager. He carried out the professional training in the Company, first at the subsidiary Barilla France in Paris and then in the American headquarters of the Group.

In 1987, Luca Barilla became a member of the family Group's Board of Directors, of which he was elected Deputy Chairman the following year. He has been holding this position since that date, being the current Deputy Chairman of the Group.

In 1997 Luca Barilla was appointed President of GranMilano, a leader company in the production of confectionery products. He held this position until 2008, when the brand was sold.

In 2018 he, along with his wife Michela Petronio, purchased the Pastiglie Leone.
