= Paolo Barilla =

Italian racing driver and businessman (born 1961)

- Born: 20 April 1961 (age 65); Milan, Italy
- Occupation: Businessman
- Title: Deputy chairman, Barilla Group
- Relatives: Guido Barilla (brother); Luca Barilla (brother)

Formula One World Championship career
- Nationality: (Italy) Italian
- Active years: 1989 - 1990
- Team: Minardi
- Entries: 15 (9 starts)
- Championships: 0
- Wins: 0
- Podiums: 0
- Career points: 0
- Pole positions: 0
- Fastest laps: 0
- First entry: 1989 Japanese Grand Prix
- Last entry: 1990 Spanish Grand Prix

Paolo Barilla (born 20 April 1961) is a former racing driver and a businessman. He competed in Formula One racing for the Minardi team and won of the 1985 24 Hours of Le Mans. Following his retirement from racing, Barilla started working for the Barilla Group. As of January 2017 he is the Deputy Chairman and has a net worth of US$1.39 billion.

== Racing career ==
Barilla started racing in 1975 and won the Italian 100cc karting title the following year. He entered Formula Abarth in 1980 and the next year moved up to Formula 3, in which he won some races and finished third in the Italian Championship. In 1982 he entered Formula 2 with Minardi, and between 1983 and 1988 competed in sports car racing, winning 24 Hours of Le Mans by a three-lap margin in 1985. Barilla mostly raced for the Joest Racing Porsche 956, co-driving with Klaus Ludwig, Paul Belmondo, Marc Duez and Louis Krages (also known at the time as John Winter).

In 1987, Barilla returned to single-seaters and raced in the Japanese Formula 3000 Championship. In 1989 he tested for Minardi in Formula One and replaced Pierluigi Martini at Suzuka. The following year he was signed to drive for the team. Barilla failed to qualify regularly and was replaced for the last two races of the season by Gianni Morbidelli.

In 2014, Barilla won the Monaco Historic Grand Prix in the Formula 3 class driving a Chevron B34.

== Business career ==
In 1990, Barilla retired from racing and joined his family's businesses. Upon his return to the corporation, he briefly filled in as the CEO from 1999 to 2000 before taking a more permanent position as a Deputy Chairman.

In 2010, Barilla was appointed President of the Industrial Association AIDEPI (Associazione delle Industrie Dolciarie e Pastaie Italiane), established in the same year. From 2010 onwards, he held numerous membership positions until he was appointed, in 2014, Vice-president of the Barilla Center for Food & Nutrition Foundation, a multidisciplinary and independent thinking center that works on food sustainability.

In 2016, Barilla was elected President of the International Pasta Organization (IPO), a non-profit association dedicated to increasing consumption and awareness of pasta, promoting consumer understanding of the nutritional value and health benefits of food.

From March 2017 to December 2018, Barilla was Chairman of the Italian Food Association (Unione Italiana Food), and since 1 January 2019, he has taken on the role of Deputy Vice-Chairman, a position aligned with the commitments taken to protect the industry, both nationally and internationally.

Since July 2020, Barilla is a member of the Confindustria Executive Council (Consiglio Direttivo).

== Racing record ==
=== Complete European Formula Two Championship results ===
(key) (Races in bold indicate pole position; races in italics indicate fastest lap)

Year	Entrant	Chassis	Engine	1	2	3	4	5	6	7	8	9	10	11	12	13	Pos.	Pts
1981	Minardi Team	Minardi Fly 281	Ferrari	SIL	HOC	THR	NÜR	VLL	MUG	PAU	PER; Ret	SPA					NC	0
1981	Minardi Team	Minardi Fly 281	BMW										DON; 10	MIS	MAN		NC	0
1982	Minardi Team Srl	Minardi Fly 281B	BMW	SIL; 7	HOC; Ret	THR; 7	NÜR; 15	MUG; Ret	VLL; 11	PAU; DNQ	SPA; 12	HOC; 12	DON; DSQ	MAN; Ret	PER; Ret	MIS; 8	NC	0
1983	Minardi Team Srl	Minardi M283	BMW	SIL	THR	HOC	NÜR	VLL	PAU	JAR	DON	MIS	PER	ZOL; Ret	MUG		NC	0

=== Complete International Formula 3000 results ===
(key) (Races in bold indicate pole position; races in italics indicate fastest lap.)

Year	Entrant	Chassis	Engine	1	2	3	4	5	6	7	8	9	10	11	Pos.	Pts
1986	San Remo Racing	March 85B	Cosworth	SIL	VLL	PAU	SPA	IMO	MUG	PER	ÖST	BIR	BUG; DNQ	JAR	NC	0
1987	Pavesi Racing	Ralt RT21	Cosworth	SIL; 11	VLL; 17	SPA; Ret	PAU; 8	DON; 10		BRH; Ret	BIR; Ret	IMO; 8	BUG; 17		NC	0
1987	Pavesi Racing	Ralt RT20	Cosworth						PER; 7					JAR; DNQ	NC	0
1988	Cobra International	March 88B	Cosworth	JER; Ret											17th	3
1988	Spirit TOM's Racing	Reynard 88D	Cosworth		VLL; DNQ	PAU; Ret	SIL; Ret	MNZ; Ret	PER; DNQ	BRH; 4	BIR				17th	3
1988	Jordan Racing	Reynard 88D	Cosworth									BUG; Ret	ZOL; Ret	DIJ; 7	17th	3

=== Complete Japanese Formula 3000 Championship results ===
(key) (Races in bold indicate pole position) (Races in italics indicate fastest lap)

Year	Team	Engine	1	2	3	4	5	6	7	8	DC	Pts
1989	PIAA Nakajima Racing	Mugen Honda	SUZ; 8	FUJ; Ret	NIS; 2	SUZ; Ret	SUG; Ret	FUJ; Ret	SUZ; 10	SUZ; Ret	11th	6

=== Complete Formula One results ===
(key)

Year	Entrant	Chassis	Engine	1	2	3	4	5	6	7	8	9	10	11	12	13	14	15	16	WDC	Pts
1989	Minardi Team SpA	Minardi M189	Ford Cosworth DFR 3.5 V8	BRA	SMR	MON	MEX	USA	CAN	FRA	GBR	GER	HUN	BEL	ITA	POR	ESP	JPN; Ret	AUS	NC	0
1990	SCM Minardi Team	Minardi M189	Ford Cosworth DFR 3.5 V8	USA; Ret	BRA; Ret															NC	0
1990	SCM Minardi Team	Minardi M190	Ford Cosworth DFR 3.5 V8			SMR; 11	MON; Ret	CAN; DNQ	MEX; 14	FRA; DNQ	GBR; 12	GER; DNQ	HUN; 15	BEL; Ret	ITA; DNQ	POR; DNQ	ESP; DNQ	JPN	AUS	NC	0

=== 24 Hours of Le Mans results ===
Year	Team	Co-Drivers	Car	Class	Laps	Pos.	Class Pos.
1983	(Italy) Martini Racing	(Italy) Alessandro Nannini (France) Jean-Claude Andruet	Lancia LC2-Ferrari	C	135	DNF	DNF
1984	(Italy) Martini Racing	(Italy) Mauro Baldi (Germany) Hans Heyer	Lancia LC2-Ferrari	C1	275	DNF	DNF
1985	(West Germany) New-Man Joest Racing	(West Germany) Klaus Ludwig (West Germany) Louis Krages	Porsche 956B	C1	374	**1st**	**1st**
1986	(West Germany) Joest Racing	(West Germany) Klaus Ludwig (West Germany) Louis Krages	Porsche 956B	C1	196	DNF	DNF
1988	(Japan) Toyota Team Tom's	(United Kingdom) Tiff Needell (Japan) Hitoshi Ogawa	Toyota 88C	C1	283	24th	15th
1989	(Japan) Toyota Team Tom's	(Japan) Hitoshi Ogawa (United States) Ross Cheever	Toyota 89C-V	C1	45	DNF	DNF

Sporting positions
Preceded by Klaus Ludwig; Henri Pescarolo	Winner of the 24 Hours of Le Mans; 1985; With: Klaus Ludwig & Louis Krages	Succeeded by Derek Bell; Hans-Joachim Stuck; Al Holbert
