= Voiello =

Italian pasta manufacturer

- Type: Public
- Industry: Food
- Founded: 1879; 147 years ago
- Founder: Teodoro Voiello
- Headquarters: Marcianise, Italy
- Products: Pasta
- Parent: Barilla Group
- Website: www.voiello.it

Voiello is an Italian food company based in Torre Annunziata, specialized in pasta manufacturing. It operates under Barilla Group as a premium brand.
