= Schweizerhalle =

Industrial zone in Basel-Country, Switzerland

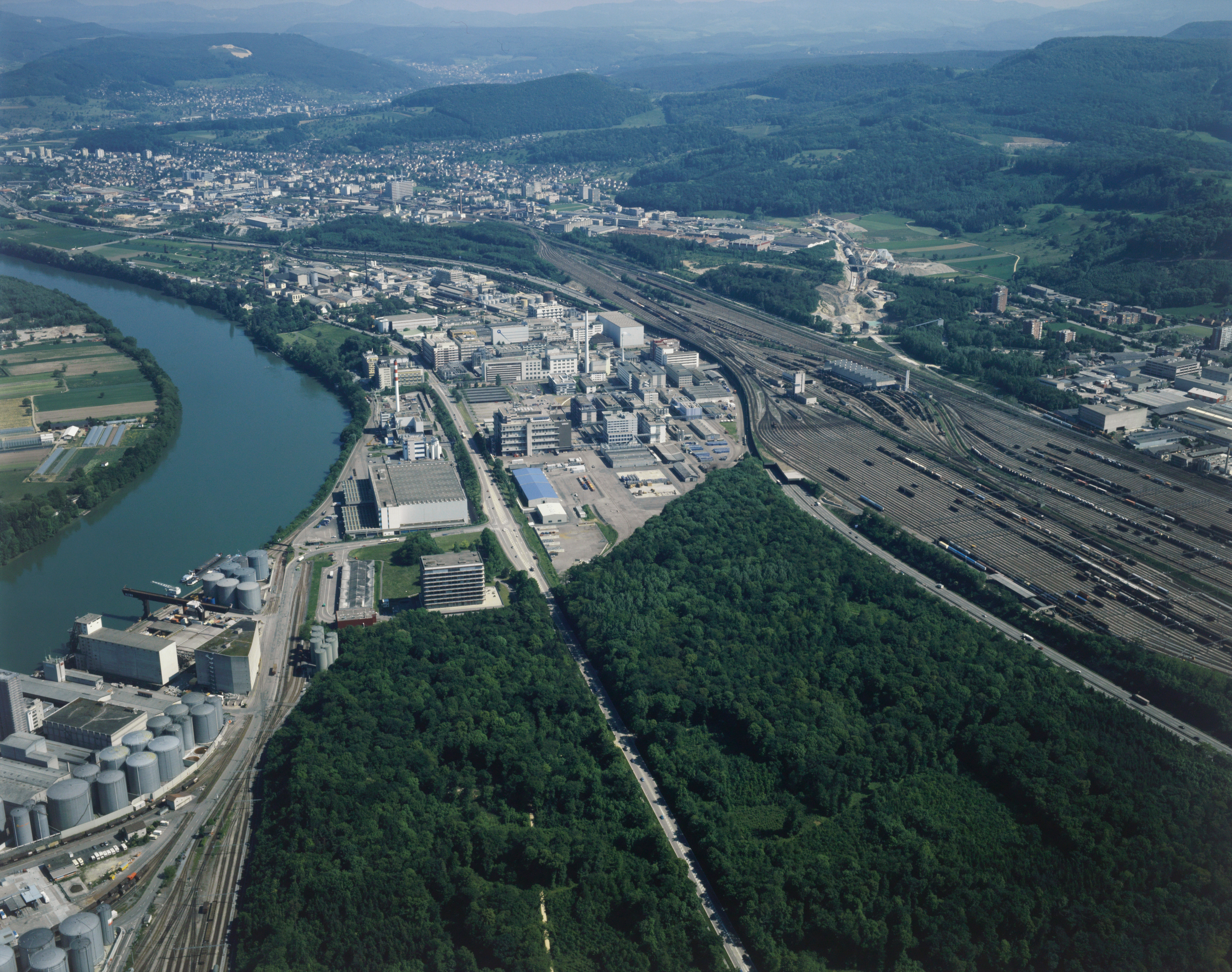
Aerial view of the Schweizerhalle industrial area (1995, looking east)

Schweizerhalle is an industrial zone on the border of the Basel-Country municipalities of Pratteln and Muttenz, known for its salt works and chemical industry.

== History ==
The alluvial area along the road between Basel and Rheinfelden, above the Hard forest, remained agricultural until the 19th century. In the municipality of Muttenz stood the Rothus (Red House), a farm with an inn mentioned from the 14th century, which after 1383 became the only Swiss house of the Pauline hermits; after the Reformation it was converted into a manor house.

In 1836 the Saxon Carl Christian Friedrich Glenck, a councillor of Oberberg, discovered a six-meter-thick layer of rock salt at Schweizerhalle. After the first salt works opened in 1837, chemical industries—especially dyes and fertilizers—established themselves there in the 19th and 20th centuries, owing to the salt available locally in abundance and the proximity of the Rhine, which served as a channel for wastewater. Salt baths were opened in 1850 and remained in operation until 1910.

The first chemical factory in the Basel region was built in 1845; it later became the Chemische Fabrik Schweizerhall, which passed to the German Brenntag group in 2005. The salt works, a private company, became AG Vereinigte Schweizer Rheinsalinen in 1909. After the opening of the acid factory, which brought together various industries in the sector (1918), these began to set up their own branches, still active in the early 21st century.

Connected to the railway network in 1872 by the salt train, Schweizerhalle developed its infrastructure—post office, inn, grocery, and school (1932–1971)—after the construction of a few small workers' housing estates.

On 1 November 1986, a Sandoz warehouse caught fire (the Sandoz chemical spill), and the firefighting water destroyed aquatic life as far as Mannheim.

The Glenck villa has housed a modern salt museum since 1997.

== Bibliography ==
- K. Birkhäuser et al., 150 Jahre Saline Schweizerhalle, 1837 bis 1987, 1987
- Heimatkunde Pratteln 2003, 2003
- Muttenz zu Beginn des neuen Jahrtausends, 2009
- B. Ruetz, A. Roos, Carl Christian Friedrich Glenck, 1779–1845, 2009
