= Wasabröd =

Swedish food company

AB Wasabröd
- Formerly: AB Skellefteå spisbrödsfabrik (1919-1934); AB Wasa spisbrödsfabrik (1934-1964)
- Founded: 1919; 107 years ago in Skellefteå, Sweden
- Founder: Karl Edvard Lundström
- Headquarters: Sweden
- Owners: Sandoz (1983-1999); Barilla Alimentare S.p.A. (from 1999)
- Website: wasa.com

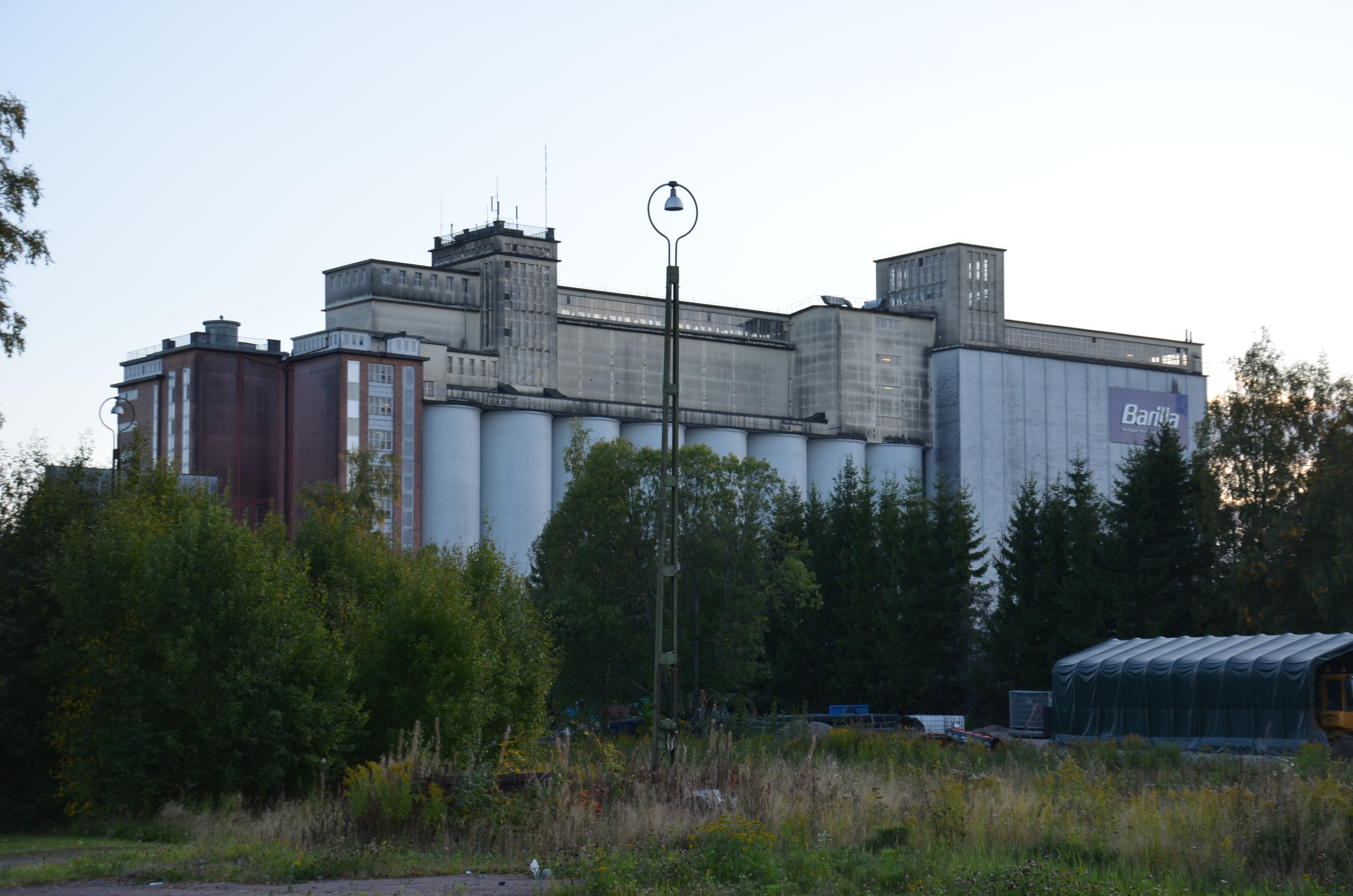
Wasabröd, Filipstad, Sweden

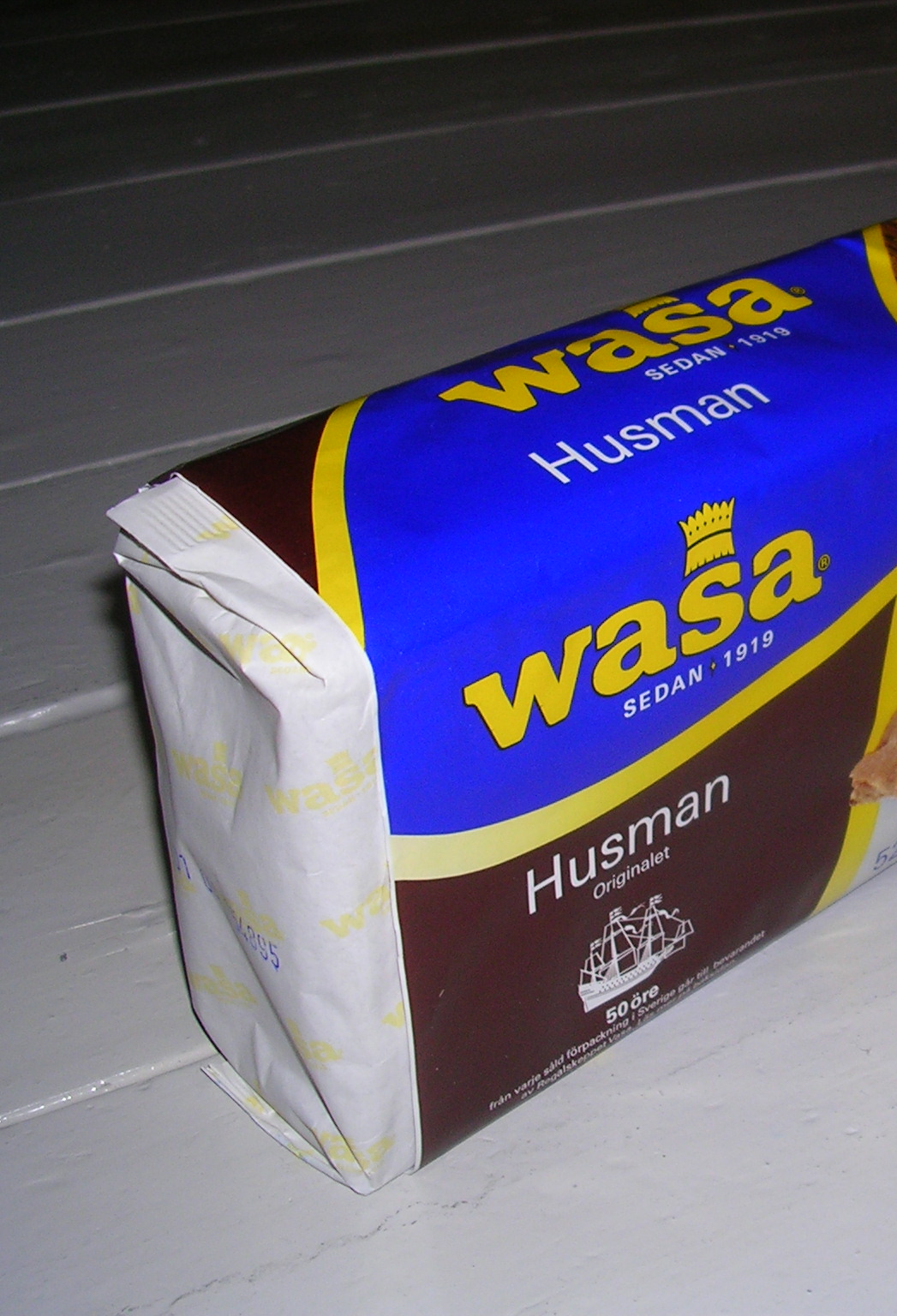
"Wasa Husman"

Wasabröd is a Swedish producer of Scandinavian style crispbread (Swedish: knäckebröd). The Wasabröd company has been in business since 1919, opening its first bakery in the city of Skellefteå. Since 1983 it has been under foreign ownership, first by the Swiss pharmaceutical corporation Sandoz (later merged with Ciba Geigy to become Novartis), and from 1999 by the Italian food producer Barilla Alimentare S.p.A.

== History ==
The first bakery in Skellefteå, founded by Karl Edvard Lundström, was supplemented by another, completely mechanized, one in Filipstad in 1931, which has since become the main seat of the corporation. It later acquired several other Swedish bakeries. It started exporting bread in the 1940s, with the first foreign subsidiary founded in Denmark in 1965 and the first foreign bakery built in Celle in Germany in 1967. In the early 21st century Wasabröd sells about 80% of its production outside Sweden.

K. E. Lundström, the founder of the company, had run his own bakery in Skellefteå since 1915 (Firma K. E. Lundström), with the corporation founded in 1919, AB Skellefteå spisbrödsfabrik, taking its original name from the hometown. The Filipstad subsidiary which developed into the main part of the company took the name AB Wasa spisbrödsfabrik in 1934, which was shortened to AB Wasabröd in 1964. The brand Wasa was originally that of one particular product, Vasaknäcke, featuring an image of King Gustavus Vasa. The company has used both a royal crown and the peculiar heraldic charge, the garb (Swedish: vase), which gave name to the Vasa dynasty, in its marketing. (Using the letter W instead of V is an archaism in Swedish; it is not uncommon in marketing, but does not affect the pronunciation.)

Barilla's bakery in Filipstad employs 310 people and produces 33,000 tonnes of crispbread annually. In 2009-2014, the owner invested 150 million kronor in the Filipstad factory to modernise the equipment.

== Products ==
Wasabröd produces a wide variety of crispbreads. The original crisp bread is made of rye, but their various products include sesame, wheat, and other grains.

== Royal warrant ==
The company has the status of a Purveyor to the Royal Court of Sweden.

== See also ==
- House of Vasa
- List of Swedish companies
- List of companies of Italy
