= Pastiglie Leone =

Italian candy manufacturer

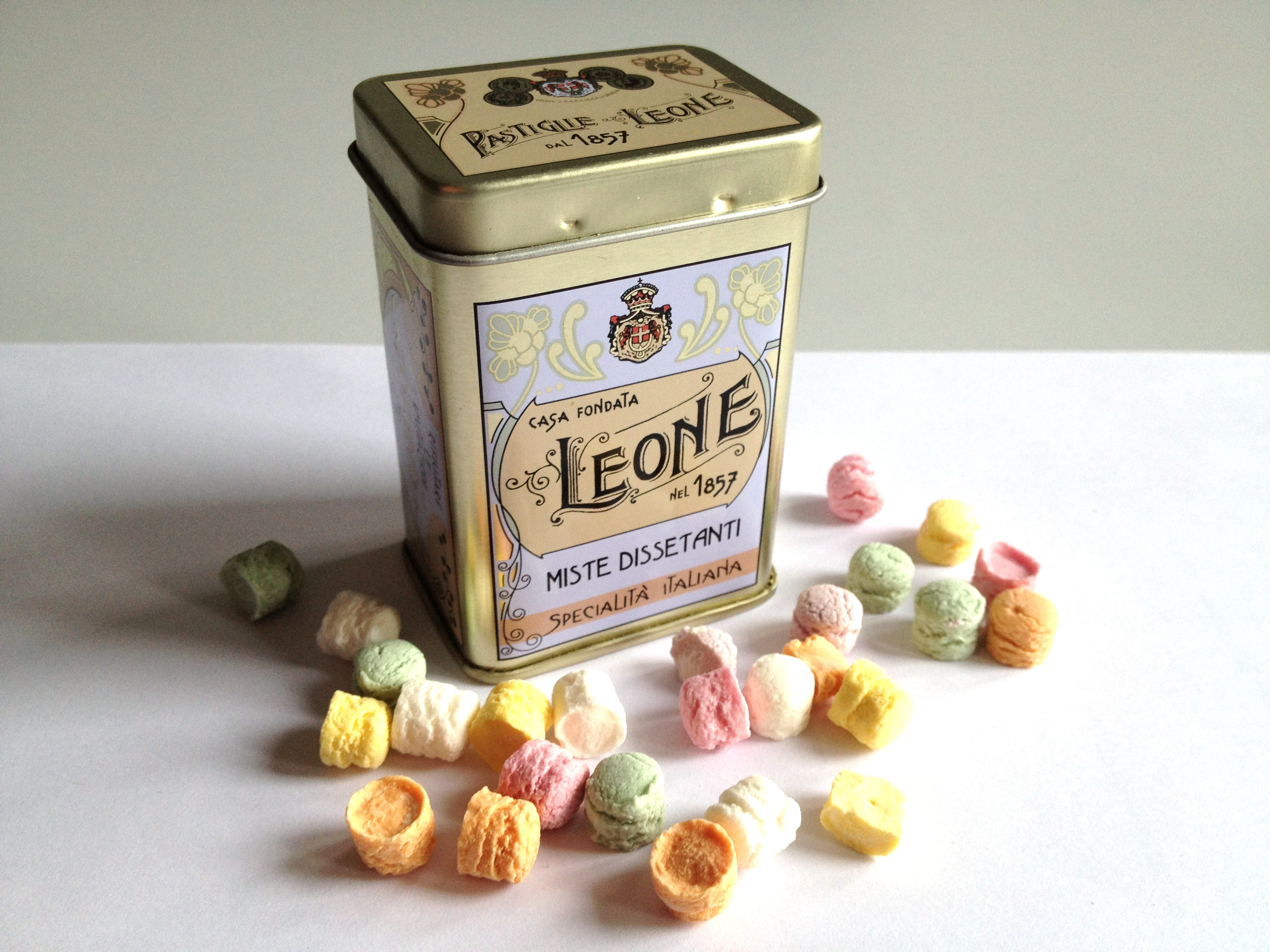
- Packaging of Leone candy
- Founded: 1857
- Founder: Luigi Leone
- Headquarters: Italy
- Website: www.pastiglieleone.it

Pastiglie Leone is an Italian candy manufacturer of candies, jellies, gummy sweets, liquorice, fine chocolate and sugar- and calorie-free pastilles. The candies are produced in a variety of flavors. The brand are famous for their Art Nouveau style tins.

== History ==
Pastiglie Leone was founded by Luigi Leone in 1857 in Neive, close to Alba before moving to Turin. The company also was an Italian Royal Warrant of Appointment holder.

In 1934 the company was taken over by Giselda Balla Monero and her brother Celso Balla, who moved the factories to Corso Regina Margherita in Turin. In the 80s, the company was inherited by Guido Monero, who, in 2006, moved the factory to its current location in Collegno.

In 2018, the brand was bought by Luca Barilla.

The brand is proud of its traditional roots, and their sweets are still made using the same traditional bronze moulds that have been used throughout their entire history of production.

== Tins ==
The brand are famous for their Art Nouveau style tins, which come in a variety of sizes. They launch special edition tins, collaborating with brands or artists, or to celebrate special events.

== Flavors ==
Many flavors are offered by Pastiglie Leone including: Absinthe, Alpine Herbs, Anise, Balsamic, Currant, Blueberry, Cedar Mint, Cedar Sage, Cinnamon, Cloves, Chamomile, Coffee, Fernet, Gentian, Green Tea, Lemon, Liquorice, Mint, Orange, Orange blossom, Polar Relief (Menthol and Eucalyptus), Propolis (Honey), Raspberry, Rhubarb, Spices, Strawberry, Tangerine, Vanilla, and Violet.

In addition to this, they have now branched out from their original offering of hard sweets to produce gummy sweets, chocolate, liquorice and calorie-free pastilles.
