= Crispbread =

Flat and dry type of bread

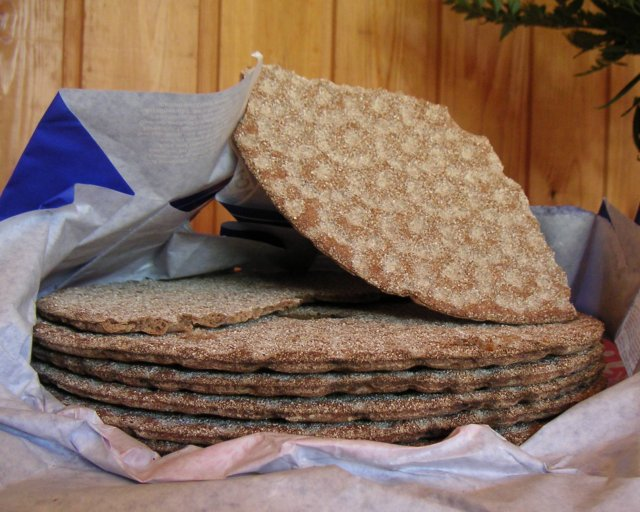
- Swedish crispbread
- Alternative names: Hard bread
- Type: Bread
- Place of origin: Sweden
- Region or state: Nordic countries
- Main ingredients: Rye flour, salt, water

Crispbread (Note: Swedish: knäckebröd (pronounced [ˈknɛ̂kːɛˌbrøːd], lit. 'crack bread'), hårt bröd/hårdbröd (lit. 'hard bread'), spisbröd (lit. 'stove bread') or knäcke; Danish: knækbrød; Norwegian: knekkebrød; Finnish: näkkileipä or näkkäri; Estonian: näkileib; Icelandic: hrökkbrauð; Faroese: knekkbreyð; German: Knäckebrot (pronounced [ˈknɛkəˌbʁoːt]) or Knäcke; Low German: Knackbrood.) is a flat and dry type of bread, containing mostly rye flour. Crispbreads are lightweight and keep fresh for a very long time due to their lack of water. Crispbread is a staple food and was for a long time considered a poor man's diet.

== Origins ==
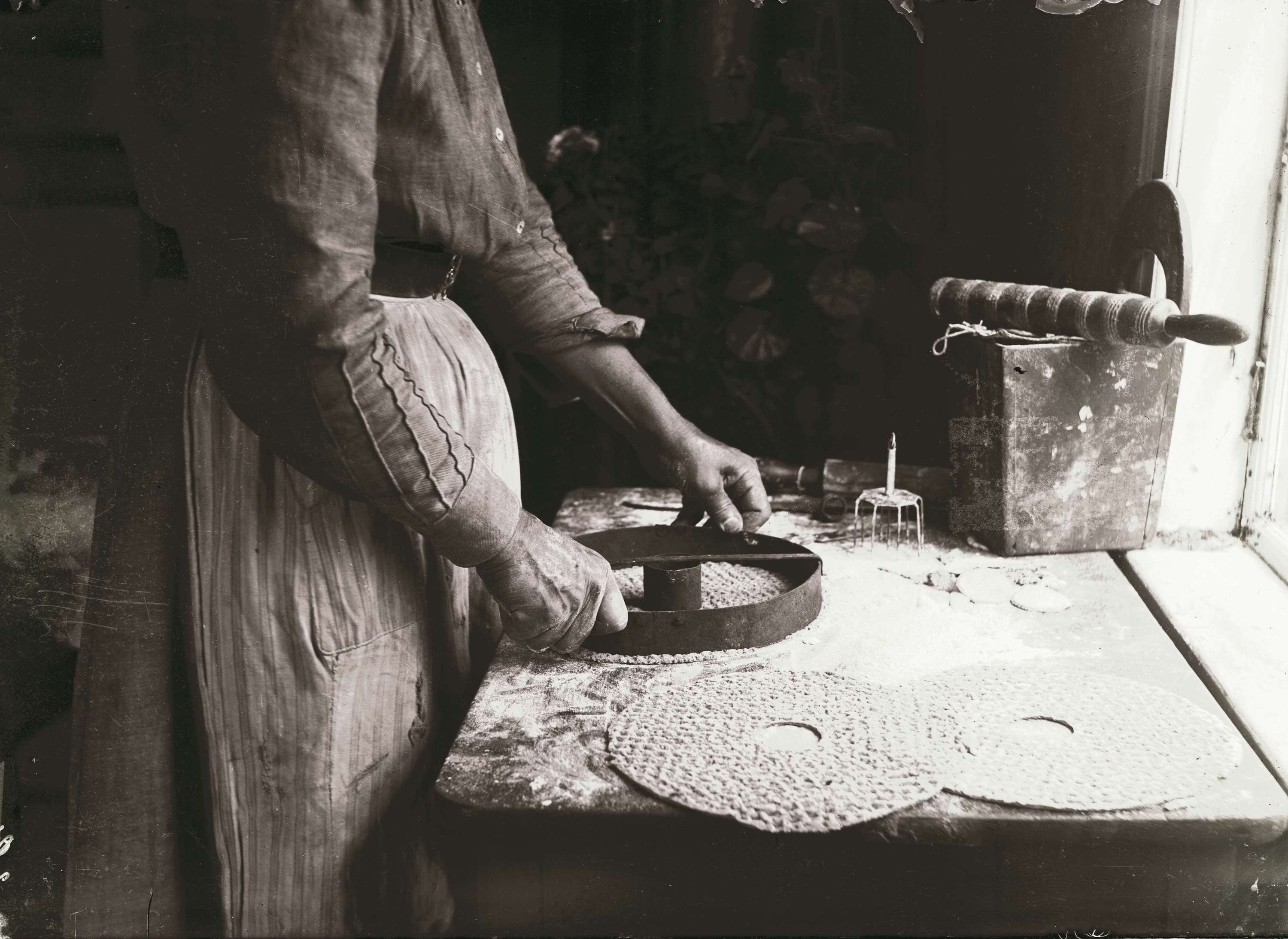
Crispbread baking in Värmland (1911)

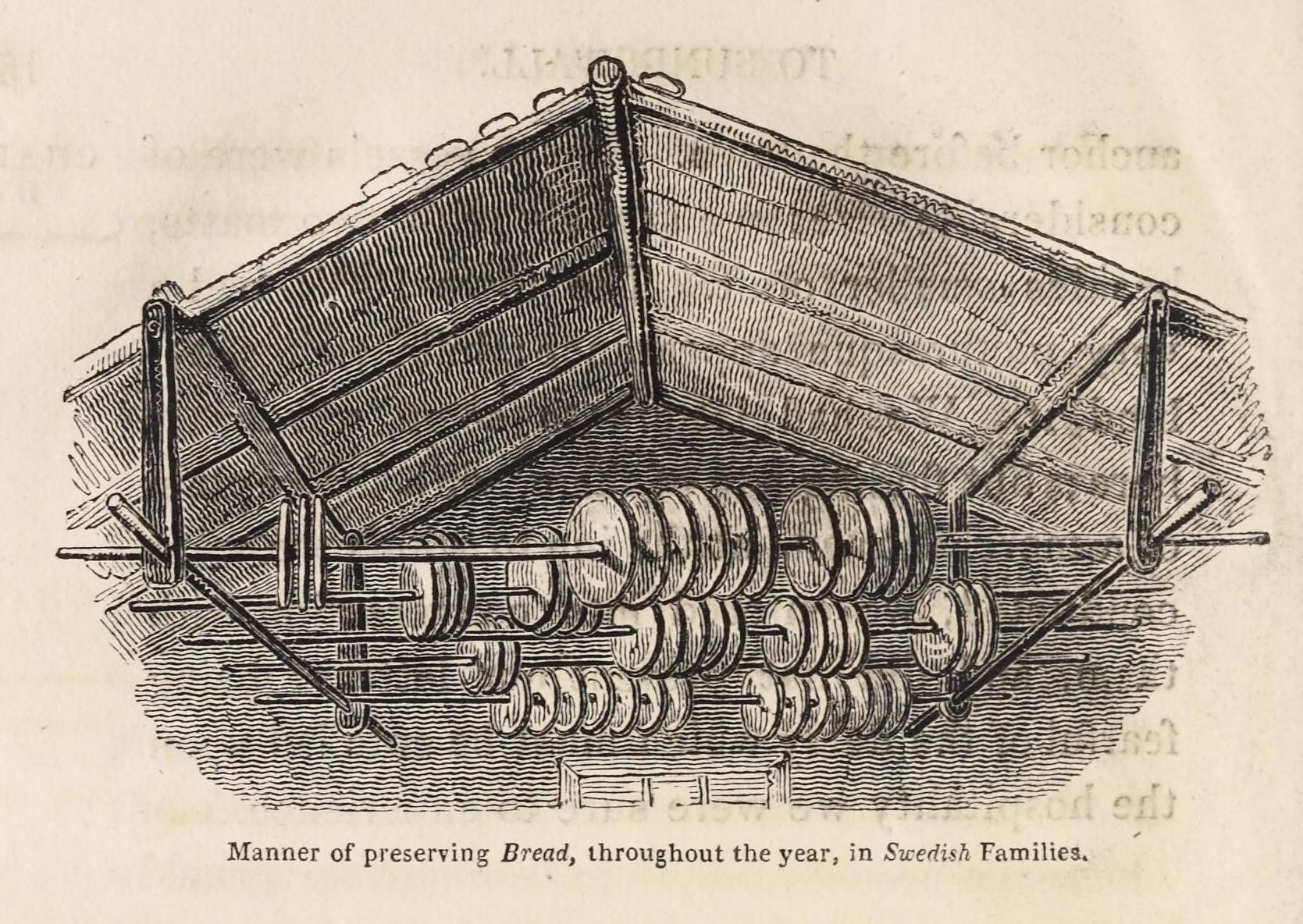
Crispbread was often stored on long poles hanging from the roof.

Sweden, Finland, and Norway have long traditions in crispbread consumption. The origin of the crispbread came from the earlier spisbröd 'stovebread' which was a similar but thicker kind of bread. The Swedish knäcka means 'to crack' or 'to break', however knäckebröd 'crispbread' originates from the old word kruseknäcke, referring to a specific tool that was used to roll the crispbread dough.

These breads were baked from at least the sixth century in central Sweden. They were usually hung above the stove to be dried. Traditional crispbread in Sweden and western Finland is made in this tradition with the form of a round flat loaf with a hole in the middle to facilitate storage on long poles hanging near the ceiling. It may also have been a way to keep the rats away from them. Traditionally, crispbreads were baked just twice a year: following harvest and again in the spring when frozen river waters began to flow. The slim crispbread that is common today originated in eastern Värmland. Sweden's first industrial crispbread bakery, AU Bergmans enka, began its production in Stockholm in 1850. Rectangular Knäckebrot was first manufactured in Germany in 1927, and has remained popular and readily available there ever since.

Crispbread in the household is most common in Sweden; as of 2003, in Sweden 85 percent of households had crispbread at home, while in Germany it was 45 percent and in France 8 percent.

== Ingredients ==
Crispbread traditionally consists of wholemeal rye flour, salt, and water. Today, however, many kinds of crispbread contain wheat flour, spices and grains, and are often leavened with yeast or sourdough, and milk or sesame seeds can be added.

In the case of unleavened crispbread, bubbles are introduced into the dough mechanically. Traditionally, this was done by mixing snow or powdered ice into the dough, which then evaporated during baking. Today, the dough, which must contain a large amount of water, is cooled and mixed until bubbly.

Another method is to knead the dough under pressure in an extruder. The sudden drop in pressure then causes water to evaporate, creating bubbles in the dough.

Crispbread is only baked for a few minutes, at temperatures usually between 200 and 250 °C (392 and 482 °F).

== Serving ==
Crispbread itself is very dry and therefore served with a spread, like butter, and optional toppings. Crispbread is usually a part of a daily meal. In Sweden and Finland crispbread and butter or margarine are included in school meals. Crispbread might also be crushed into yogurt or filmjölk in place of cereals or muesli, and even used as a pizza base. In Sweden, crispbread is a common side dish for pea soup, as well as for pickled herring.

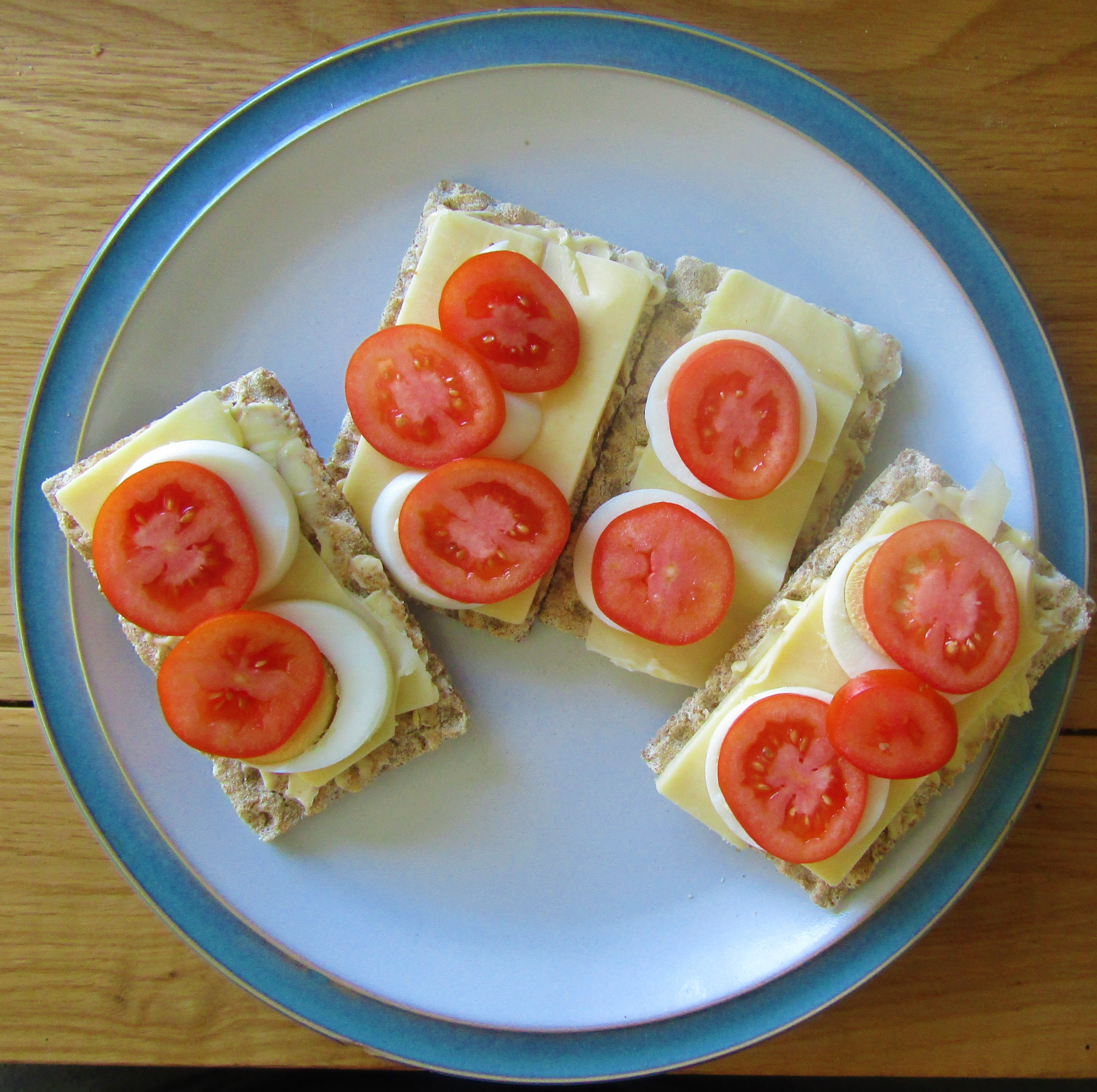
Crispbread in England with butter, cheese, egg and tomato

== Gallery ==
Different types and shapes of commercial crispbread:

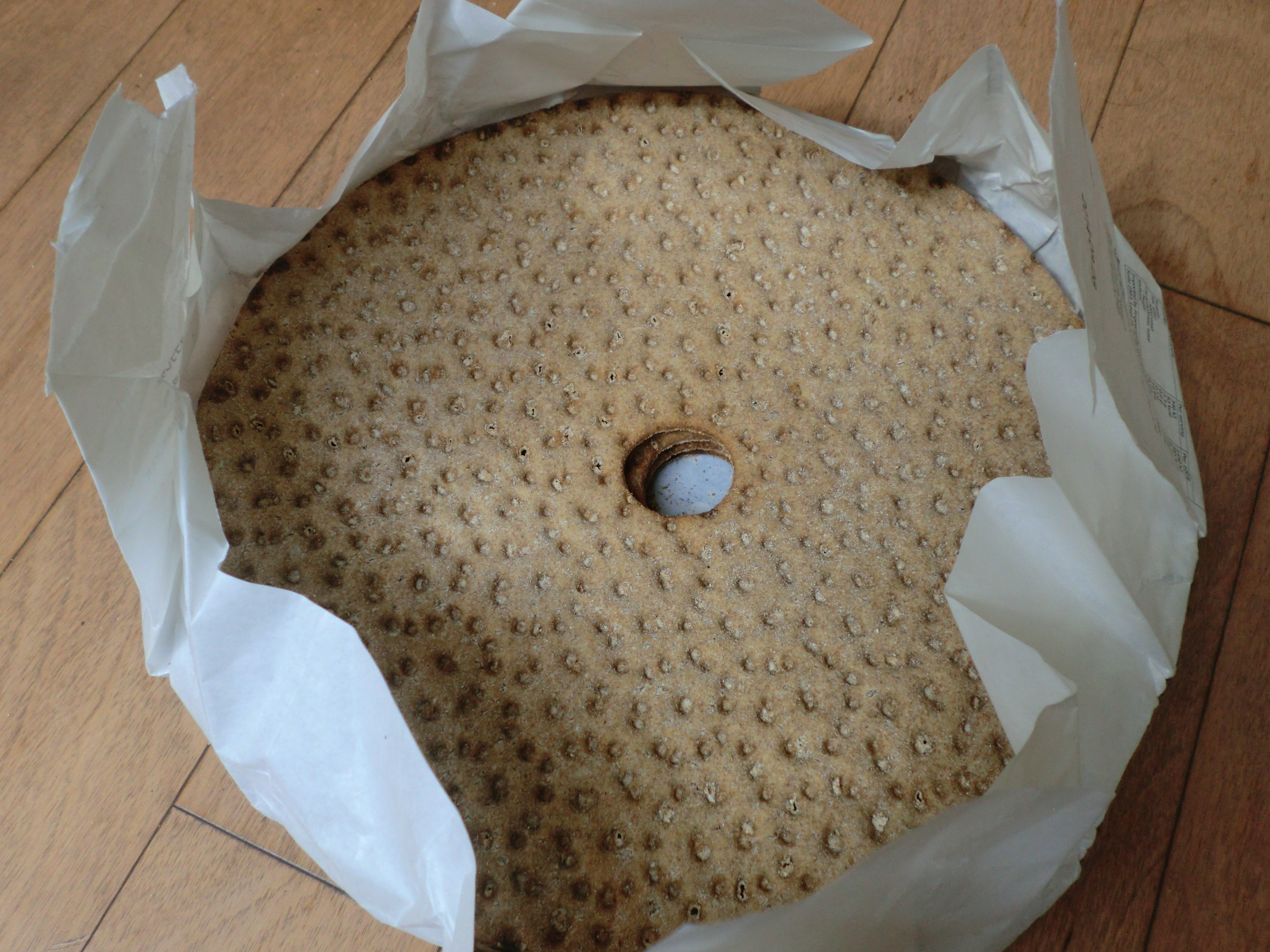

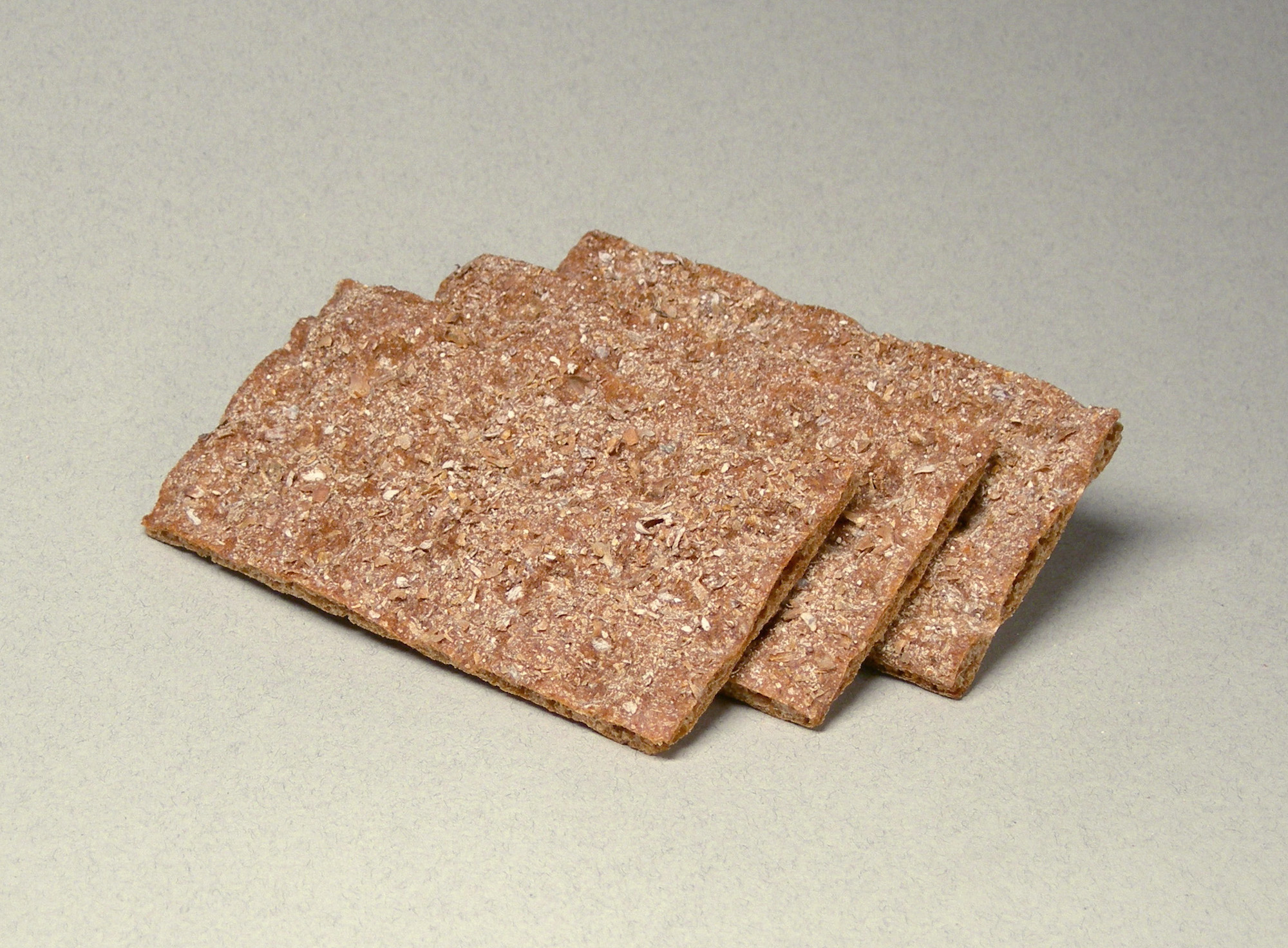

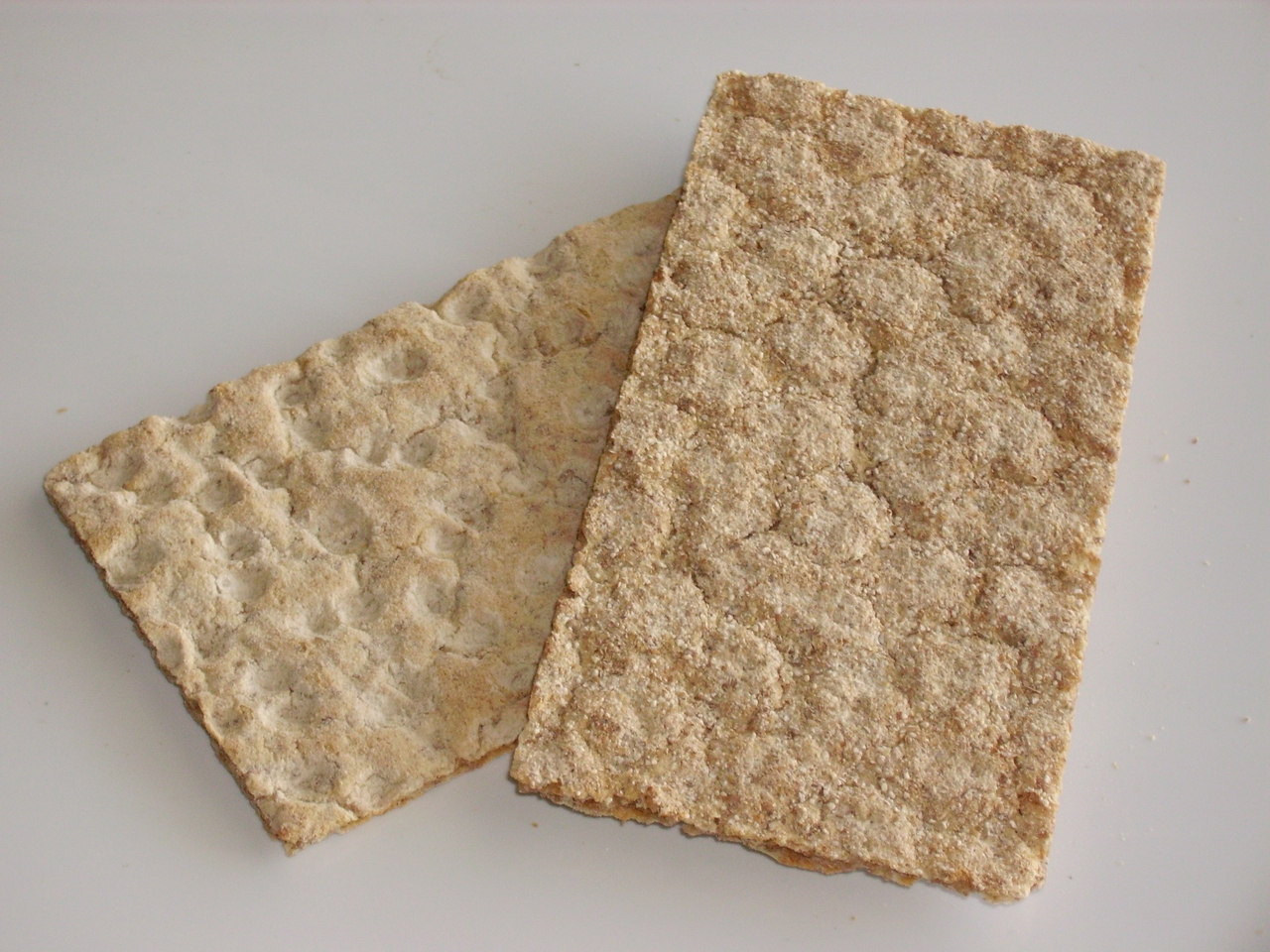

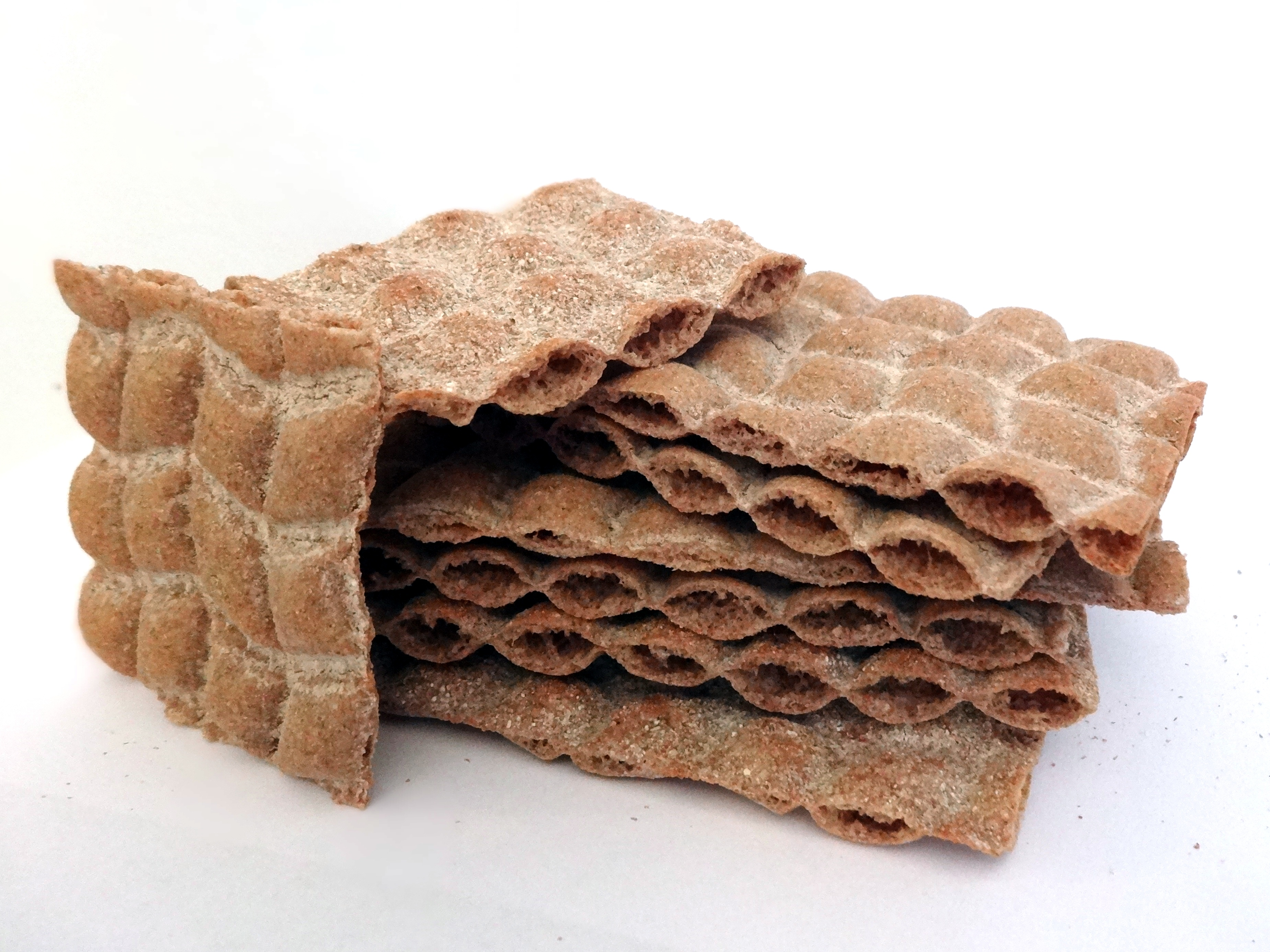

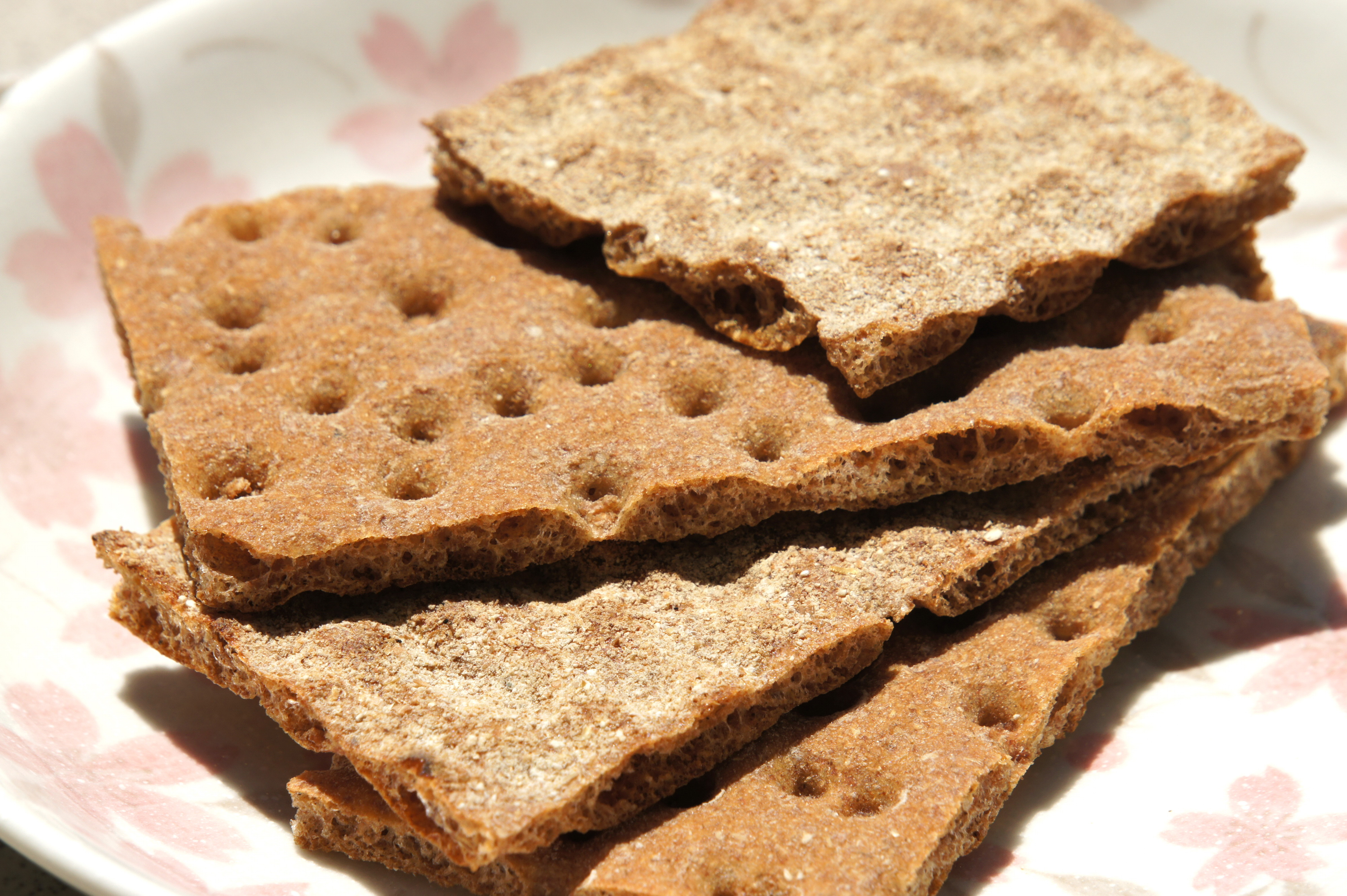

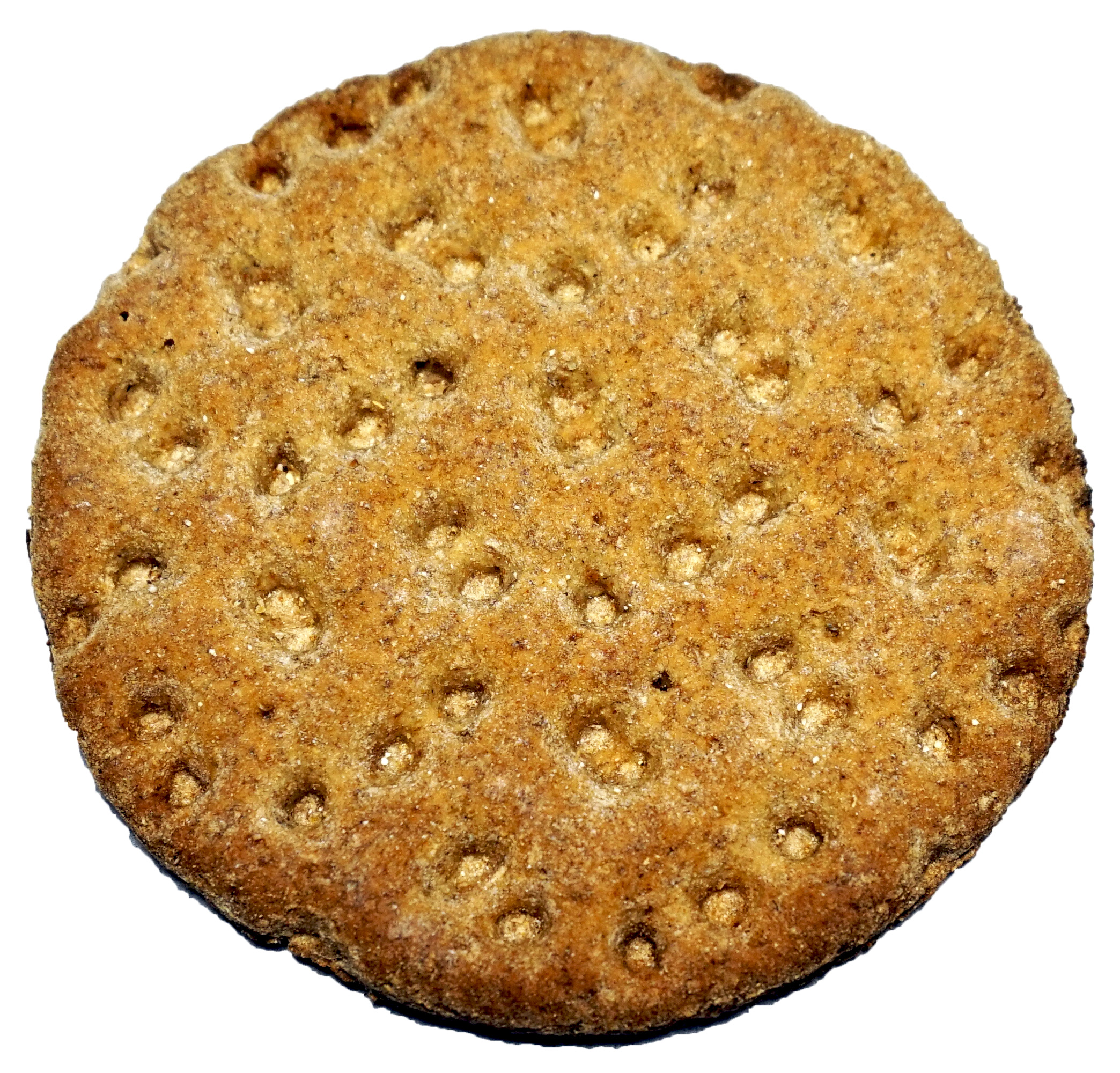

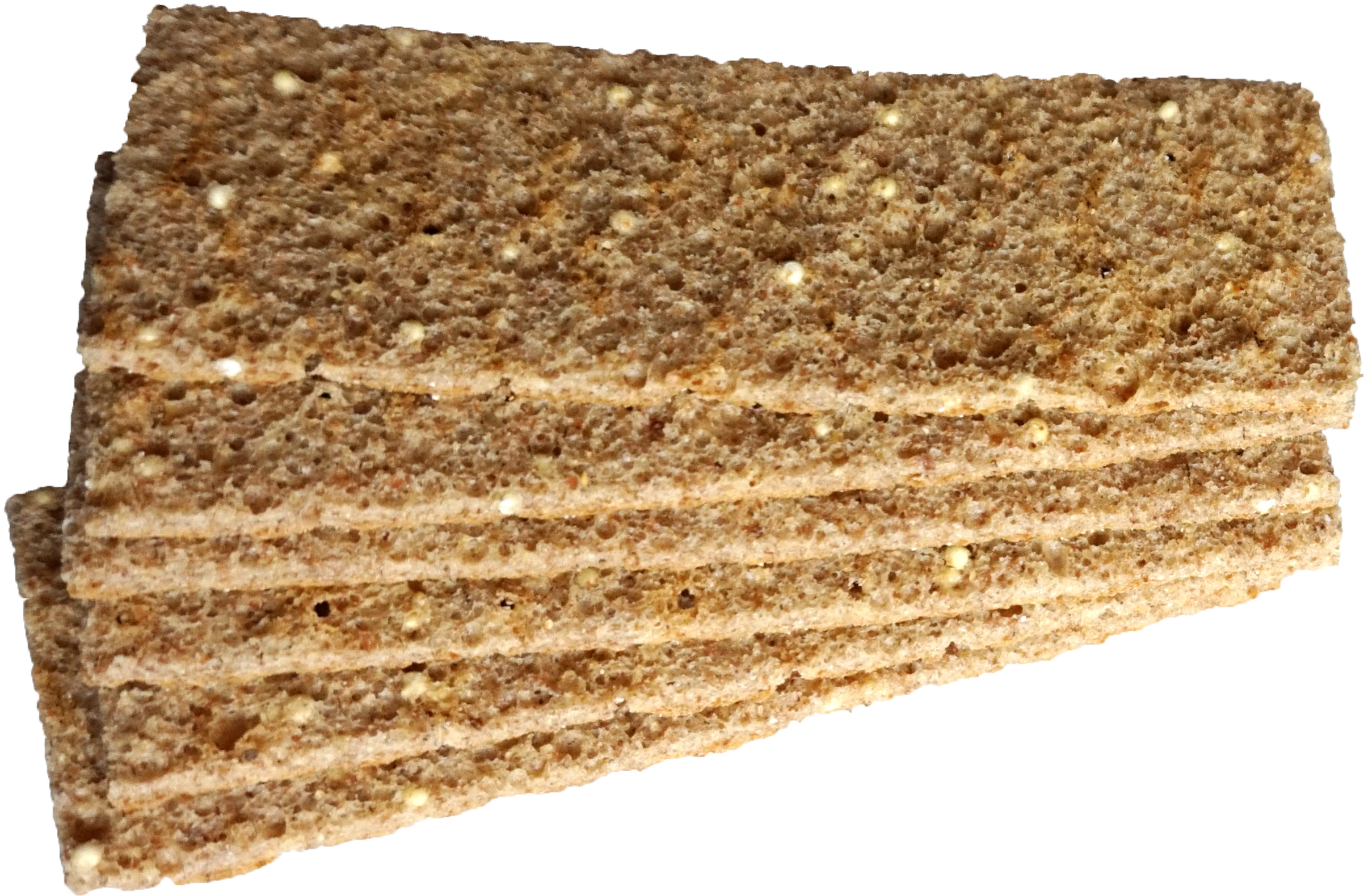

== See also ==
- Bublik
- Dorset knob
- Flatbread
- Flatbrød
- Hardtack
- Khakhra
- Lavash
- Matzo
- Ryvita, a brand of crispbread
- Tunnbröd
- Wasabröd, a Swedish company
