= Chemische Fabrik Uetikon =

Swiss chemical company

CU Chemie Uetikon AG
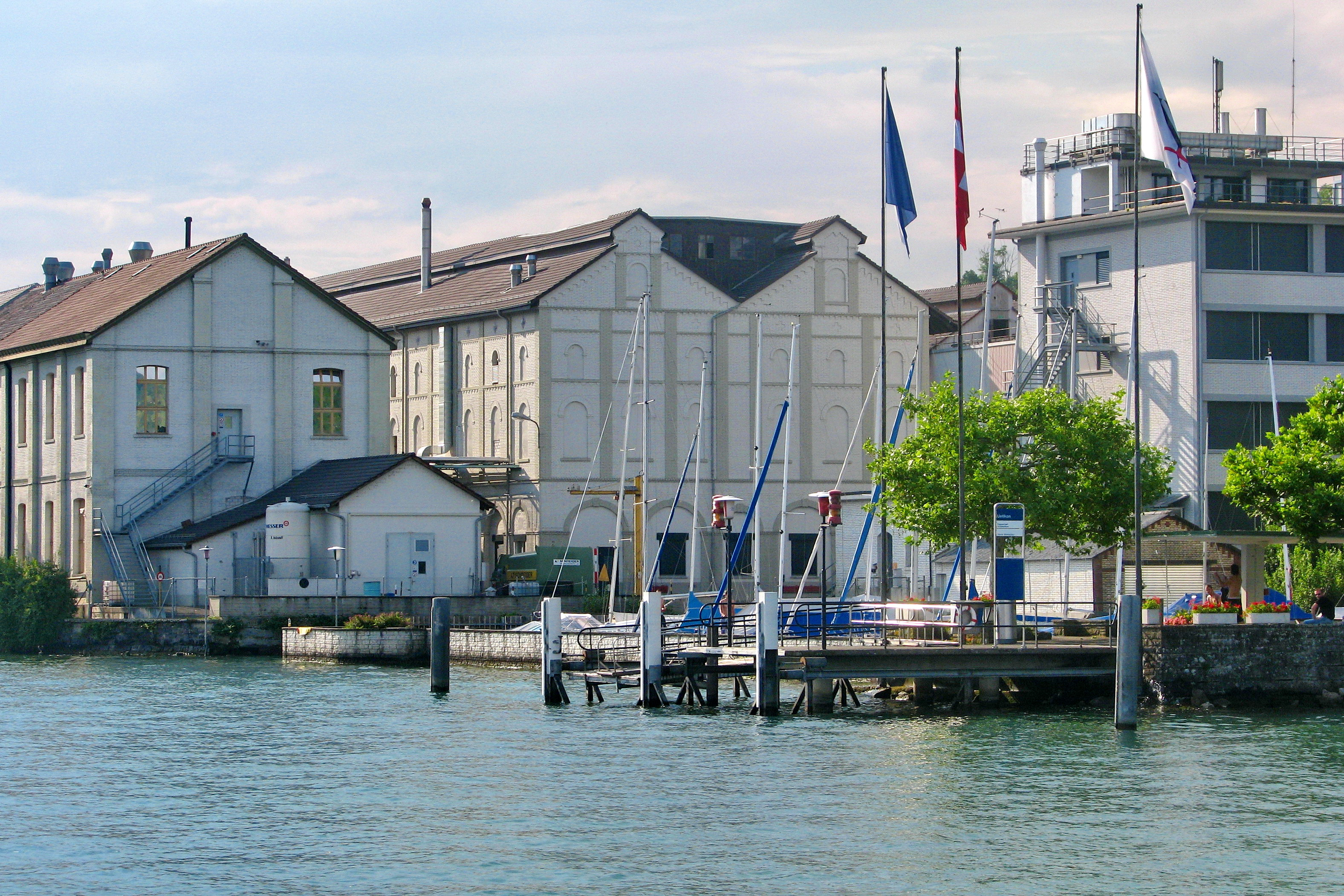
- View of the company premises from Lake Zurich
- Formerly: Chemische Fabrik Uetikon
- Type: Joint-stock company
- Industry: Chemicals
- Founded: 1818 in Uetikon am See, Switzerland
- Founder: Heinrich, Rudolf, Kaspar and Elisabeth Schnorf
- Headquarters: Uetikon am See, Switzerland
- Products: Base chemicals, agrochemicals, fine chemicals, water treatment
- Number of employees: 408 including subsidiaries (1999)

The Chemische Fabrik Uetikon was a medium-sized Swiss chemical company based in Uetikon am See, specializing in base chemicals, agrochemicals, fine chemicals, and water treatment.

== History ==
The company was founded in 1818 by the siblings Heinrich, Rudolf, Kaspar, and Elisabeth Schnorf as a producer of sulfuric acid and sulfates. Rudolf became its sole owner in 1838, and his son Rudolf moved into industrial production around 1850. The increase in turnover during the Franco-Prussian War allowed for various innovations, such as obtaining sulfuric acid from inexpensive pyrites. In 1881 the company acquired shares in the Perlen paper mill near Lucerne, and in 1899 it was converted into a joint-stock company.

In the 1960s the firm became the largest producer of sulfuric acid in Switzerland, with 80,000 tonnes per year. The CPH Chemie und Papier Holding AG was founded in Lucerne in 1971. By 1990 the Chemische Fabrik Uetikon, restructured as CU Chemie Uetikon AG, had consolidated turnover of over 100 million francs. In 1999, including subsidiaries, turnover was about 169.6 million francs, and the company employed 408 people, around 190 of them at the parent company.

== Bibliography ==
- U. Geilinger-Schnorf, 175 Jahre Chemie Uetikon, 1993
