= Durand & Huguenin =

Swiss chemical company

- Company type: Joint-stock company
- Industry: Chemicals
- Founded: 1860 in Basel, Switzerland
- Founder: Gaspard Dollfus
- Fate: Merged into Sandoz (1969)
- Headquarters: Basel, Switzerland
- Products: Dyes for printed cottons
- Number of employees: 582 (1968)

Durand & Huguenin was a Swiss chemical company based in Basel that specialized in dyes for printed cottons.

== History ==
In 1871 Louis Durand took over a chemical-products factory founded in 1860 by Gaspard Dollfus, next to the Basel gasworks on the left bank of the Rhine. In 1872 his brother-in-law Daniel Edouard Huguenin took a stake in the company, which specialized in dyes for printed cottons. It became a joint-stock company in 1900 after the withdrawal of the two promoters, and gave up the foreign expansion it had begun in the 1880s (Saint-Fons near Lyon, Huningue, and New Jersey). When the Huningue plant became an independent French joint-stock company in 1920, only the Basel parent company remained.

In 1922 the capital had to be halved, and the help of the German company Bayer and the French company Kuhlmann was sought to restore the situation. The majority of the shares belonged to the German company IG Farben, then was taken over by the Basler IG (Ciba, Geigy, and Sandoz) in 1940. The new owners did not want to develop a competing enterprise, so it remained essentially limited to dyes and stayed small (582 employees in 1968). In 1969 poor results led the company to merge into its close neighbor Sandoz.

== Bibliography ==
=== Archives ===
- Novartis Archives, Basel
- Firmenakten, Schweizerisches Wirtschaftsarchiv (SWA)
