= Acino International =

Swiss pharmaceutical company

Acino International AG
- Formerly: Chemische Fabrik Schweizerhall; Schweizerhall Holding; Acino Holding AG
- Company type: Private
- ISIN: CH0021190902
- Industry: Pharmaceuticals
- Founded: 1890 (as Chemische Fabrik Schweizerhall); origins from 1836
- Headquarters: Zürich, Switzerland
- Area served: Middle East, Africa, Ukraine and Eurasia, Latin America
- Products: Generic and prescription pharmaceuticals, drug delivery systems
- Owner: ADQ (via Arcera)
- Website: acino.swiss

Acino International is a Swiss pharmaceutical company headquartered in Zürich that develops and manufactures generic and prescription medicines, with a focus on novel drug delivery forms and on emerging markets.

== History ==
After Carl Christian Friedrich Glenck founded the Schweizerhalle salt works in 1837, he ceded the right to manufacture chemical products from salt to Stephan Gutzwiller in 1843. The factory built up from 1845 by Gutzwiller and his brother passed through several owners before being taken over in 1860 by Carl Glenck, grandson of the salt works' founder. In 1890 he was among the founders of the joint-stock company Chemische Fabrik Schweizerhall in Basel. A first branch was established at Saint-Louis in 1892, superphosphate production began at Schweizerhalle in 1895, and a factory was built in Basel in 1897.

Alongside the manufacture of chemical products for industry and agriculture, the firm specialized in the wholesale trade in chemicals, animal feed, and liquid fuels. It took up pharmaceutical manufacturing in 1941 and, in the 1950s, trade in plastics. In 1987 the company was converted into Schweizerhall holding . It went public on the Swiss stock exchange in 1994.

By the early 21st century the company had refocused on the pharmaceutical generics business. After acquiring Cimex Pharma of Liesberg in 2004 and Novosis of Miesbach, Germany, in 2006, and selling its chemicals-distribution business, it became a company focused on pharmaceuticals and generics. In 2008 the group and its subsidiaries were renamed Acino, a name blending Cimex and Novosis.

In December 2013 Acino was taken private by the investment firms Avista Capital Partners and Nordic Capital, in a deal valuing the company at about 398 million Swiss francs, after which it was delisted from the SIX Swiss Exchange. In 2021 Acino was acquired by ADQ, an Abu Dhabi–based investment and holding company, and was later organized as part of Arcera, a life-sciences group established by ADQ.

== Bibliography ==
- B. Ruetz, "Carl Christian Friedrich Glenck 1779–1845", in Schweizer Pioniere der Wirtschaft und Technik 90, 2009
