= Sandoz =

Swiss pharmaceuticals and biosimilars company

Sandoz Group AG
- Formerly: Sandoz GmbH
- Type: Public (Aktiengesellschaft)
- Traded as: SIX: SDZ; SMI MID component
- ISIN: CH1243598427
- Industry: Biosimilars; Generics; Biopharmaceuticals
- Predecessor: Ciba-Geigy
- Founded: 1886; 140 years ago
- Founder: Alfred Kern; Edouard Sandoz
- Headquarters: Basel, Switzerland
- Key people: Richard Saynor (CEO) Francisco Ballester (President International) Gilbert Ghostine (Chairman)
- Revenue: ▲US$9.647 billion (2023)
- Operating income: ▼US$375 million (2023)
- Net income: ▲US$953 million (2023)
- Total assets: ▼US$19.430 billion (2023)
- Total equity: ▼US$8.654 billion (2023)
- Number of employees: 23,848 (2023)
- Website: sandoz.com

Sandoz Group AG is a Swiss company that focuses on generic pharmaceuticals and biosimilars. Prior to October 2023, it was part of a division of Novartis that was established in 2003, when Novartis united all of its generics businesses under the name Sandoz. Before this, the company existed as an independent pharmaceutical manufacturer until 1996, when it was merged with Ciba-Geigy to form Novartis. Prior to the merger, it specialized in medicines used in organ transplants, such as Sandimmune, and various antipsychotics and migraine medicines. Its headquarters were in Holzkirchen, Germany and after the spin-off from Novartis, the headquarters moved to Basel, Switzerland, with most of global functions operating from Holzkirchen in Germany, Prague in Czechia, and Barcelona in Spain. Sandoz is the global leader in generic pharmaceuticals and biosimilars.

== History ==
=== 1886–1995: Formation and initial growth ===
The company was founded in 1886 by Alfred Kern (1850–1893) and Edouard Sandoz (1853–1928) in Basel (Switzerland) under the name Chemiefirma Kern und Sandoz. Initially the company focused on production of dyes namely alizarin blue and auramine. When Kern died, the company changed its name to Chemische Fabrik vormals Sandoz in 1895 and began producing pharmaceuticals for the first time the same year. As early as 1895, the first pharmaceutical substance called antipyrine was produced to reduce fever. In 1899 they started producing saccharin.

In 1917, Sandoz entered pharmaceutical research when Arthur Stoll (1887–1971) was hired, and, in 1929, Calcium Sandoz was introduced, laying the foundation research into modern calcium therapy.

In 1918, Arthur Stoll isolated ergotamine from ergot; the substance was eventually used to treat migraine and headaches and was introduced under the trade name Gynergen in 1921.

In 1938 Albert Hofmann produced the synthetic substance lysergic acid diethylamide, better known as LSD. The psychoactive properties of this preparation were nevertheless not discovered until 1943, when Hofmann ingested a small amount by accident. From 1947 to the mid-60s, LSD was sold by Sandoz under the name Delysid. It was marketed as a treatment for a wide variety of mental ailments, ranging from alcoholism to sexual deviancy. Sandoz suggested in its marketing literature that psychiatrists take LSD themselves, to gain a better subjective understanding of the schizophrenic experience, and many did exactly that and so did other scientific researchers. The Sandoz product received mass publicity as early as 1954, in a Time magazine feature. Research on LSD peaked in the 1950s and early 1960s. The CIA purchased quantities of LSD from Sandoz for use in its illegal human experimentation program known as MKUltra. Sandoz withdrew the drug from the market in 1965. The drug became a cultural novelty of the 1960s after psychologist Timothy Leary at Harvard University began to promote its use for recreational and spiritual experiences among the general public.

In 1939, Kern & Sandoz became Sandoz Ltd., a name it operated under for nearly sixty years.

In 1963, Sandoz acquired Biochemie GmbH, which was producing and supplying scarce, urgently needed acid-resistant penicillin.

In 1967, Sandoz merged with Wander AG and diversified into the dietetics business with Ovomaltine and Isostar.

In 1969, Sandoz acquired Durand & Huguenin, a Swiss chemical company that specialized in dyes for printed cottons.

In 1972, Sandoz acquired Delmark, Wasabröd, Wasa, the Swedish crisp bread producer Wasa in 1982.

In 1986, Velsicol Chemical Corporation acquired the agrochemicals division of Sandoz.

In 1994, Sandoz bought Gerber Products Company, expanding its research into biopharmacueticals.

In 1995, the specialty chemicals division became an independent company under the name Clariant, based in Muttenz.

=== 1996–2023: Merger with Ciba-Geigy and developments under Novartis ===
On December 20, 1996, the merger of Sandoz and Ciba-Geigy led to the creation of Novartis. The Sandoz brand name was then only used in the pharmaceutical business for over-the-counter medicines.

The former company name Sandoz was reactivated in May 2003 with the merger of the globally differently named generics companies of the parent company Novartis under the uniform brand name Sandoz. In addition to the name, the company logo used before the merger was also adopted.

In 2002, Sandoz acquired Lek Pharmaceuticals d.d., Slovenia's largest pharmaceutical company.

In 2003, Novartis united its global generics businesses under a single global brand, reestablishing the name Sandoz as a division of Novartis. The Amifarma S.L. production plant in Palafolls, located near Barcelona, Spain was also acquired.

In February 2005, Sandoz acquired over Hexal AG and Eon Labs. The integration into Sandoz created the second largest generics group in the world and the largest on the German market with annual sales of 7.6 billion US dollars (2008) and over 23,000 employees in 130 countries. The headquarters have been in Holzkirchen since 2005. Sandoz's Swiss administrative headquarters are in Rotkreuz ZG in the municipality of Risch in the canton of Zug.

In 2006, Omnitrope, a recombinant human growth hormone, was approved by the European Medicines Agency (EMA) and also became the first biosimilar to receive approval from the FDA.

In 2007, the first complex biosimilar, Binocrit was approved in the EU.

In 2009, Sandoz acquired EBEWE Pharma's specialty generic injectables division and in 2010, acquired Oriel Therapeutics.

In 2012, Sandoz acquired Fougera Pharmaceuticals, entering the generic (topical) dermatology business.

In November 2018, it was announced that Novartis would convert Sandoz into an independent entity over the next two years. In March 2019, it was announced that CEO Richard Francis had resigned for personal reasons and that Francesco Balestrieri, Sandoz's European head, had taken over management ad interim. Richard Saynor was appointed as CEO later in 2019.

In August 2022, Novartis said the spin-off of Sandoz into a standalone company would be completed by the end of 2023. As part of the spin-off, Sandoz announced in June 2023 it would move its headquarters from Holzkirchen, Germany to Basel, Switzerland.

In July 2023, Sandoz launched a biosimilar version of AbbVie Inc's Humira, under the label, Hyrimoz.

=== 2023–present: Return to a standalone company ===
In September 2023, Novartis announced that the spin-off had been approved by its shareholders and that it would be completed by the next month, resulting in Novartis shareholders receiving one Sandoz share for every five Novartis shares. Sandoz was listed on the SIX Swiss Exchange with a market capitalization between $18 billion and $25bn.

On October 4, 2023, Novartis completed the spin-off of Sandoz as a stand-alone company.

The B2B business unit of Sandoz, dedicated to supplying active pharmaceutical ingredients (APIs), out-licensing of Finished Dosage Forms (FDFs), and Contract Manufacturing Organization (CMO) services, continues to operate from its global headquarters in Kufstein, Austria, which was inaugurated in June 2023. The unit supplies over 200 customers in 77 countries and delivers around 800 million treatments per year.

In January 2024, Sandoz announced it would acquire biosimilar drug for vision Cimerli For $170 million from Coherus BioSciences. The acquisition was completed in March 2024.

In February 2024, Sandoz US and its subsidiary Fougera Pharmaceuticals Inc. - indirect subsidiaries of Sandoz Group AG reached a US$265 million settlement agreement in the US related to a generics direct purchaser class action lawsuit.

In April 2024, Sandoz reached an agreement with Amgen to resolve all patent disputes between the two companies relating to the US Food and Drug Administration (FDA)-approved Sandoz denosumab biosimilars.

In November 2024, Sandoz inaugurated the new headquarters in Basel, Switzerland.

In November 2025, Sandoz announced that it had entered into a strategic agreement with Evotec to acquire Just-Evotec Biologics (JEB), including its biologics manufacturing facility in Toulouse, France.

Sandoz has been a component of the Swiss Market Index since September 2026.

== 1986 Sandoz warehouse fire in Schweizerhalle ==
On November 1, 1986, a major fire broke out in a warehouse containing 1,350 tonnes (2,980,000 lb) of chemicals in what was then Sandoz in Schweizerhalle. The thick smoke, the stench and the unknown composition of the combustion gases caused the authorities in the neighboring communities to alert the population early in the morning with a general siren alarm and a curfew of several hours was imposed. No people suffered acute harm, with the exception of three people with pre-existing asthma who required hospitalization. However, the toxins found their way into the Rhine via the extinguishing water, where they caused a large number of fish to die off.

On November 11, 1986, the analysis of water samples proved that at the same time as the Rhine was being polluted by the contaminated extinguishing water from the Sandoz area, 400 kg of atrazine, a herbicide, had been discharged into the Rhine from the neighboring chemical company Ciba-Geigy.

The official investigation report came to the conclusion (only "on the basis of theoretical considerations") that when pallets were packed with Prussian blue, incorrect handling of a hot air blower led to a hot spot, which could be the cause. Subsequent trials, however, resulted in no conviction. The plant now belongs to Clariant.

To this day, the landfill left after the fire continues to pollute the groundwater in Muttenz and is actively monitored by Novartis, as the legal successor to Sandoz, and the environmental authorities of the Canton of Basel-Landschaft.

To commemorate the spill, there is a plastic market table by Bettina Eichin in the cloister of Basel Munster.

== Literature ==
- Ernst Brandl: Zur Entdeckungsgeschichte des Penicillin V in Kundl (Tirol). In: Veröffentlichungen des Tiroler Landesmuseums Ferdinandeum. Band 71, Innsbruck 1991, S. 5–16 (Geschichte der Bio Chemie in Kundl, zobodat.at).

== See also ==
- Pharmaceutical industry in Switzerland
- List of psychedelic pharmaceutical companies
