= Simone Bellotti =

Italian fashion designer (born 1978)

- Born: 1978 (age 47–48); Giussano, Italy
- Education: Istituto Secoli
- Label: Jil Sander

Simone Bellotti (born 1978) is an Italian fashion designer who has been the creative director of Jil Sander since March 2025. He spent nearly 16 years at Gucci before joining the Swiss house Bally in 2022, where he was named design director in 2023 and presented four runway seasons.

== Early life and education ==
Bellotti was born in 1978 in Giussano, a furniture-producing town about 20 miles north of Milan. His father, Romano, was an upholsterer, and his mother, Bruna, assisted him and looked after Bellotti and his two sisters. His father died unexpectedly when Bellotti was 13.

At 18, Bellotti began studying fashion design and patternmaking at Milan's Istituto Secoli. While many of his classmates sought internships at large houses after graduating, he was drawn to independent designers working in Antwerp, such as Martin Margiela and Véronique Branquinho, and in 2001 he apprenticed for eight months at the Belgian label A.F. Vandevorst.

== Career ==
=== Early career ===
Back in Milan, Bellotti worked for the Austrian avant-garde designer Carol Christian Poell and then for Gianfranco Ferré, where he designed menswear. He went on to hold senior design positions at Bottega Veneta and Dolce & Gabbana. In 2007 he joined Gucci, relocating first to Florence and later to Rome, and stayed for nearly 16 years, working in the design studio under Frida Giannini and then Alessandro Michele.

=== Bally ===
In October 2022, Bellotti joined the design team of the Swiss luxury brand Bally, then under creative director Rhuigi Villaseñor, in a hiring the brand did not publicize at the time. When Villaseñor exited after just over a year, Bally named Bellotti design director in May 2023. He made his runway debut for the brand that September during Milan Fashion Week, presenting the spring 2024 collection in the portico of the San Simpliciano cloisters; the collection mined the company archives and the story of Monte Verità, an early-20th-century utopian community in Ascona. Vogue's Tiziana Cardini judged it a promising first outing.

Later Bally collections drew on Swiss folklore and art. The fall 2024 collection referenced an Engadin folk legend about a lake mermaid, while tiny cowbells nodded to the brand's Swiss heritage, and the spring 2025 collection took inspiration from Hugo Ball, a founder of Dada and of Cabaret Voltaire in Zurich. Reviewing the fall 2025 show, staged in Milan's Torre Velasca skyscraper, Samuel Hine of GQ described editors leaving the venue to shop at the Bally store and called Bellotti's designs "off-kilter in all the right ways"; the brand's Plume loafer, introduced under Bellotti, was visible on front-row editors throughout that fashion week.

=== Jil Sander ===
On March 10, 2025, OTB Group announced Bellotti as the new creative director of Jil Sander, effective immediately; he succeeded Luke and Lucie Meier, whose seven-year tenure had ended the previous month. OTB chairman Renzo Rosso said Bellotti brought "extensive experience and a distinct talent" to the role.

Rather than open his tenure with a collection, Bellotti first released a music project: a video shot in Hamburg, the city where Jil Sander founded the label in 1968, scored with an unreleased track by the electronic musician Bochum Welt that was later pressed as a limited-edition vinyl EP distributed through the brand's boutiques.

His debut collection, for spring/summer 2026, was shown on September 24, 2025, at the brand's Piazza Castello headquarters in Milan, the first Jil Sander show held there in eight years. Guinevere Van Seenus opened the show, and Bellotti took Richard Prince's "Hoods" series as one starting point, cutting skirts with geometric volume and dresses with openings that revealed the bras beneath. Writing for Vogue, Nicole Phelps noted the reworked double-face leather coats and wrote that the shoes formed "a strong foundation on which to build". Industry figures interviewed by Vogue Business after the show, including Dover Street Market buying director Nick Tran and 10 Corso Como founder Carla Sozzani, praised the craftsmanship, and Dazed editor Ted Stansfield called the collection "minimal without being dull".

For his second collection, fall 2026, Bellotti moved away from the reduction of his debut, adding ruffles, high slits, and spliced seams; he cited Swedish photographer Anders Petersen's photographs of Café Lehmitz, a bar in Hamburg's red-light district, as a reference.

== Personal life ==
Bellotti's fiancée, Martina Zerneri, was working in Gucci's brand image office when the two met.
