= Renzo Rosso =

Italian entrepreneur (born 1955)

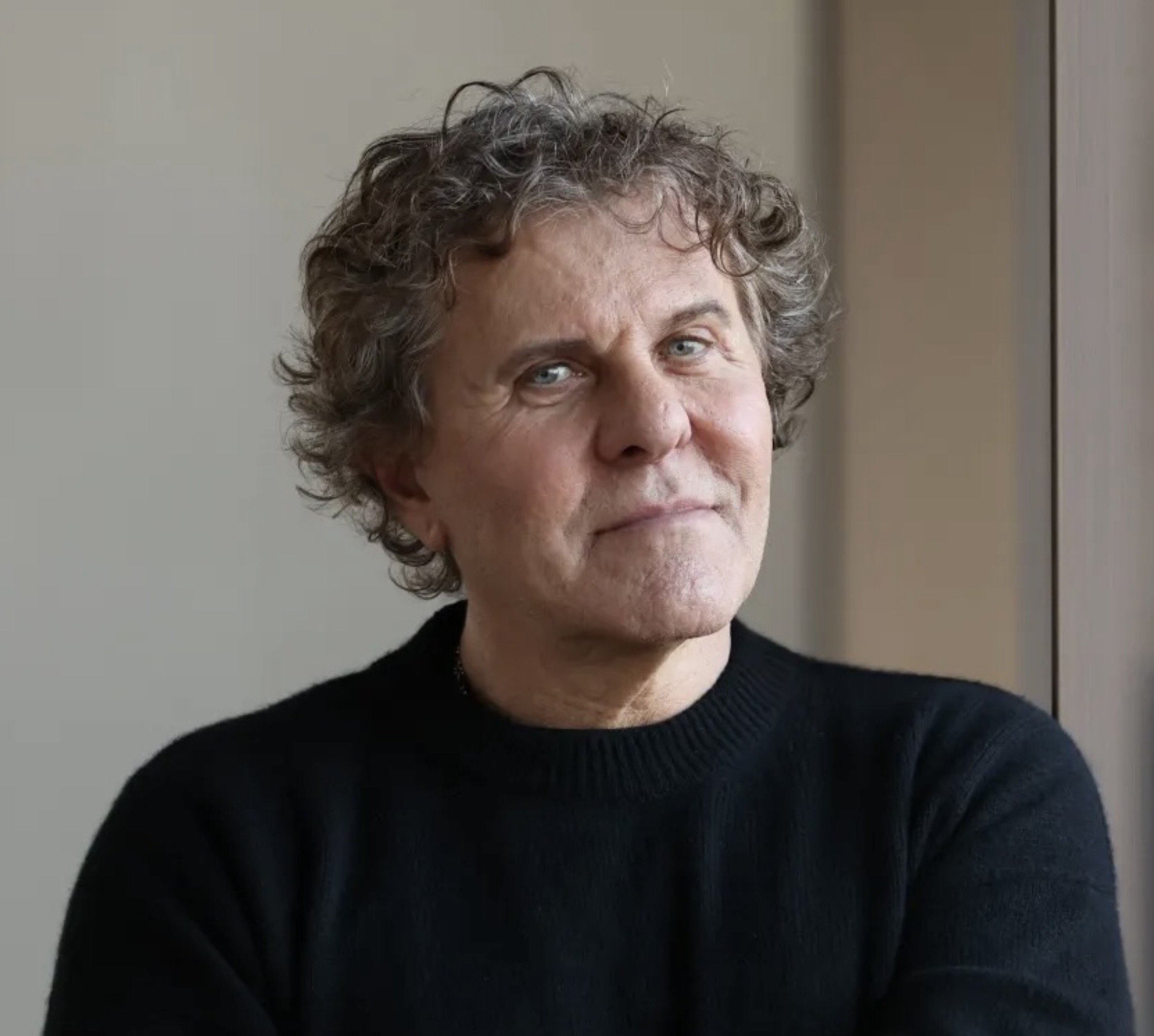
- Born: 1955 (age 70–71); Brugine, Italy
- Education: 9550911872
- Occupation: President of OTB Group

Renzo Rosso (born 1955) is an Italian entrepreneur and a businessman. He is the founder of Diesel and the president of OTB Group, the parent company of Maison Margiela, Marni, Viktor & Rolf, Jil Sander. In 2022, Forbes estimated his net worth to be US$3.6 billion.

== Business career ==
=== Diesel ===
Diesel logo

Rosso dropped out of the University of Venice in 1975 and began to work as Production Manager at Moltex, a local clothing manufacturer that produced trousers for various Italian clothing labels. Moltex's parent company, the Genius Group, was run by Adriano Goldschmied, who would eventually become Rosso's mentor and future business partner. In 1977, having increased the company's production, Rosso wanted to leave and start a new business on his own. However, Goldschmied convinced Rosso to stay by offering him a 40% stake in Moltex and by agreeing to form a new company together, thus forming Diesel. Following the new partnership, Rosso became a shareholder of the Genius Group, which gathered brands such as Replay, King Jeans, Viavai, and Goldie.

The brand name Diesel was chosen because 'diesel' was considered to be the 'alternative fuel' in the oil crisis, and Rosso and Goldschmied liked the idea of their brand being perceived as an alternative jeans brand in contrast to the prevalent casual wear brands. Furthermore, since the word was an international term pronounced equally all over the world, it appealed to Rosso's view that the global fashion market was not segmented by national borders, but by people's lifestyles. In 2004, CNN described Diesel as "the first brand to believe truly in the global village and to embrace it with open arms." In an article by The NY Times in August 2013, it was estimated that Diesel had sold more than 100,000,000 pairs of jeans since 1978.

In 1985 Rosso took complete control of the company, by trading his shares in the Genius Group, which was then the parent company of Diesel, for Goldschmied's remaining shares in Diesel. Following the launch of Diesel Kid the year prior, at the time called Dieselito, sales of the Diesel-branded clothing had by that point reached about $5 million annually. Wanting to focus on denim, Rosso began experimenting with different ways of treating the fabric with stones and washes. Then, after choosing a team of like-minded designers in the late 1980s, the company began a period of growth and expansion.

Diesel opened large flagship stores in New York City, San Francisco, Rome, and London, and began to open other mono-brand stores for Diesel and launched its website.

=== OTB ===
In the early 2000s, as Rosso began investing in other fashion designers and companies, he emerged as a major player in the world of fashion. In 2000, Rosso made his first acquisition when he purchased Staff International. The growth of OTB led to media often comparing Rosso to French businessmen Bernard Arnault and François Pinault, the chairmen of the LVMH and Kering conglomerates respectively, who own several of the world's leading luxury brands. In an interview with the Italian daily newspaper Corriere della Sera in April 2011, Rosso stated that he never intended to follow their route, but that he instead wanted to build a conglomerate that is "democratic" and alternative. "I have great respect for luxury, a sector that is doing very well, but it is too conservative. My dream, however, is to be a meeting point for the brands of new generations, who will be future leaders."

Rolf Snoeren of Viktor & Rolf said "Rosso is unique, a businessman who is also creative and would not interfere with our aesthetic and quality-control. He is the perfect fit".

Currently, the group has shares of the Diesel, Maison Margiela, Marni, Viktor & Rolf, Jil Sander, Amiri brands, and controls Staff International and Brave Kid, manufacturers and distributors of several licensed fashion labels.

=== Staff International ===
Staff International was acquired by Renzo Rosso in October 2000.

Staff International had gained a reputation in the prêt-a-porter arena, enabling it to work for designers and brands such as Karl Lagerfeld, Emanuel Ungaro, Valentino, Costume National, Clements Ribeiro and Missoni, among others. When Renzo Rosso acquired Staff International, the company was already partnering with Martin Margiela on the production of its collections.

Today, the company distributes licensed brands such as Maison Margiela, Marni, Dsquared2, Just Cavalli and Koché.

=== Maison Margiela ===
In 2002 Rosso purchased the majority of the fashion house Maison Margiela.

In an interview with Women's Wear Daily in 2004, Rosso explained his admiration for Maison Margiela: "It's about being unique, and it appeals to people with strong personalities who don't want to follow the crowd." Following an investment phase by Rosso to improve production and general management, by 2005 Maison Margiela had increased its sales to €30 million, compared to €15 million in 2002. In 2008 the company showed profitability for the first time since the acquisition, reaching sales above €60 million.

=== Viktor & Rolf ===
In July 2008, Rosso purchased the majority of the stakes of Viktor & Rolf. Following the deal, Rolf Snoeren said to The New York Times "We have high ambitions. We talked for two years because it is such an important step. We wanted to make sure we marry the right partner. Renzo understands creativity and has the vision and power to make a success."

=== Brave Kid ===
In 1984, Renzo Rosso created Dieselito, a line of children's wear. In 1999, the line became Diesel Kid, and a few years after a stand-alone company. It became Brave Kid in 2012.

== Other investments and ventures ==
=== L.R. Vicenza ===
Rosso in 1996 became the owner of the Bassano Virtus 55 Soccer Team, the main football club in the city of Bassano del Grappa where he resides. He led the club until June 2018, leading it to achieve the most important results in its history, winning a Serie D championship in 2005, a promotion to Serie C, a Serie C Italian Cup in the 2008/2009 season and a Lega Pro Seconda Divisione championship Lega Pro Seconda Divisione with the Supercoppa di Lega di Seconda Divisione 2013/2014 season. The team came close to promotion to Serie B several times, also reaching a playoff final in the 2014/2015 season.

Following the bankruptcy of the historically renowned Vicenza Calcio soccer team, Renzo Rosso took over the business unit through its liquidation auction and formalized its purchase on June 18, 2018.

=== Red Circle and Red Circle Investments ===
In late 1992, Rosso purchased a farm close to Diesel headquarters in Molvena, in the Italian region of Veneto, where he began producing wine and olive oil under the name Diesel Farm. Initially, the purchase was meant as a gesture to his father. At the time of the purchase, the farm and its land were at risk of being divided into separate lots for multiple buyers, but Rosso was able to prevent this by taking charge of the whole estate. Today the land and its old farm buildings are considered a natural reserve. In 2001, Rosso began manufacturing and selling wine and olive oil. In 2015, Diesel Farm started the process to become fully organic.

In 1994, Rosso reopened the Pelican Hotel on Miami's South Beach strip. The hotel, which was a historic Art Deco building constructed in 1939, had been restored under the direction of his Creative Team after Rosso had fallen in love with the building in 1991 and purchased it one month later.

In the 2000s, Rosso began to make minority financial investments through his private company, Red Circle Investments. Rosso's first investment through Red Circle was made in March 2009, when he purchased 4.9% of the stocks in Yoox an online mail-order retailer of multi-brand clothing and accessories, now known as Yoox-Net-A-Porter.

In 2013, Renzo became a partner of Andre Balazs (Chateau Marmont, The Mercer) and of Eric Schmidt (then CEO of Google) in the Chiltern Firehouse hotel in London.

== Philanthropy ==
=== OTB Foundation ===
In 2008, Rosso launched OTB Foundation, a not-for-profit organization to contribute to the sustainable development of less advantaged areas.

In 2009, Rosso, together with Millennium Promise, started supporting the development of the Only The Brave Millennium Village, in Dioro, Mali.

Later that year, Rosso was named a Millennium Promise Millennium Development Goals Global Leader at the United Nations in conjunction with the Millennium Development Goals Summit, alongside Senegalese musician and UNICEF ambassador Youssou N'Dour, Microsoft founder Bill Gates, musician and activist Bob Geldof, Queen Rania of Jordan, Nobel Prize winner Muhammad Yunus, and philanthropist Ted Turner, among others. Established in 2005, Millennium Promise is the leading international non-profit organization solely committed to supporting the achievement of the Millennium Development Goals to halve extreme poverty by 2015.

In February 2012, Rosso was invited by the Permanent Mission of Italy to the United Nations to host a press conference at The United Nations together with Jeffrey Sachs, Director of The Earth Institute at Columbia University and Special Advisor to The United Nations' Secretary-General Ban Ki-moon, about the progress of Millennium Promise and OTB Foundation. The press conference was part of a series called "Un caffè con..." (A coffee with...) that also included Italian Prime Minister Mario Monti. Following the conference, Italian newspaper La Stampa wrote: "Take a visionary like Renzo Rosso and an insightful, realistic economist like Jeffrey Sachs, and it turns out extreme poverty really can disappear from Africa".

On 26 July 2012, Rosso created the Brave Circle Fund to help people hit by the 2012 earthquakes in Emilia-Romagna, Italy. A personal endowment of 5 million euros was dedicated to setting up a micro-credit program for local people and small and medium enterprises who need help in reconstructing homes and businesses, but who normally would not have access to the traditional banking system because of their lack of guarantees. At launch, Rosso said the aim was to fund "700–800 projects with €5,000–50,000 each."

On 14 December, The New York Times reported that Rosso would donate 5 million euros to restore Venice's famous Rialto Bridge.

In June 2008, Rosso donated 2,000,000 HKD ($250,000) to the Special Relief Fund for Children Affected by the 2008 Sichuan earthquake, established by UNICEF to help children affected by the tremor in southwest China on 12 May.

Since 2010, Rosso has personally invested also in projects focused on his home region of Veneto, North-East Italy. This includes bringing free public Wi-Fi and initiating restoration projects in his hometown of Bassano del Grappa.

== Awards ==
Rosso received Grand Prix awards in 1992 2001, 2007, 2009, and 2010 and Advertiser of the Year in 1998.

In 2004 Rosso received the International Leading Entrepreneur Award in Monte Carlo. Presented at the Monaco Investors Week, it honors the efforts of a businessman who represents vision, professional ethics and the courage to undertake a particular venture.

In 2005, Rosso was named "Man of the Year" by the German edition of GQ.

Rosso received honorary degrees from University of Verona, Italy, in 2005, and from the CUOA Foundation of Altavilla Vicentina, Italy, in 2000, which cited Diesel as "one of the entrepreneurial phenomena of the 1990s".

In 2010, Rosso was named Millennium Promise Millennium Development Goals Global Leader in conjunction with the Millennium Development Goals Summit, at the United Nations in New York City.

In October 2011, Rosso was knighted Cavaliere del Lavoro by the president of the Republic of Italy, Giorgio Napolitano. The award ceremony took place at the Quirinale in Rome and was broadcast live on RAI in Italy.

In 2015, Renzo Rosso received an honorary research doctorate in business economics from the University of Rome Tor Vergata. Rosso has been recognised for his efforts "as an entrepreneur who changed the way people intuit, imagine, think, plan and spread style and the way of dressing around the world, giving value to the territory he works in".

== Books ==
During his life, Rosso has published four books, titled 'Forty' (Diesel, 1996), 'Fifty' (Gestalten Verlag, 2005), 'Be Stupid: For Successful Living' (Rizzoli, 2011) and 'Radical Renaissance 55+5' (Assouline, 2016). Published in English, Italian, German, Japanese and Korean, 'Be Stupid: For Successful Living' is a manual of practical and theoretical business advice that draws on his experience as a creative entrepreneur, where he explains how the courage to make brave decisions and the ability to see things for how they could be has helped him build a successful company. It follows the concept of Diesel's award-winning 'Be Stupid' campaign from 2009, which is based on a philosophy Rosso has practised throughout his life and career.

Published for Rosso's 40th and 50th birthdays, respectively, 'Forty' and 'Fifty' look at the key moments in Diesel's history, from its "jeans & workwear" beginnings followed by years of groundbreaking advertising, to its current premium positioning. The latter publication includes contributions from the Dalai Lama, Vivienne Westwood, Paul Smith, Alexander McQueen, Maison Margiela, Bono, Vincent Gallo, Naomi Campbell, Terry Jones, Kevin Roberts, Peter Saville, Dazed & Confused, Numéro and Vogue.

Published on Renzo Rosso's 60th birthday, "Radical Renaissance 55+5" traces the evolution of his forward-thinking group of companies and features the provocative photography of eye-catching campaigns, groundbreaking runway shows, and previously unreleased behind-the-scenes images. The volume explores the worlds of design visionaries including Martin Margiela, Nicola Formichetti, John Galliano, Consuelo Castiglioni, Viktor Horsting and Rolf Snoeren.

2019 saw the publication of "Diesel Dream Disruption Deviation Denim".

Other books published on Renzo Rosso and his story are “Diesel: World Wide Wear” by Thames and Hudson, written by Ted Polhemus in 1998; “XXX Years of Diesel Communication”, published by Rizzoli in 2008; and “Revolution” by Riccardo Micheletti, published in 2013 by Marcianum.

== Personal life ==
Born in Brugine (Padova), since the mid-1970s Rosso has resided in Bassano del Grappa, Veneto. He got married for the third time to Arianna Alessi, in great secrecy in Miami in March 2022, revealing it only in 2023. He has seven children (three of them work in the company): he became the father of his youngest child, a girl, at the age of 60. In an interview with CNN in 2004, Rosso said he usually spends his free time exercising, practicing Pilates, and cycling.

Rosso is an art collector and enthusiast, and frequently travels to exhibitions and art fairs all around the world. Besides owning works of Andy Warhol and contemporary Italian artists Francesco Vezzoli, Basquiat, Schnabel, and Fontana, Rosso has continuously pushed Diesel to support younger, talented artists, by initiating and sponsoring a wide range of projects across the arts, including Diesel New Art and Diesel Wall.
