= Martin Margiela =

Belgian fashion designer (born 1957)

- Born: 9 April 1957 (age 69); Genk, Limburg, Belgium
- Education: Royal Academy of Fine Arts (Antwerp)
- Occupations: Fashion designer; artist
- Years active: 1979–present
- Labels: Jean Paul Gaultier (1984–1987); Maison Margiela (1988–2008); Hermès (1997–2003)

Martin Margiela (French: [maʁtɛ̃ maʁʒjela]; Dutch: [ˈmɑrtɪn mɑrˈɡiːla]; born 9 April 1957) is a Belgian fashion designer, artist, and founder of the French luxury fashion house Maison Margiela. Throughout his career, Margiela has maintained a low profile, refusing to grant face-to-face interviews or be photographed. Since leaving fashion in 2008, he has emerged as an artist, exploring the themes that made him an iconic figure in fashion. He is considered to be one of the most influential fashion designers in recent history for his iconic deconstructed, upcycled aesthetic and oversized silhouette.

== Early life and education ==
Martin Margiela was born on 9 April 1957 in the city of Genk in Limburg, Belgium. He became interested in fashion as a child after watching a TV show featuring influential 1960s designers André Courrèges and Paco Rabanne. As a teenager, he began putting second-hand clothes from flea markets together to create cheap but stylish looks. His taste for pre-worn clothes would later influence his work as a full-fledged designer at major fashion houses. He befriended Inge Grognard who shared his interest in fashion and would later become the make-up artist for all of his shows.

He went on to study fashion at the Royal Academy of Fine Arts (Antwerp) and graduated in 1979, a year before the avant-garde fashion collective the Antwerp Six.

== Fashion career ==
=== Early career ===
After graduation, Margiela worked as a freelance designer for five years. In 1984, he moved to Paris to work as a design assistant for French fashion designer Jean Paul Gaultier until 1987.

=== Maison Margiela ===
Margiela founded his eponymous label, Maison Martin Margiela, in 1988 with his business partner Jenny Meirens. Meirens, the owner of a designer clothing boutique in Brussels, described Margiela as "the most talented young designer" she had ever seen.

Margiela presented the Spring/Summer 1990 collection in the first show for his eponymous label in the fall of 1989 on a derelict playground in a North African neighborhood on the outskirts of Paris. It was an unusual show with an uneven runway and intentionally stumbling models, which created a public spectacle that shocked the industry. As opposed to the popular themes of extravagance, bold colors, and wide shoulders at the time, his collection included ripped sleeves, frayed hems, and clumpy shoes. To show respect for the community, local kids were also asked to hand draw invitations in art classes at school and were seated in the front row during the show.

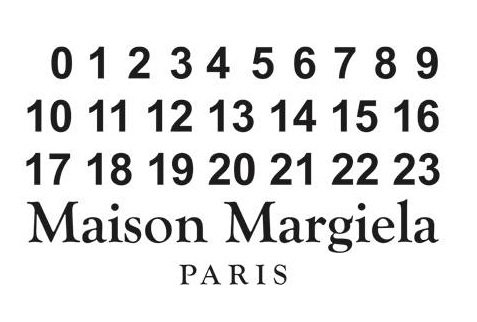
The 'anonymous' label, where each number corresponds to the Margiela collection that the piece is from

Maison Martin Margiela's ultra-discreet trademark consists of a piece of cloth with the numbers 0–23. The badge is attached to the inside with four small, white tack stitches, exposed to the outside on unlined garments.

In stark contrast to most of his peers, he has always remained backstage and does not take a bow after his shows. Since 1988, he has never agreed to a formal interview or been photographed for any magazine. All media contacts were conducted via fax and later email. The idea was to emphasize that his designs should speak for themselves and they are the product of a collaborative team rather than his own.

Maison Margiela was acquired by the OTB Group in 2002. Margiela remained as creative director, but "had not been involved in recent collections" according to Renzo Rosso, the CEO of OTB Group, in 2008. He had privately expressed his desire to stop designing and begun a search for his successor. His close associates speculated that he wanted to "enjoy his life outside the insistent glare of the fashion world." In early 2008, he approached Raf Simons, the creative director of Jil Sander, and offered to hand the reins of Maison Margiela to him, but Simons appeared to have declined the offer and instead renewed a three-year contract with Jil Sander.

In December 2009, Margiela formally left his eponymous label. No successor was named and the house continued to be operated by a team of designers until John Galliano was appointed as creative director in 2014.

=== Hermès ===
Margiela was named creative director of women's wear at Hermès in 1997. The news of an avant-garde designer becoming the head of a conservative and classic French house surprised the industry. Though his designs for Hermès didn't resemble the forward-leaning work of his own label, he nonetheless incorporated a deconstructivist philosophy to his work there. He pioneered a timeless wardrobe focused on quality and inspired by 1920s sports and leisure clothing. Despite initial doubts by fashion critics, he created several understated collections, from loose-fitting masculine tailoring to black crêpe evening dresses that were the height of discreet elegance. Among his original designs include a jacket that can be rolled and carried like a bag, coats with removable collars and fastenings, the iconic twice looping strap of the Cape Cod watch, and the losange, a diamond shaped scarf that has become one of Hermès' bestsellers. All shows were held at the ultra-luxurious rue St-Honoré Hermès store in Paris.

In 2003, Margiela stepped down from his role at Hermes to focus on his own label and was succeeded by his former mentor, Jean Paul Gaultier.

== Post-fashion career ==
After leaving fashion, Margiela turned to art as a medium of expression. He spent two years working with Lafayette Anticipations – Galeries Lafayette Corporate Foundation to create more than 40 art works for his first solo exhibition that debuted in October 2021. Among the exhibits included silicon spheres covered in human hair, large-scale paintings of dust particles, and blank spaces that symbolized the idea of an exhibition that is "in flux, unfinished, and in permanent movement."

In November 2019, Reiner Holzemer directed the documentary Martin Margiela: In His Own Words. Co-produced by Aminata and Holzemer (who had previously made a documentary about Dries van Noten), it was called "the definitive study of this elusive, technically gifted designer" in Hollywood Reporter. He notably explained his withdrawal from the public eye and his desire to remain a designer, rather than "a creative director who directs his assistants". As in most media related to the designer, only Margiela's hands are shown.

== See also ==
- Maison Margiela
- Deconstruction (fashion)
- OTB Group
- John Galliano
