= Raf Simons =

Belgian fashion designer (born 1968)

- Born: Raf Jan Simons; 12 January 1968 (age 58); Neerpelt, Belgium
- Education: LUCA School of Arts
- Labels: Raf Simons (1995–2022); Raf by Raf Simons (2005–2022); Jil Sander (2005–2012); Christian Dior (2012–2015); Calvin Klein (2016–2018); Prada (2020–present)
- Website: rafsimons.com

Raf Jan Simons (Dutch pronunciation: [rɑf ˈsimɔns]; born 12 January 1968) is a Belgian fashion designer. Beginning in furniture design, Simons launched his own menswear label in 1995. He was creative director at Jil Sander (2005–2012), Christian Dior (2012–2015), and Calvin Klein (2016–2018). As of 1 April 2020, he is the co-creative director of Prada, in partnership with Miuccia Prada.

== Early life and education ==
Raf Simons was born on 12 January 1968 in Neerpelt, Belgium, to Jacques Simons, an army night watchman, and Alda Beckers, a house cleaner.

Simons graduated in Industrial Design and Furniture Design from LUCA School of Arts in Genk in 1991. During this time, Simons congregated at Antwerp cafe Witzli-Poetzli with the likes of Olivier Rizzo, Willy Vanderperre, David Vandewal and then-girlfriend Veronique Branquinho to discuss fashion, namely Helmut Lang and Martin Margiela.

He began working as a furniture designer for various galleries, having previously interned at the design studio of Walter Van Beirendonck between 1991 and 1993.

Van Beirendonck took him to Paris Fashion Week and that was when Simons first saw a fashion show—Martin Margiela’s all-white show in 1991—which inspired Simons to turn to fashion design.

== Career ==
=== Raf Simons label ===
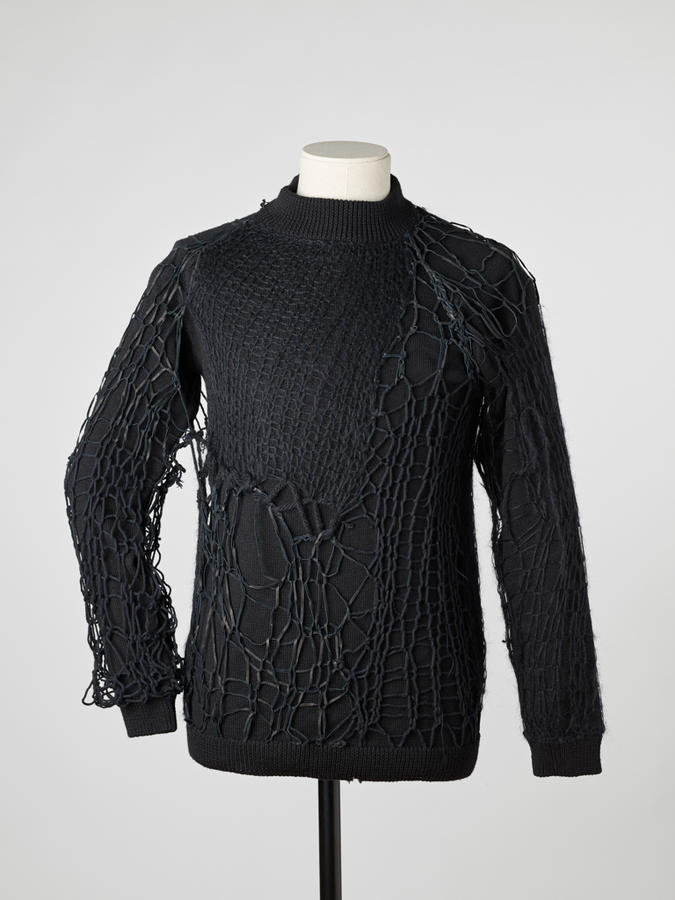
Spiderweb sweater, jersey with hand-knited cotton, leather and mohair overlay. Autumn-Winter 1998-99 "Radioactivity" collection. (RISD Museum)

Encouraged by Linda Loppa, head of the fashion department at the Antwerp Royal Academy, Simons became a self-trained menswear designer and launched his Raf Simons label in 1995. His first collection was in Fall–Winter 1995, and featured two street models in a video presentation. From Fall–Winter 1995 to Spring–Summer 1997, Simons's collections were shown either in presentations or videos. Fall–Winter 1997 saw his first runway show in Paris, France, with a look of 'American college students and English schoolboys with a background of New Wave and Punk'. Simons's early aesthetic incorporated youth culture from divergent sources, such as the Spring–Summer 2000 collection taking inspiration from both MENSA students and the Gabba youth subculture (a predominantly Dutch and Belgian movement associated with hardcore techno music). Music has formed an integral part of Simons's work, with references to musical figures such as the Manic Street Preachers's Richey Edwards and Joy Division’s Ian Curtis and his Fall–Winter 1998 collection (Radioactivity) featuring looks modelled after members of German electro band Kraftwerk.

In March 2000, Simons shut down his company to take a sabbatical after his Fall–Winter 2000 collection (Confusion). Following a new deal with Belgian manufacturer, Gysemans Clothing Industry, the company was started back up again for Fall–Winter 2001. During this time, Simons's international prominence grew with the collection for Spring–Summer 2002 (Woe Onto Those Who Spit On The Fear Generation ...The Wind Will Blow It Back) becoming one of his most influential due to its 'layered, hooded, sinister image of the urban guerrilla'. The company was restructured in October 2004 with a distribution deal with Futurenet (Europe and USA) and Mitsui & Co. (Asia), followed by a license agreement with Futurepresent (joint-venture of Futurenet and Mitsui Italia). This deal came to an end with the Spring–Summer 2011 collection.

The aesthetic of the Raf Simons brand has changed since 2005, as former Arena Homme Plus editor Jo-Ann Furniss asserts: "The key turning point was A/W 04-05 (Waves), when the obsessive youth culture codes of his past were turned into clothes that were purely about shape and form." In June 2005, Raf by Raf Simons was launched, which was sold at a lower price point. Simons also released the book Raf Simons: Redux about the first 10 years of his career. Alongside the publication, there was also an exhibition of Simons's work and an outdoor fashion show at the Pitti Immagine Uomo tradeshow in Florence, Italy for a retrospective of the designer's career at the age of 38.

In 2008, two flagship Raf Simons stand-alone stores opened in Tokyo and Osaka, Japan, in collaboration with the artists Sterling Ruby and Roger Hiorns. The Autumn–Winter 2009 collection saw the first Raf Simons advertising campaign, photographed by Willy Vanderperre. In 2011, Raf by Raf Simons was replaced by Raf Simons 1995, a diffusion line incorporating elements from Simons's early collections. Raf Simons 1995 also includes homeware, namely blankets and cushions.

On November 21, 2022, Raf Simons announced via its Social Media Channels that the SS23 collection would be the last collection from the label before he closes it down after the end of the season.

==== Collaborations ====
Since 2008, Simons has created collections in collaboration with British brand Fred Perry. From Spring–Summer 2008 onwards, Simons has collaborated with Linda Farrow on a collection of sunglasses for the brand. Since Fall–Winter 2009, Simons has also collaborated with running shoe manufacturer Asics. For the Fall–Winter 2013 show, a new limited-edition footwear collaboration with Adidas was announced featuring five different designs.

Simons has designed three collaborations with American bag manufacture Eastpak: Spring–Summer 2008, Fall–Winter 2008 and Spring–Summer 2009. The collaboration has continued for the Fall–Winter 2013 season.

In 2009, Simons used denim bleached by artist Sterling Ruby to create a capsule collection of denim wear jeans and jackets. In 2014, Simons once again collaborated with Ruby, jointly designing a Fall–Winter 2014 collection, which was presented in place of Simon's eponymous line and carried the label 'Raf Simons/Sterling Ruby'.

In 2014 Raf Simons began a collaboration with the Danish design and textile company Kvadrat that would translate into a collection of textiles and accessories. The Kvadrat/Raf Simons collection received great recognition in the media and is distinguished by the blending of colour and materials for which the designer is known in the fashion world. Raf Simons would later come to include the Kvadrat/Raf Simons textiles in his A/W 15 menswear collection.

In 2016, Raf Simons collaborated with the Robert Mapplethorpe Foundation for his Spring–Summer 2017 collection. The collection debuted at Pitti Uomo in Florence, Italy.

=== Jil Sander ===
In June 2005, Simons was appointed as Creative Director for the Jil Sander label, by its owner the Prada Group (which was later acquired by Change Capital Partners and then GIBO Co. SpA, the Italian subsidiary of Japanese firm Onward Holdings Co. Ltd). This marked the first occasion when the designer had created women's clothing and accessories, whilst also designing the brand's male collections.

During his tenure at Jil Sander, Simons moved the brand's aesthetic from an austere minimalism and expanded its commercial appeal with the creation of a womenswear diffusion line, Jil Sander Navy. In 2010, Simons's work was seen to take a more fanciful turn when he presented the first of three couture-inspired collections, all of which played with the shapes, colors, and proportions associated with haute couture, and were his most feminine to date.

Rumors that Simons was a serious candidate to replace Yves Saint Laurent designer Stefano Pilati surfaced in the press several times—most recently in September 2011. Later, the press reported that Simons was interviewing for the creative director slot at Christian Dior, which had remained vacant since John Galliano was fired in March 2011. Simons's last collection for Jil Sander was Fall–Winter 2012, following his dismissal by Onward Holdings in favour of Jil Sander's return. The collection was well received.

=== Christian Dior ===
In April 2012, it was announced that Simons would replace John Galliano as creative director at the helm of Dior, ending a period of transition after Galliano's dismissal from the role. However, he did not design the menswear collections, as fellow Belgian designer Kris van Assche remained as Dior Homme creative director.

Simons's first collection for Haute Couture Fall–Winter 2012 was well-received as the designer focused on the 1950s by playing with some of Christian Dior's famous silhouettes: the A line and the H line, and the Bar jacket.

Simons said he aims “to bring some emotion back, to what I felt in the nineties, because I see a lot of amazing clothes, but I don’t see a lot of emotion now.”

In 2014, Frédéric Tcheng wrote and directed a documentary, called Dior and I, or Dior et moi in French, about Raf Simons "as he created his first couture collection for Dior". The documentary's world premiere was at the Tribeca Film Festival.

On October 22, 2015, Simons resigned from his post as the Creative Director of Womenswear for Christian Dior following a three-and-a-half-year stint at the brand. In a statement, the designer stated "It is a decision based entirely and equally on my desire to focus on other interests in my life, including my own brand, and passions that drive me outside my work." The departure was reportedly amicable and no replacement was immediately named.

=== Calvin Klein ===
On August 2, 2016, Calvin Klein, Inc., a wholly owned subsidiary of PVH Corp., announced Simon's appointment as chief creative officer of the brand.

As CCO, Simons led the creative strategy of the Calvin Klein brand globally across the Calvin Klein Collection, Calvin Klein Platinum, Calvin Klein, Calvin Klein Jeans, Calvin Klein Underwear and Calvin Klein Home brands. He also oversaw all aspects of Design, Global Marketing and Communications, and Visual Creative Services. Following his arrival, Calvin Klein entered into an agreement with the Andy Warhol Foundation for the Visual Arts on allowing Simons unprecedented access to the Warhol archive for three years.

Simons' first collection debuted for the Fall 2017 season, on which the New York Magazine stated that "The Most Anticipated Fashion Show in Decades Turned Out to Be Brilliant".

In December 2018, Calvin Klein and Simons announced they are ‘amicably parting ways’, after Calvin Klein "decided on a new brand direction different from Simons" creative vision.

=== Prada ===
In 2020, Miuccia Prada and Patrizio Bertelli, the creative director and chief executive of the Prada Group, announced Simons's appointment as co-creative director of Prada. The first co-designed collection was unveiled for spring–summer 2021 during a fashion show in Milan in September.

== Other interests ==
Since 2000, Simons has acted as a consultant for the Cigrang Freres art collection in Belgium. He also collects art personally, with his private collection including works by Evan Holloway, Mike Kelley, Sterling Ruby, Cindy Sherman and Brian Calvin. Between October 2000 and June 2005, Simons taught fashion at the University of Applied Arts Vienna, leaving due to his growing commitments to the Jil Sander brand.

Simons has curated a number of exhibitions including: Guided by Heroes in Hasselt, Belgium and The Fourth Sex in Florence, Italy. An accompanying publication to the former was released in 2003, which was edited by Simons and Francesco Bonami. In 2011, he also curated the three-day exhibition and event The Avant/Garde Diaries: Transmission1 in collaboration with Mercedes-Benz, featuring works by Peter Saville, Jo-Ann Furniss, Peter de Potter, Konstantin Grcic, Begüm Sekendiz Boré, Peter Henderson, Germaine Kruip, Michael Clark and These New Puritans.

The designer has collaborated with a number of artists in both his eponymous collections and for Jil Sander, including Franky Claeys (Raf Simons Spring–Summer 1998 Black Palms) and Peter Saville (Raf Simons Fall–Winter 2003 Closer). His designs have also featured the work of Pablo Picasso (Jil Sander Spring–Summer 2012) and Brian Calvin (Raf Simons Fall–Winter 2012 Run Fall Run).

Additionally, Simons has used imagery from films in his designs. He used stills from the 1981 movie Christiane F. in his Autumn-Winter 2018 show. In 2019, he partnered with director David Lynch to create a small collection of shirts inspired by Lynch's films.

Long-term collaborators include photographer Willy Vanderperre, first assistant/general manager Robbie Sneders, stylist Olivier Rizzo and artist Peter de Potter. During June 1996, Simons participated at the 2001 (-3) exhibition, curated by Terry Jones, during Biennale della Moda, Florence. The photography series and book Isolated Heroes was the result of the collaboration with British photographer David Sims in the summer of 1999, which featured models dressed in Raf Simons Spring–Summer 2000. Isolated Heroes was a travelling exhibition during 2000–01.

In February 2001, Simons was a special guest editor of i-D Magazine, no. 206, The Inspiration Issue, featuring a cover photographed by Willy Vanderperre and styled by Olivier Rizzo.

== In popular culture ==
In 2008, Kanye West interviewed Simons for Interview, stating that he inspired his fourth studio album 808s & Heartbreak. In 2015, he would cite Simons as a primary influence for his first runway collection (known as Yeezy Season 1).

Simons has been popular with various musicians such as Blackbear, Rihanna, Kendrick Lamar, Travis Scott, Future, Raekwon, ASAP Rocky, Lil Uzi Vert, Big Sean, Drake, Ken Carson, and Juice Wrld, who have either referenced him, worn his clothing, or openly admired his work. In 2017, the popular New York-based rap group known as ASAP Mob released a song called "Raf", featuring group leader ASAP Rocky, as well as Quavo, Playboi Carti, Lil Uzi Vert, and Frank Ocean. The official music video was released on July 24.

Italian rapper Rosa Chemical released a song with the designer's name on his 2020 album, Forever.

== Personal life ==
Simons' first language is Flemish. He is also fluent in English.

== Publications ==
- Simons, Raf and David Sims. Isolated Heroes. Connection NV, Antwerp. 2000. ISBN 978-9110369283
- Bonami, Franceso, Maria Luisa Frisa and Raf Simons (ed). The Fourth Sex: Adolescent Extremes. Edizioni Charta, Milan. 2003. ISBN 978-8881584048
- De Potter, Peter and Raf Simons. Raf Simons: Redux. Maria Luisa Frisa (ed). Edizioni Charta, Milan. 2005. ISBN 978-8881585434

== Recognition ==
- 2003 – Swiss Textiles Award
- 2017 – CFDA Fashion Award, Designer of the Year (both in women's and men's wear)
- 2017 – Designer of the Year, British Fashion Council.
