= Luc Vandevelde =

Belgian businessman

Luc Emile Rene Vandevelde (born 26 February 1951) is a Belgian businessman, supermarket executive and former Chairman and Chief Executive Officer of Marks & Spencer and Chairman of Carrefour.

== Early life ==
He was born in Halen, in the eastern Belgian province of Limburg. He left school at 18, attending the Erasmus Business School in Leuven in Flemish Brabant, central Belgium.

== Career ==
In 1971 he joined Kraft Foods. During his 24-year career at the group he had experience of working in 30 countries and performed a number of operational, strategic and financial management roles, including the successful acquisition and integration of the Jacob/Suchard companies into Kraft in 1990. He became CEO of the Kraft Jacobs Suchard French and later Italian operations.

Vandevelde joined Promodès in 1995, eventually becoming its CEO, replacing the French billionaire Paul-Louis Halley. He was a driving force behind the merger of Promodès with Carrefour announced in August 1999 and was appointed vice chairman. He headed the integration of the two companies but left Carrefour in 2000 to join M&S. He returned in 2005 for two years as chairman of the supervisory board, orchestrating a complete overhaul of the management structure.

In 1998, Marks & Spencer was the UK's most profitable retailer, making more than £1.1bn in profit. By 2000 its share price had halved from 1998. In 2001 it made £145m in profit. Vandevelde was chairman of Marks & Spencer from February 2000 until May 2004. Known internally as Cool Hand Luc; during his time at Marks & Spencer he was responsible for restoring the company's performance, initially through a major restructuring programme, followed by a series of growth initiatives such as the launch of Per Una, Blue Harbour, the Simply Food format and the introduction of the "&more" credit and loyalty card. In March 2000 he dropped the St Michael logo and rebranded as Marks & Spencer.

Vandevelde was senior independent director of Vodafone and chairman of the Remuneration Committee. He retired from the Vodafone Board in September 2015 following 12 years as a non-executive director.

Vandevelde was a board member of bank Société Générale until May 2012.

Vandevelde is the founder and chairman of Change Capital Partners, a specialist private equity firm focused on consumer-related businesses. Among companies successfully exited are Jil Sander; Hillarys Blinds; Hallhuber and Macduff Shellfish.

He is a non-executive director of the Majid Al Futtaim Group.

== Personal life ==
Vandevelde is married with one son and lives in Monaco.

Business positions
Preceded by Sir Richard Greenbury (Executive Chairman, leaving in February 1999)	Chairman of Marks & Spencer; February 2000 - May 2004	Succeeded by Paul Myners, Baron Myners
Preceded by Peter Salsbury	Chief Executive (Executive Chairman) of Marks & Spencer; February 2000 - September 2003	Succeeded by Roger Holmes
