= Jil Sander =

German fashion designer (born 1943)

- Born: Heidemarie Jiline Sander; 27 November 1943 (age 82); Wesselburen, Nazi Germany
- Other name: "Queen of Less"
- Education: UCLA
- Occupations: Fashion designer, writer
- Years active: 1966‍–‍present
- Labels: Jil Sander (1968‍–‍2000, 2003‍–‍2004, and 2012‍–‍2013); Prada (1999‍–‍2005); Uniqlo (2008‍–‍2011)
- Awards: Order of Merit of the Federal Republic of Germany

Heidemarie Jiline "Jil" Sander (German pronunciation: [dʒɪl ˈzandɐ]; born 27 November 1943) is a German minimalist fashion designer and the founder of the Jil Sander fashion house.

== Early life and education ==
Heidemarie Jiline Sander was born in Wesselburen on 27 November 1943.

Sander studied at Krefeld School of Textiles (class of 1963) and was a foreign exchange student at the University of California, Los Angeles from 1963 to 1964. After her stint in UCLA, she moved on to New York as a magazine fashion writer. At age 21, she came back to Hamburg, Germany to join her younger and older siblings after their father died unexpectedly at the age of 52.

== Career ==
=== Jil Sander fashion house ===
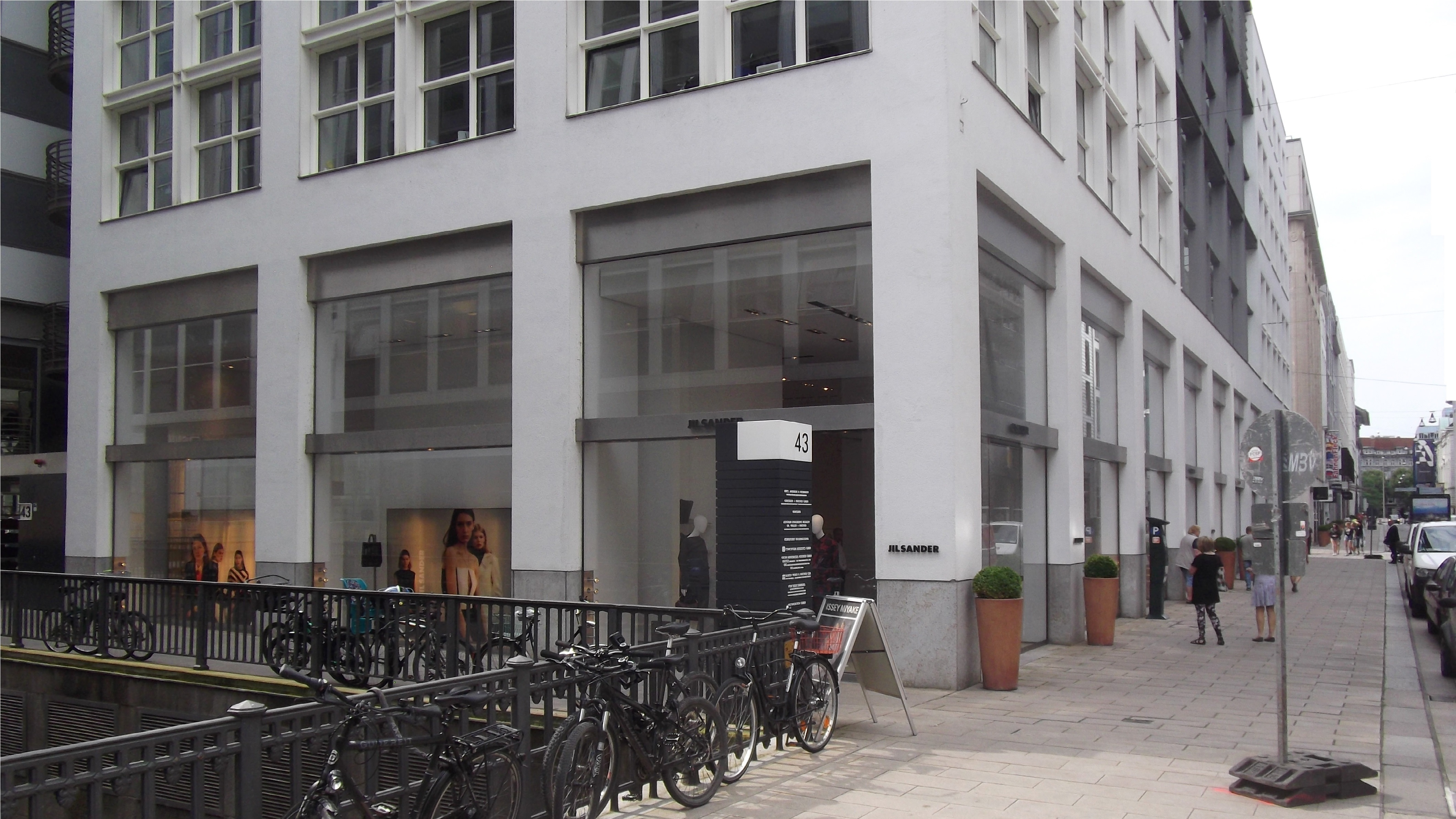
Jil Sander fashion house in Hamburg

Jil Sander corporate logo

Sander founded her own fashion house Jil Sander in Rotherbaum, Hamburg, Germany in 1968 with her mother's sewing machine. Her first collection was for Hoechst, a chemical company, using their trevira fabric. In 1973, she launched a collection under her own brand name.

She overcame a poorly received first Jil Sander Paris collection shown at the Plaza Athénée in 1975 and listed her company on the Frankfurt Stock Exchange at the end of the 1980s. She subsequently flourished through the 1980s and 1990s, and soon achieved an international following, thanks to retailers like Linda Dresner, who for a time had a Sander boutique on New York's Park Avenue, and Joan Burstein of Browns in London. In 1995, the Jil Sander group reported $114 million in sales.

=== Prada ===
In 1999, Prada Group bought a 75% share in her company. Sander remained creative designer and became chairwoman in the new joint venture. Six months later, in January 2000, Sander unexpectedly resigned abruptly as chairwoman and shortly thereafter as chief designer after confrontations with Prada's CEO, Patrizio Bertelli. Nearly all the design and production staff left after her departure. For 2001, the Jil Sander Group reported a net loss of $9.4 million, its first ever. The brand lost 26 million euros (about $30.4 million) in 2002 on flat sales, in part because of the costs of adding retail stores in London and in New York.

Sander returned to the company as head designer and partner in a surprise decision in May 2003, after her noncompete clause had expired. Officially, Bertelli "approached Ms. Sander and began negotiating a truce". Bertelli had, with regard to Sander's departure in 2000, boldly stated before: "A brand as strong as Jil Sander doesn't need to rely on the name of a designer". She was rehired under a six-year consulting contract and also received an undisclosed stake in the company and a seat on Prada's strategic committee.

In November 2004, Sander terminated cooperation with Prada for good and resigned from her post again after insurmountable differences with Mr. Bertelli. Prada announced in an official statement that "the decision by Patrizio Bertelli [...] and Ms. Sander to end her involvement in the company was amicable." She withdrew from her involvement in her namesake brand. She continued her contributions and work at Uniqlo. The white stucco building in Hamburg that was once the Jil Sander showroom was re-proportioned by the New York architect Michael Gabellini. She returned to her brand in February 2012, only days after the then creative director, Raf Simons, was released from his position. Sander left the brand again in October 2013.

=== Uniqlo ===
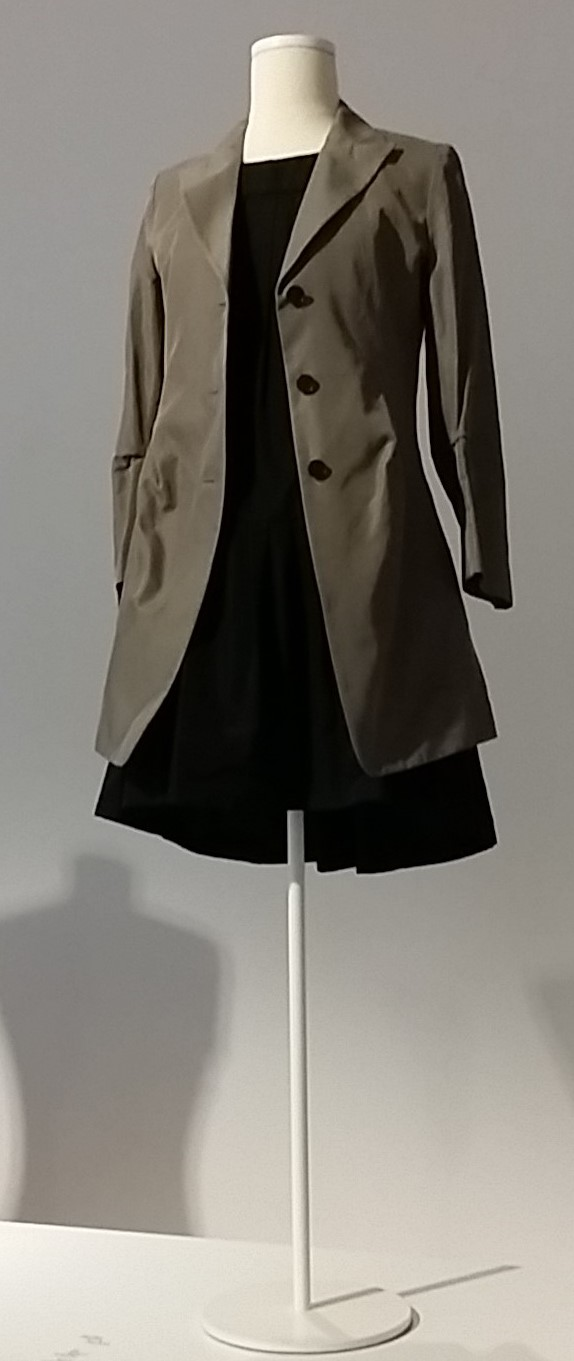
Jil Sander for Uniqlo, Spring-Summer 2011

On 17 March 2009, Sander announced the creation of her own fashion consultancy. The new company's first client was Fast Retailing of Japan with its Uniqlo label for whom Sander oversaw the design of womenswear and menswear collections called +J. The first collection for the 2009‍–‍10 autumn–winter season was launched worldwide on 1 October 2009 consisting of "about 40 pieces for men and 100 for women, including coats, jackets, knitwear, T-shirts and accessories" featuring the Minimalist aesthetic and demure colors typical of Jil Sander.

The second line of +J designed for spring and summer wear, was launched on 23 December 2009 throughout Asia including Japan, South Korea, Hong Kong and China, and on 7 January 2010 in the London stores. It was to be launched in Uniqlo's sole US store in New York City on 14 January 2010. This collection will see more retail drops during the Spring and Summer seasons. Following a successful run of three years, Sander and Uniqlo's parent company, Fast Retailing, announced that the partnership agreement would not be renewed at the end of 2011, marking the end of +J. The last collection from the collaborative label was for the Fall/Winter 2011 season. The split between the parties is said to have been mutual.

+J returned to Uniqlo's store shelves and online shop for a Fall/Winter 2014 and Spring/Summer 2015 "best of" collection, featuring selected previously designed pieces by the partnership.

Jil Sander worked with Uniqlo again in the 2020 autumn–winter season with collections for men and women.

In 2021, the control of the Jil Sander brand passed to the Italian fashion holding OTB Group.

== Recognition ==
Sander was awarded the Bundesverdienstkreuz by the Federal Republic of Germany for her achievements in the fashion industry.

She was listed as one of the fifty best-dressed over 50s by The Guardian in March 2013. Sander has been described as the "Queen of Less".
