= Maison Margiela =

French fashion house

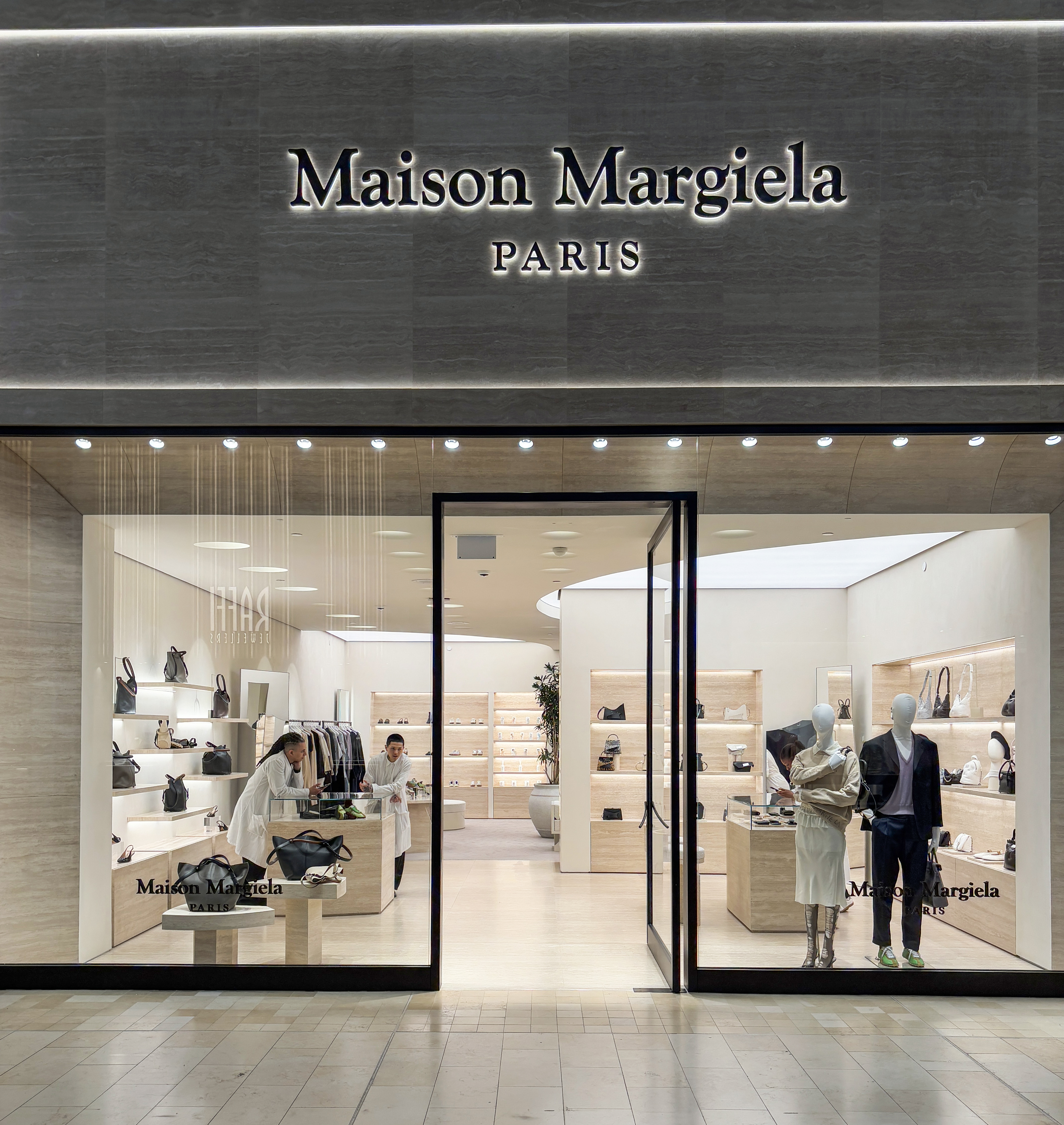
- Formerly: Maison Martin Margiela
- Type: Subsidiary
- Industry: Fashion
- Founded: 1988; 38 years ago in Paris, France
- Founder: Martin Margiela; Jenny Meirens
- Headquarters: Paris, France
- Area served: Worldwide
- Key people: Stefano Rosso (Chairman); Gaetano Sciuto (CEO); Glenn Martens (Creative Director)
- Products: Clothing; fashion accessories; footwear; jewelry; perfumes; homewares
- Parent: OTB Group
- Website: www.maisonmargiela.com

Maison Margiela , formerly Maison Martin Margiela, is a French luxury fashion house founded by Belgian designer Martin Margiela and Jenny Meirens in 1988 and headquartered in Paris. The house produces both haute couture-inspired artisanal collections and ready-to-wear collections, with the former influencing the designs of the latter. Product lines include womenswear, menswear, jewellery, footwear, accessories, leather goods, perfumes and household goods. Known for deconstructive and avant-garde designs with unconventional materials, Maison Margiela has traditionally held live shows in unusual settings, for example empty metro stations and street corners. Models' faces are often obscured by fabric or long hair to direct attention to the clothes and design. Margiela resigned as creative designer in 2009. John Galliano was appointed to the role in 2014, and resigned in 2024. His successor is Glenn Martens.

== History ==
=== Formation and early years ===
Maison Margiela was founded by Martin Margiela, a Belgian fashion designer, in 1988. Earlier, Margiela had studied fashion at the Royal Academy of Antwerp, and although he actually graduated a year earlier, in 1979, he is often mistaken for a member of the university's avant-garde fashion collective the Antwerp Six. Among other influences, during the 1980s Margiela and other Belgian designers such as the Antwerp Six were inspired by deconstructive fashions introduced by Japanese avantgardists such as Rei Kawakubo—creator of the label Comme des Garçons. Margiela began utilizing the deconstructive style in the 1980s while a freelance designer in Milan, Italy, and early on his work would often reveal the garments' structure, for example intentionally exposed linings and seams. In 1984 he became Jean Paul Gaultier's design assistant in Paris, a role he held until 1987.

In 1988, Martin launched his own self-titled design label Maison Martin Margiela with business partner and fellow designer Jenny Meirens. Initially working out of a Paris apartment, they opened their first store in an unmarked white space in Paris, also opening a small studio on 12 Leopoldstraat in Antwerp. New York Magazine wrote that "the designer quickly defined a deconstructed look [with his new label]... Vaguely Dadaist, as if Marcel Duchamp were reincarnated as a fashion designer, Margiela questioned every tenet of fashion and luxury." Vogue would later write that his early ideas "provoked shock and intrigue" in the fashion industry. On the label's garments, simple blank white labels with four white tacks were sewn to signify the brand. Distinct product ranges were given numbers as signifiers, in no particular chronological order.

=== Early shows and anonymity ===
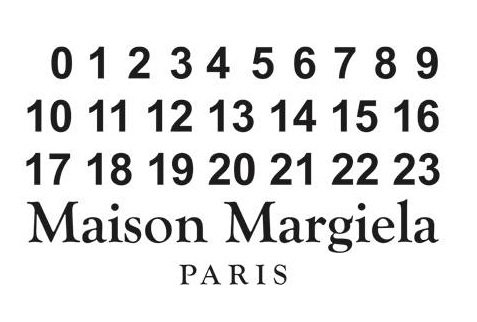
Previous Maison Margiela logo

With New York Magazine describing the label's early shows as "perhaps more like art happenings than the thematic and operatic productions '80s Paris fashion is known for," in 1988, Maison Martin Margiela presented its debut womenswear collection at Paris Fashion Week for the spring of 1989. Refusing to take bows at his live shows, Margiela began avoiding pictures and began handling all media via fax, with interviews taken collectively by the entire design team and correspondence signed with "we." Many in the fashion media contended that the anonymity was a publicity stunt, although Maison Martin Margiela asserted that Margiela's anonymity was a reaction to an overly commercialized fashion industry and a genuine attempt to return the focus of fashion to the clothing, and not the personas behind it. The press dubbed Margiela the Greta Garbo of fashion as a result, a reference to Garbo's similar avoidance of the spotlight, and in 2008 the New York Times called Margiela "fashion's invisible man."

=== Purchase by OTB ===
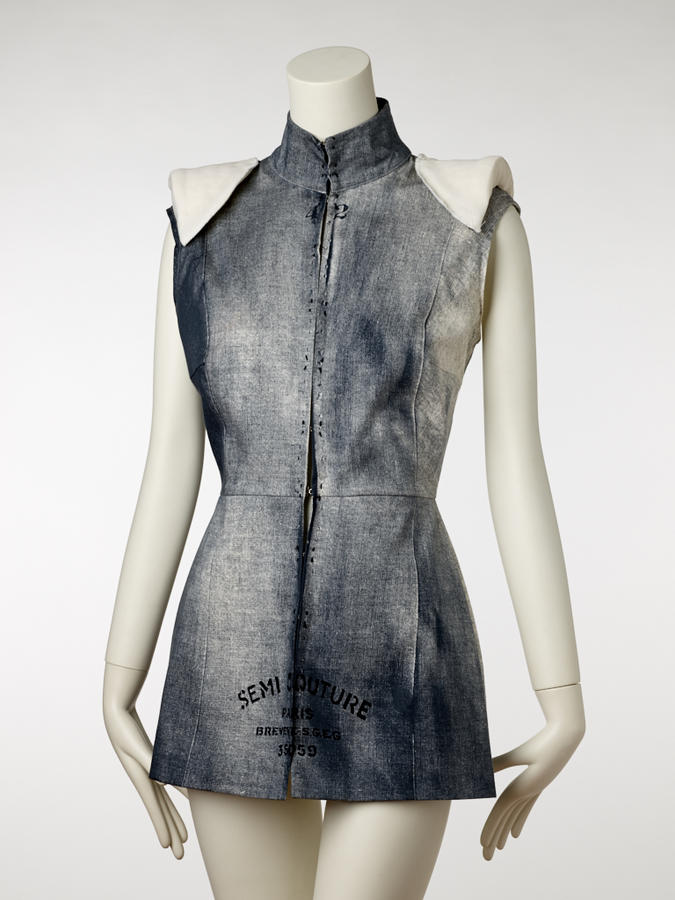
Maison Margiela 1999 screen-printed cotton dress

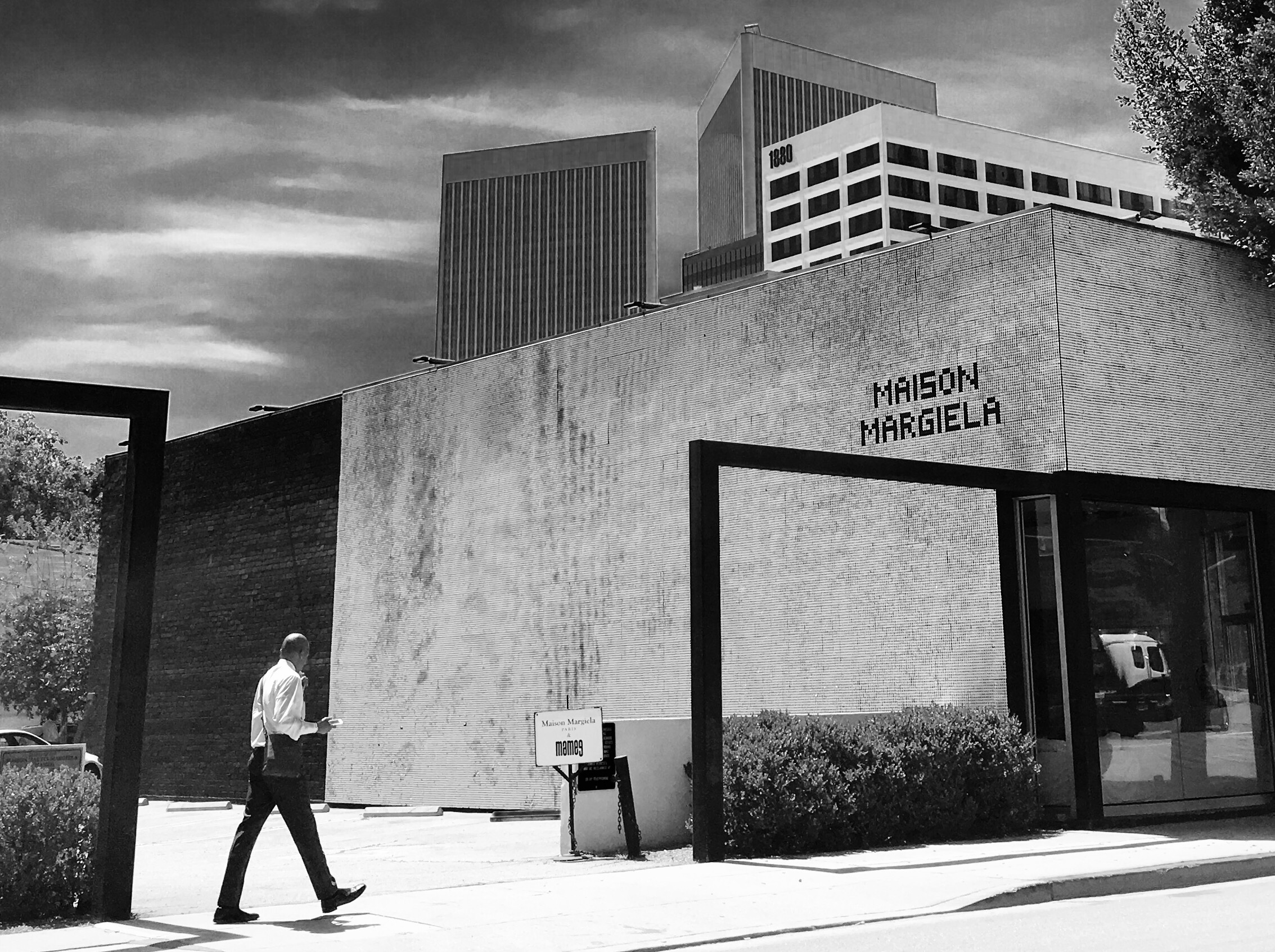
Maison Margiela boutique in Beverly Hills, California

In 1994 the New York Times commented on the company's influence by writing that its "made-over flea-market clothes put an end to the conspicuous consumption [of the fashion industry] of the 1980s." That year Maison Martin Margiela debuted its first period pieces. In 1998, Maison Martin Margiela debuted a menswear collection, known as line 10. Maison Martin Margiela oversaw creative direction of womenswear for the French design house Hermès from 1997 until 2003, with the design team working under Hermès chairman Jean-Louis Dumas.

In 2002, Maison Martin Margiela was acquired by the OTB Group, a holding company led by Renzo Rosso, also owner of the Italian fashion label Diesel. In December 2004, Maison Martin Margiela moved into a new headquarters in an eighteenth-century convent in Paris' 11th arrondissement. The interior of the headquarters and furniture were painted entirely white with emulsion, creating an aged look. In addition to the white surroundings, employees all wear "blouse blanche", white coats traditionally worn by couture craftsmen. The white coats are both a nod to history and aesthetics, as well as an equalizer, as all employees wear them, regardless of title. Maison Martin Margiela debuted its first haute couture collection in 2006. By the summer of 2008 there were 14 Margiela boutiques.

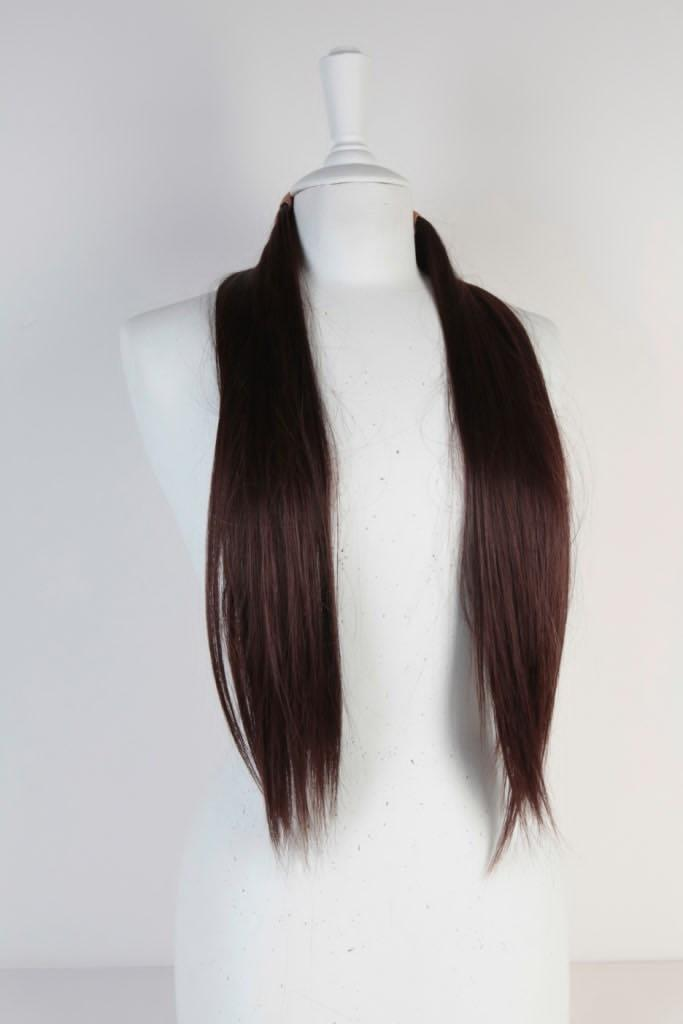
Maison Martin Margiela hair scarf made in 2009 for the 20th anniversary of the house. VOKSUK archives(personal collection) Anonymous design team, 2009–2014

In October 2009, it was announced that Martin Margiela had resigned as creative director of Maison Martin Margiela, to varied speculation about the reasons. Following Margiela's departure, the anonymous design team continued to design the label, with no single creative director in place. It later became public that future Balenciaga designer Demna was appointed to the womenswear design team shortly after Margiela's departure, but worked anonymously at the time. CEO Giovanni Pungetti stated that "we want to stay avant-garde, and provocative, but without a new creative director. It's a challenge. We know this. We will probably make mistakes, but the most important thing is to learn from them."

The company expanded its homewares and interior design business in 2010, and in July 2011 the house designed several concept hotel suites for La Maison Champs-Élysées in Paris.

Maison Margiela debuted a capsule collection for H&M in 2012, consisting largely of reissued pieces from the Margiela archives.

By the fall of 2014, sources estimated that the brand generated about $126 million in annual revenues, with around 50 directly owned stores.

=== John Galliano, 2014–2024 ===
In October 2014 it was announced that John Galliano would take the position of creative director, after having previously served in that position at Givenchy, Dior, and his eponymous line, John Galliano. As reported by the Guardian, Margiela's only directions to the new director were "make it your own." Giving rare interviews in the interim, Galliano presented his debut collection for Maison Margiela in January 2015, to broadly positive reviews. Coinciding with Galliano's debut collection, it was revealed that the house had dropped "Martin" from its name, in favor of "Maison Margiela." A spokesperson for Maison Margiela said that the name change "represented an evolution of the house." With Galliano focusing on the haute couture element of the company, by the end of 2015 revenues were up 30%.

In 2017, Maison Margiela collaborated with outerwear maker Mackintosh to create two exclusive trench coat designs for its spring 2018 men's wear collection, including a white version.

=== Glenn Martens, 2025–current ===
Glenn Martens was appointed in January 2025, taking over John Galliano after his 10-year run, making him the house's third creative director. Since 2020, Martens has been creative director at Diesel, also owned by OTB Group. Before he started working with Diesel, Martens worked as first assistant to Y/Project creative director and founder Yohan Serfaty. After Serfaty died in April 2013, his business partner Gilles Elalouf convinced Martens to take the helm of the label.

American singer Miley Cyrus starred in the brand's Fall 2025 campaign. She is noted to be the first celebrity endorser of the fashion house.

== Timeline ==
- Martin Margiela – 1988 to October 2009
- Anonymous – October 2009 to October 2014
- John Galliano – October 2014 to December 2024
- Glenn Martens – January 2025 to current

== Stores ==
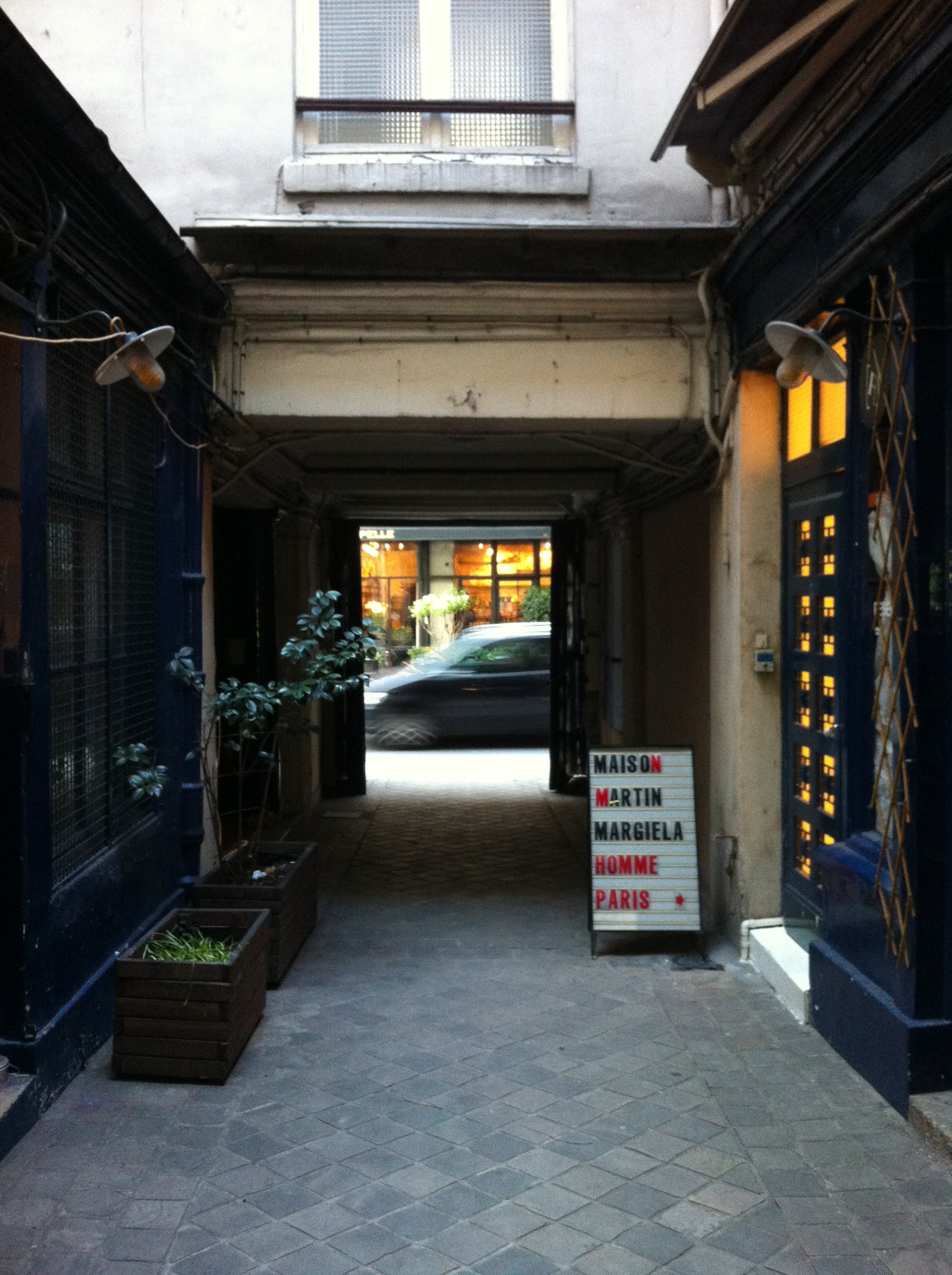
A Maison Martin Margiela store in Paris, France, 2012

Prior to the brand's acquisition by OTB Group in 2002, its stores were not listed in the phone directory, and Margiela's name did not appear outside the shops. By the summer of 2008 there were 14 Margiela boutiques operating internationally, with expansion in Dubai, Hong Kong, Moscow and Munich taking place over the subsequent six months. In late 2009 the brand opened a "pop-up store" at the Art Basel Miami Beach art fair. The number of standalone stores had grown to 17 by 2010, with 21 "shop-in-shops" internationally. As of 2017, Maison Margiela has stores in countries such as France, the United Kingdom, Belgium, China, Germany, Hong Kong, Italy, Japan, South Korea, Taiwan, the United States, and Thailand. In February 2025, the first concession store for Mexico was opened inside Palacio de Hierro department store in Mexico City.

== Maison Margiela Numbers ==
Maison Margiela's numbers, from 0 through 23, are a system used to categorize and identify different products. Each number corresponds to a specific collection or category, and the circled number on a garment's label indicates which collection it belongs to. The system began in 1997 and has remained a key part of the brand's identity.

The number '0' is used for artisanal garments. The meanings for the remaining numbers are as follows:

1. Women's Collection (introduced in 1988)
2. Creative collaborations (introduced in 2025)
3. Fragrances (introduced in 2010)
4. Women's garderobe (introduced in Spring-Summer 2004)
5. Unassigned
6. MM6
7. Unassigned
8. Eyewear (introduced in Spring-Summer 2008)
9. Unassigned
10. Men's Collection (introduced in Spring-Summer 1999)
11. Accessories (introduced in 2005)
12. Fine jewellery (introduced in 2008)
13. Objects and publications
14. Men's Wardrobe (introduced in Spring-Summer 2004)
15. Margiela x 3 Suisses (introduced in 1999)
16. Unassigned
17. Unassigned
18. Unassigned
19. Unassigned
20. Used between 2009 and 2014, when the creative director remained anonymous.
21. Unassigned
22. Footwear (female introduced in 1998; male introduced in 2008) and Replica line (introduced in 1994)
23. Unassigned

== Other activities ==
The house produces both artisanal collections and ready-to-wear collections, with the former inspiring the designs of the latter. With formal allegiance to no particular fashion movement, Maison Margiela's designs are famous for deconstructionist traits such as exposed seams, being oversized and upcycling garments. Other deconstructionist tactics Maison Margiela has utilized include using traditional fabric linings as the outer layers of garments, and the label's 1988 debut womenswear collection included what The Independent described as "a leather butcher's apron reworked into a seductive evening gown," and an old tulle dress worked into several tailored jackets. Other work with unconventional materials has included clothes fashioned of plastic carrier bags and wire coat hangers, trouser suits made from 1970s upholstery fabrics, tops made with leather gloves, and jewelry made of colored ice such that clothes are dyed as the jewelry melts.

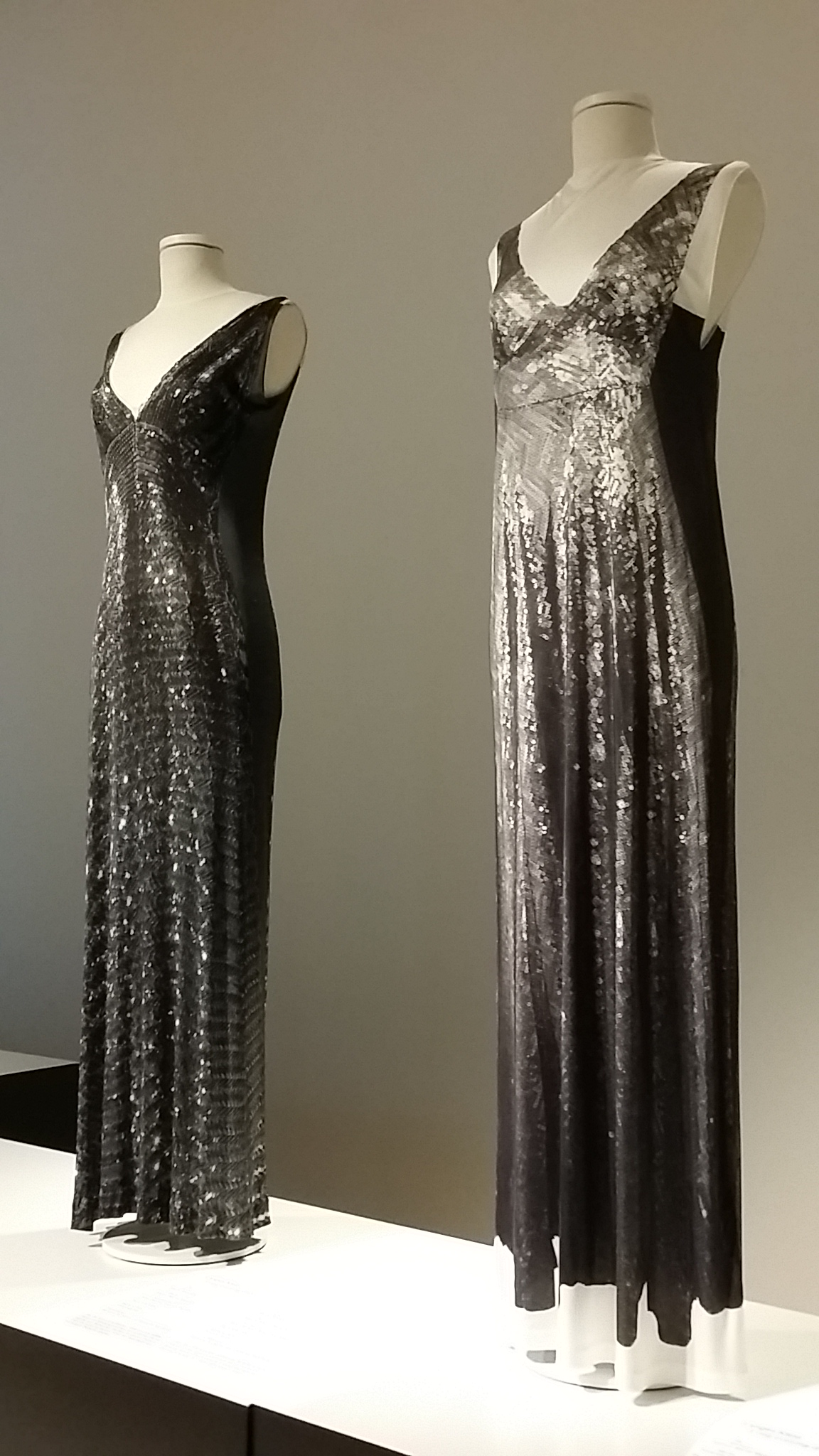
Trompe-l'œil print jersey dresses by Maison Martin Margiela, Spring/Summer 1996 (left) and 2012 collaboration reissue (right)

In 1994 Maison Margiela debuted its first period pieces, with a line of "complete reproductions," after building its previous collection entirely from its archives. Maison Margiela debuted a menswear collection in 1998, known as line 10.

Martin Margiela was creative director for womenswear of the French design house Hermès from 1997 until 2003, with the Maison Martin Margiela team's designs for Hermès unveiled twice a year in Hermes' rue St-Honoré store. The Independent called the collections "understated," with both "loose-fitting masculine tailoring" and "black crêpe evening dresses," among other items. New York Magazine in turn described the designs as "quiet explorations of luxury that focused on classic clothes with subtle but masterful twists."

=== Diffusion line ===
Launched in 1997, MM6 is a diffusion line for the label. MM6 is aimed at the contemporary fashion market as opposed to the avant garde high fashion positioning of mainline Maison Margiela. As of 2023, MM6 is still showing runway collections during Milan Fashion Week.

=== Footwear ===
First shown in 1989 and introduced in 1992, one of the company's more recognized pieces is the Tabi boot, an interpretation of the traditional split Japanese tabi sock which separates the large toe. The company collaborated with Converse on shoe designs in 2013.

=== Accessories ===
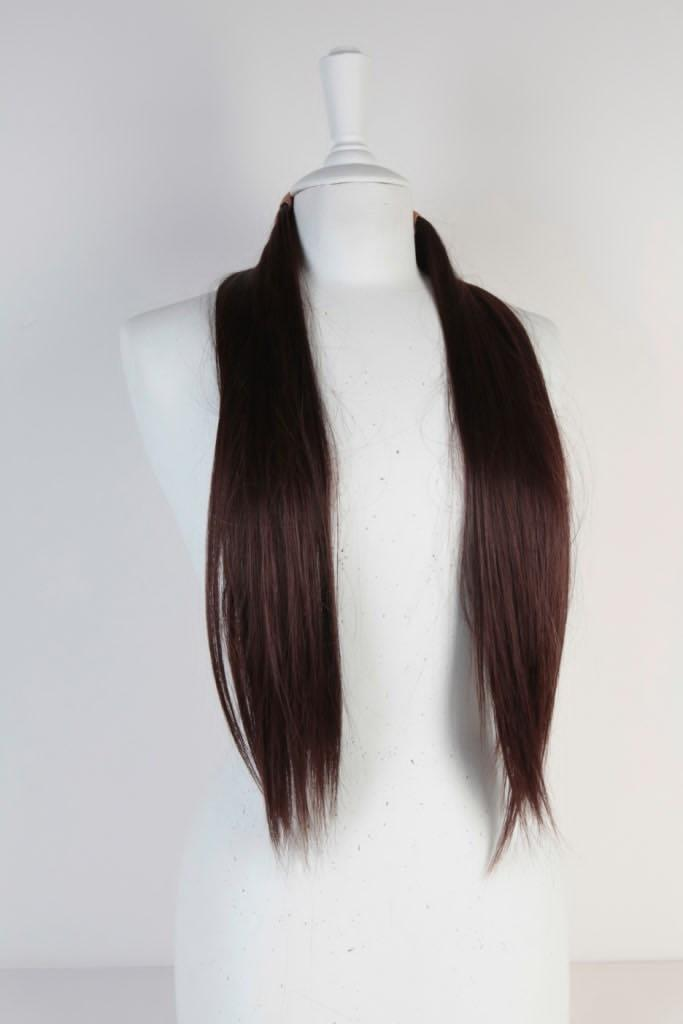
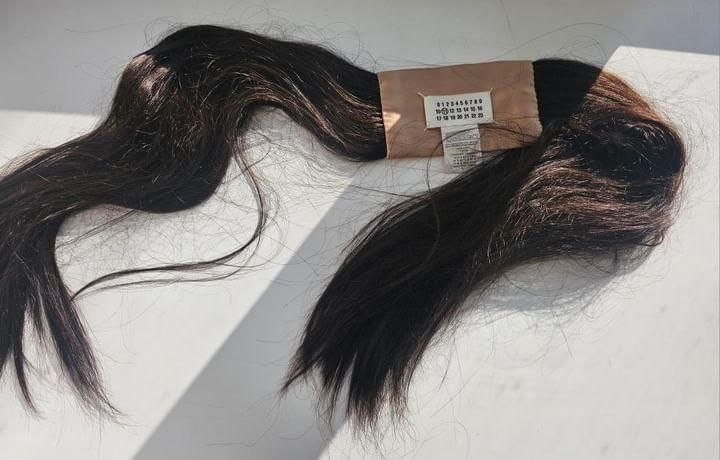
Maison Martin Margiela hair scarf made in 2009 for the 20th anniversary of the house

In November 2008, Maison Margiela launched a small jewelry and eyewear collection, including its first pair of sunglasses, described as "an impenetrable black band that wraps right around the face." The brand also collaborated with Swarovski on a jewelry collection in 2013.

=== Fragrances ===
Maison Margiela's first fragrance was created in collaboration with L'Oreal, debuting in 2009. In 2018, the house's Mutiny fragrance was launched; Nose Dominique Ropion took six years to come up with a fragrance that reflects Galliano's vision of the Maison Margiela women. Willow Smith, Teddy Quinlivan, Hanne Gaby Odiele, Sasha Lane, Princess Nokia and Molly Bair were chosen as "Mutinist" ambassadors, representing the diversity and individuality of the fragrance. In 2024, Maison Margiela extended its Replica fragrance collection with vegetable garden notes.

== Live shows ==
Maison Margiela is known for showcasing collections in atypical settings and manners, with The New York Times describing the shows as "alternately electrifying or humorous or sexy or just plain weird." According to New York Magazine, early shows were "perhaps more like art happenings than the thematic and operatic productions '80s Paris fashion is known for," as well as "radically personal and humanistic expressions about clothes [at a time] when fashion otherwise seemed estranged from everyday realities." Maison Margiela's runway shows are notable in that the models' faces are often obscured by hoods, fabric or long hair, in an attempt to direct attention to the clothes and away from the models themselves. In 1989 Maison Margiela staged a collection on a playground in the outskirts of Paris. With local children interacting with the models in an unrehearsed way and a first-come, first-served seating arrangement, according to Business of Fashion, "the critics loathed it. The industry loved it." Continuing to stage catwalks in unusual places, in spring 1992 a show in an abandoned Paris metro station featured models walking down staircases lined with candles, and according to The Independent, other settings have included round dining tables arranged in neglected warehouses, stairwells of old town houses, and disused subway cars.

Although the house has a reputation for avoiding booking celebrity models, for spring of 1993 models such as Cecilia Chancellor and Kate Moss showcased "minimalism paired with Victoriana." 1993 also saw a show with models weaving among a brass band on the runway, and in 1994 the label staged a collection based on what Barbie's wardrobe would look like full size. Models sat amongst the audience in 1995, and on another occasion, in 1997 the company used a map to invite the fashion press to a street corner in France, and then had the models and a Belgian brass band showcase the newest collection after disembarking from an AEC Routemaster bus. Vogue also related that "one show challenged editors and buyers to seat themselves according to their perceived importance, while another saw models wheeled out on trolleys." According to Vogue, for two seasons in 1998 the label made do without live models, in one case instead using marionettes by Jane How.

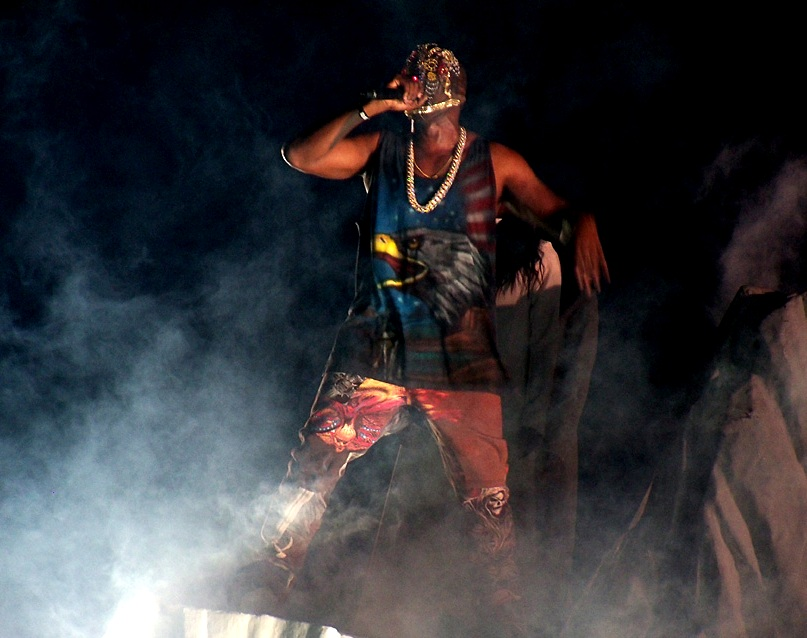
Kanye West wearing a mask and wardrobe by Maison Margiela on his 2013 Yeezus tour

Maison Martin Margiela was invited to show their first haute couture collection in Paris by The Chamber Syndicale in May 2006. The house then held its 20th anniversary show in September 2008 in Paris, featuring a catwalk with a walking birthday cake and "an oom-pah band surrounded by Margiela's lab-coated assistants." Clothing was described as "coats made of synthetic wigs, bodysuits that fused parts of trench coats and tuxedo jackets, and mirrored tights made to look like disco balls." The house designed Kanye West's tour wardrobe in 2013 for his Yeezus tour.

The spring show of 2014 "melded sweet, pioneer styles like floral house dresses with edgier fare like nude bodysuits and oversize Willy Wonka sunglasses." In early 2015 the house premiered its first two collections with Galliano as head designer, initially the brand's "artisanal" collection. The second collection comprised 30 outfits including neon accessories, "Mary-Jane shoes and fake-fur slippers, short skirts, long coats, patent finishes." Galliano upheld house tradition by not taking a post-show bow, although he was in attendance at the shows. The July 2016 show by the house featured items such as military coats, a parachute dress, neon face paint, and 19th-century garments. In September 2016, Maison Margiela partnered with Barneys New York for its fall windows on Madison Avenue, creating four vignettes to reflect the house's recent artisans and ready-to-wear collections.

The spring summer 2024 couture presentation has been praised by critics. The collection was inspired by the work of Hungarian-French photographer Brassaï, and focused on an aesthetic of the night-time underbelly of Paris with themes of corsetry, beadwork, and 1930s inspired silhouettes. For the show, Galliano collaborated with makeup artist Pat McGrath to achieve a moonlit porcelain doll effect for the models (which was later released as a cosmetic line by the brand). Gwendoline Christie closed the show in a fit and flare white latex dress, one of several mid or plus size models in the presentation. In his review for WWD, Miles Socha says the collection "will surely be remembered in history books, collected by museums, pored over by design students" and emphasizes its "litany of new techniques developed over the last year" re-focusing couture on its research and development origins.

=== Retrospectives and exhibits ===
The Fashion Museum Province of Antwerp (MoMu) held a retrospective on the label's work in 2008, moving the exhibit to Somerset House in London two years later. In 2017, MoMu showcased the 12 collections the label had produced while Margiela was appointed by Jean-Louis Dumas to work with Hermès.

=== Documentaries ===
In early 2015 filmmaker Alison Chernick released The Artist is Absent, a short biopic on Martin Margiela that launched at the Tribeca Film Festival. In October 2017, director Menna Laura Meijer released We Margiela through the Dutch production company Mint Film Office. The documentary retrospectively explores the early days of the house and features interviews with members of the original Maison Margiela team, including the house's co-founder Jenny Meirens , Director of Communications Patrick Scallon and Designer Lutz Huelle. In November 2019, director Reiner Holzemer premiered the documentary Martin Margiela: In His Own Words. Co-produced by Aminata and Holzemer (who had previously worked on a documentary by Dries Van Noten), it was called "the definitive study of this elusive, technically gifted designer" in Hollywood Reporter. He notably explained his withdrawal from the public eye and his desire to remain a designer, rather than "a creative director who directs his assistants". As with most media related to the designer, only Margiela's hands are shown on screen.

== See also ==
- List of fashion designers § Belgium
- List of grands couturiers
