= Millennium Promise =

American non-profit organization

- Millennium Promise Alliance
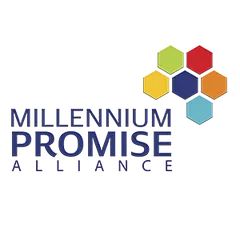
- Abbreviation: MPA
- Location: United States
- Website: www.millenniumpromise.org

Millennium Promise, officially Millennium Promise Alliance, Inc. (MPA), is an American non-profit organization incorporated under the laws of the State of Delaware, with the stated goal of ending extreme poverty within a human lifetime. It is a founding partner of the organization, Malaria No More, and its flagship initiative is the Millennium Villages Project. This project led to progress toward the United Nations' Millennium Development Goals (MDGs).

== History ==
Millennium Promise was co-founded in 2005 by the international economist and director of The Earth Institute at Columbia University, Jeffrey Sachs, and philanthropist and Wall Street leader Ray Chambers.

In September 2006, the financier and philanthropist George Soros pledged $50 million to Millennium Promise to fund 33 Millennium Villages.

On May 30, 2010, United Nations secretary-general Ban Ki-moon visited the Millennium Village of Mwandama in Malawi, congratulating the people of the village and pronouncing it a success, "a case study in what is possible, even in the poorest places in the world."

== Description and governance ==
The project focuses on food, health care, education, and infrastructure. The organization is headquartered in New York, with regional headquarters in Bamako, Mali and Nairobi, Kenya, and national affiliates in Canada, the United Kingdom, and the Netherlands.

Economist John W. McArthur served as the organization's chief executive officer from 2008 to 2011. Co-founder Jeffrey Sachs has served as president and chief strategist of the organization, and is listed by Millennium Promise Alliance as its chief executive officer.

The organization engages partners from the private and public sectors, national governments, and individuals. Among the Millennium Promise MDG Global Leaders are Tommy Hilfiger; the founder of Diesel, Renzo Rosso; and Senegalese musician and UNICEF ambassador Youssou N'Dour.
