= Viktor & Rolf =

Dutch fashion house

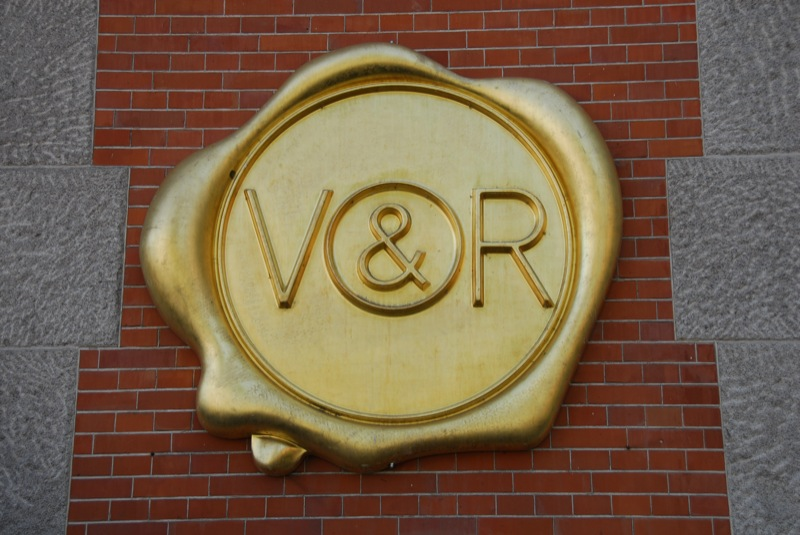
- Logo on the wall of the headquarters
- Type: Private company
- Industry: Fashion
- Founded: 1993; 33 years ago
- Headquarters: Amsterdam, Netherlands
- Key people: Viktor Horsting & Rolf Snoeren (co-founders & co-creative directors)
- Products: Apparel and accessories
- Parent: OTB Group
- Website: www.viktor-rolf.com

Viktor & Rolf is a Dutch avant-garde luxury fashion house founded in 1993 by Viktor Horsting (born 1969, Geldrop) and Rolf Snoeren (born 1969, Dongen). Viktor & Rolf have designed both haute couture and ready-to-wear collections. The duo is renowned for their avant-garde designs, which rely heavily on theatrical and performative fashion runways. As of June 2026, the brand is fully owned by OTB Group.

== Background ==
Viktor Horsting and Rolf Snoeren first met while studying at the Arnhem Academy of Art and Design in 1988. Upon graduation in 1992, the pair began working together and relocated to Paris. Initially, Viktor & Rolf were shunned by the fashion industry, however, the designers were received well by the art world. Art institutions such as the Groninger Museum began to acquire garments from the designers.

Early collections featured dramatic silhouettes, unconventional materials, and conceptual themes that would become characteristic of their work. In 2000, Viktor & Rolf launched their company logo featuring a wax seal with the monogram V&R, and began producing ready-to-wear collections.

In 2003, the designers launched a menswear collection which co-existed alongside the women's line until 2009. Viktor & Rolf also created perfumes; the female fragrances Flowerbomb (2004) and Bonbon (2014), along and the male fragrances Antidote (2006) and Spicebomb (2012). In 2015, the designers halted ready-to-wear production and returned once more to haute couture citing that they wanted to "explore the limits of wearability, function and form." In 2022, Viktor & Rolf organized its first retrospective in China.

== Collections ==
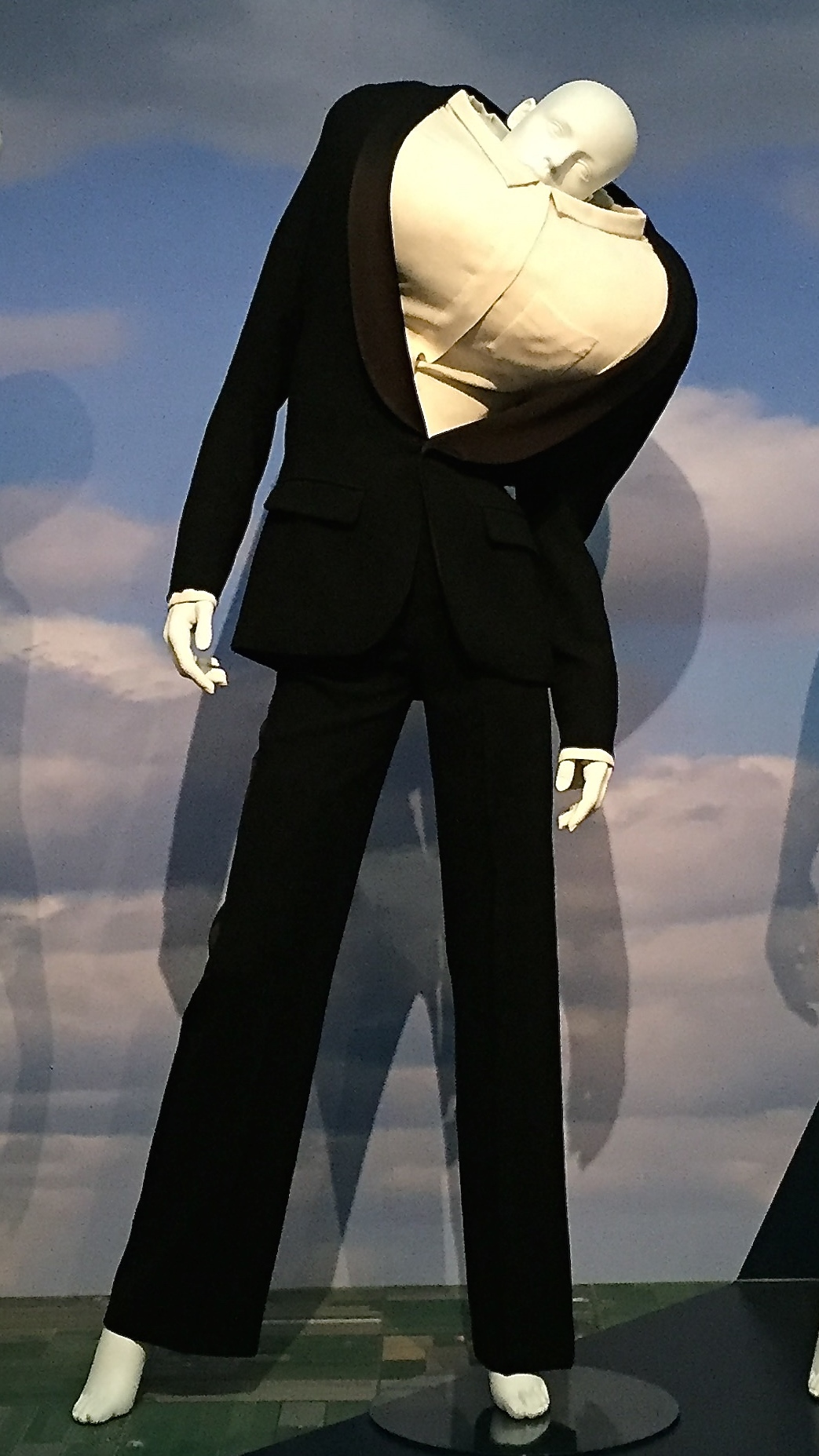
1998 'Atomic Bomb' collection

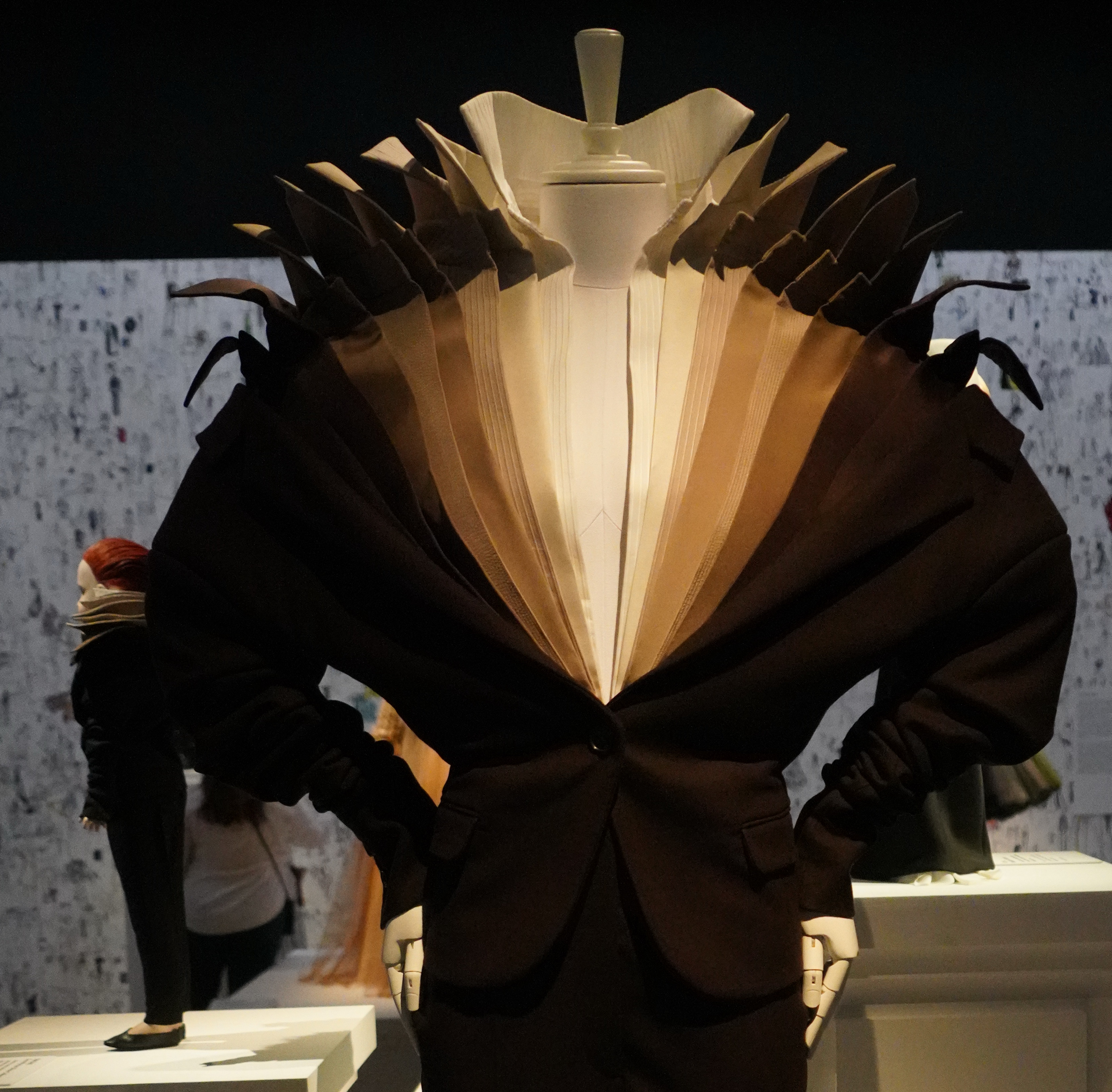
2003 'Monsieur' collection

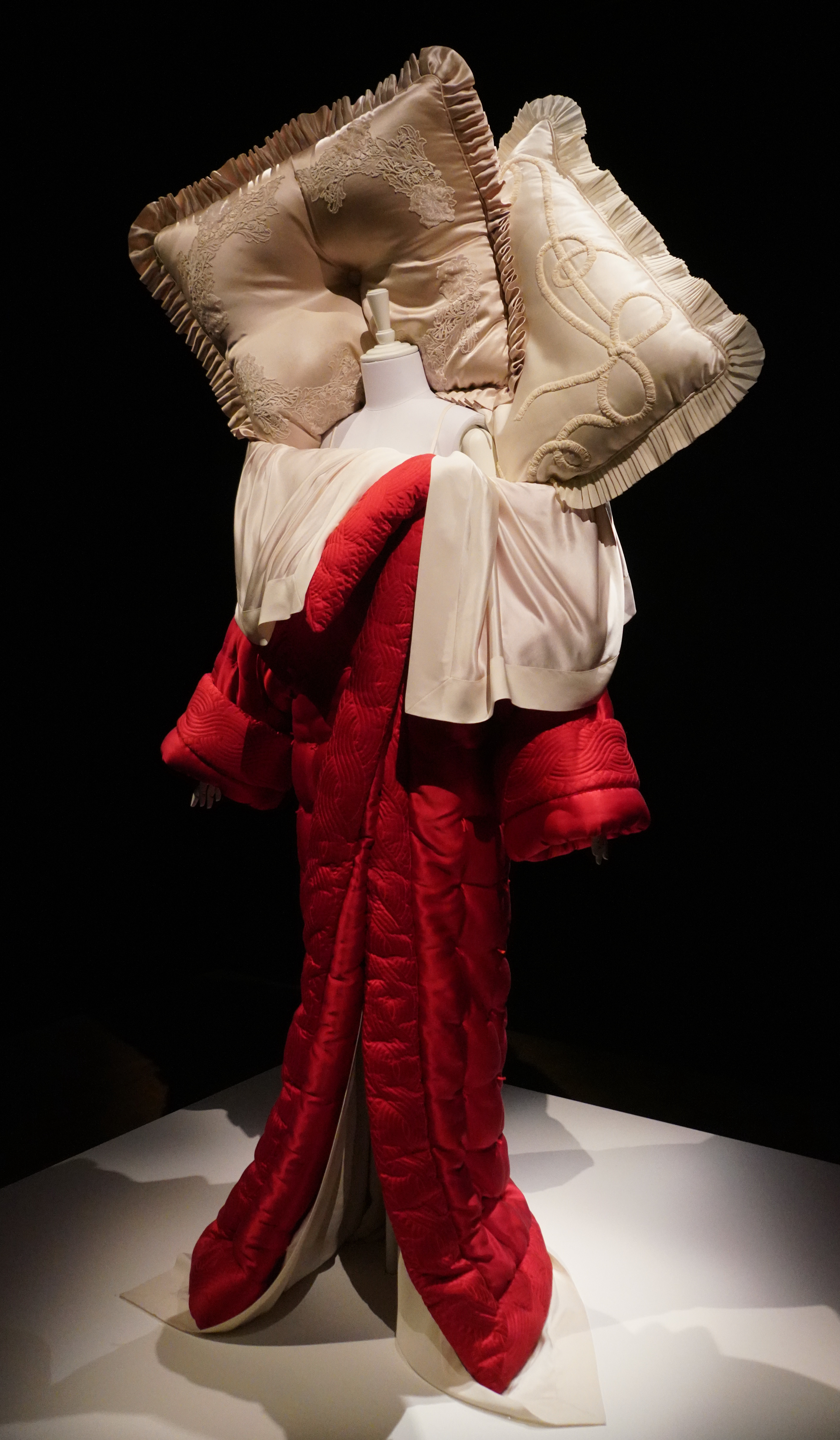
2005 'Bedtime Story' collection

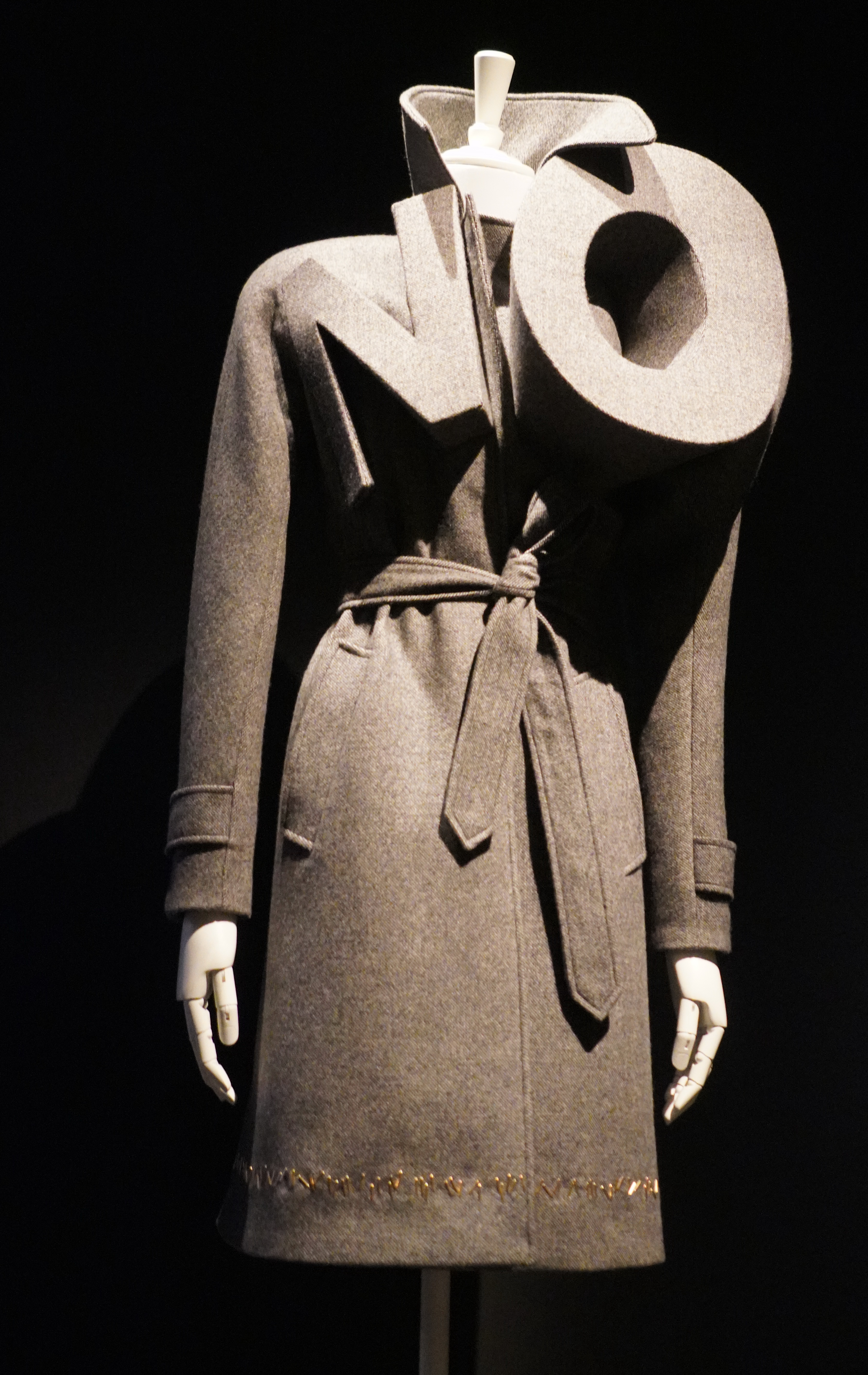
2008–09 'NO' collection

The fashion company has created both ready-to-wear and haute couture fashion collections. Below is a comprehensive anthology of all Viktor and Rolf collections.

Early haute couture collections

- Hyeres (1993)
- L'Hiver de l'Amour (1994)
- L'Apparence du Vide (1995)
- Launch (1996)
- First Couture (Spring/Summer 1998)
- Atomic Bomb (Autumn/Winter 1998–99)
- Black Light (Spring/Summer 1999)
- Russian Doll (Autumn/Winter 1999–00)
- Bells (Autumn/Winter 2000–01)

Ready-to-wear

- Stars & Stripes (Autumn/Winter 2000–01)
- There's no Business Like Show Business (Spring/Summer 2001)
- Black Hole (Autumn/Winter 2001–02) (Content warning: blackface)
- White (Spring/Summer 2002)
- Long Live the Immaterial (Bluescreen) (Autumn/Winter 2002–03)
- Flowers (Spring/Summer 2003)
- One Woman Show (Autumn/Winter 2003–04)
- 'Monsieur' (Autumn/Winter 2003–4)
- The Red Shoes (Spring/Summer 2004)
- The Hunt (Autumn/Winter 2004–05)
- 'Monsieur' (Autumn/Winter 2004–05)
- Flowerbomb (Spring/Summer 2005)
- 'Monsieur' (Spring/Summer 2005)
- Bedtime Story (Autumn/Winter 2005–06)
- 'Monsieur' (Autumn/Winter 2005–06)
- Upside Down (Spring/Summer 2006)
- 'Monsieur' (Spring/Summer 2006)
- Silver (Autumn/Winter 2006–07)
- 'Monsieur' (Autumn/Winter 2006–07)
- Ballroom (Spring/Summer 2007)
- 'Monsieur' (Spring/Summer 2007)
- The Fashion Show (Autumn/Winter 2007–08)
- 'Monsieur' (Autumn/Winter 2007–08)
- Harlequin (Spring/Summer 2008)
- 'Monsieur' (Spring/Summer 2008)
- NO (Autumn/Winter 2008–09)
- 'Monsieur' (Autumn 2008)
- 'Monsieur' (Spring 2009)
- Shalom (Spring/Summer 2009)
- Cutting Edge Couture (Spring/Summer 2010)
- Glamour Factory (Autumn/Winter 2010–11)

== Return to haute couture ==
After a thirteen-year hiatus from creating haute couture, Viktor & Rolf re-established themselves as with the Zen Garden (Autumn/Winter 2013–14) collection. Below are small summaries of some of Viktor & Rolf's haute couture designs.

Bonbon (Spring/Summer 2014)

Interested in exploring the point at which skin and clothing meet, Viktor & Rolf created a collection of latex couture pieces titled Bonbon. The fluid materiality of latex (not commonly used in high fashion) juxtaposed with the light colour palette resulted in an almost ethereal and angelic collection. The pieces were created seamlessly and designed to appear as a second skin. To depict an illusion of depth stylistic birds, bows and ribbons were hand painted onto the latex, in a trompe-l'œil technique. The Bonbon collection was modelled by ballerinas en-pointe.

Red Carpet Dressing (Autumn/Winter 2014–15)

Described as a "surrealist commentary", Viktor & Rolf's collection Red Carpet Dressing explored the reciprocal relationship between celebrity and designer. The duo humorously exploited the concept of dressing for the red carpet by designing 22 couture gowns from red carpet. Elegant high fashion pieces were made from unassuming rough and rigid carpet. The designs incorporated animal skin patterns made from the same material and sewn onto the base. The monochromatic palette gave primary focus to the design and pattern making techniques, which recalled primitive knotted constructions and classic couture styles. Viktor & Rolf again used the haute couture platform to comment on the fashion industry and contemporary culture.

Van Gogh Girls (Spring/Summer 2015)

The ideas of momentum and growth were of central importance in the 2015 haute couture collection. To visualise the central concept, Viktor & Rolf adopted the quintessential summer outfit of a floral sundress, flip flops and a straw dress, and transformed the imagery into three-dimensional sculptural pieces. The collection escalated from a simplistic baby doll silhouette into extravagant couture pieces. Floral outlines evolved into three-dimensional fabric flowers, as simple straw hats extended laterally to connect with the pleated dresses. The evocative colours and black graphic outlines present throughout the garment collection were reminiscent of Dutch painter Vincent van Gogh, of whom the collection was aptly named after. Van Gogh Girls is not only an exercise in exaggerating forms and imagery, but additionally showcased the close relationship between artists and fashion designers.

Wearable Art (Autumn/Winter 2015–16)

The fluid link between art and fashion was perhaps most clearly portrayed with the Wearable Art haute couture collection. Twenty models, dressed in simple denim artist's smocks, walked the runway draped in what appeared to be oil paintings. Designed to mimic the imagery of classical paintings with gilded frames, the garments included cloaks, dresses and skirts. Through painterly illusion and construction, Viktor & Rolf transformed framed paintings into haute couture garments, and then back to paintings. During the display, the designers removed five of the garments from the models and hung them back on a white wall. The collection provoked public conversation as to the definition of art mediums.

Vagabonds (Autumn/Winter 2016–17)

Vagabonds entwined recycling with haute couture. Focused on conscious designing, Viktor & Rolf manifested a collection made entirely from discarded materials from their atelier. Strips of fabric were braided, offshoots of tulle were sewn together, and buttons were clustered as embellishment. Overall the garments expressed the artistic possibilities of recycling. The collection was described as "a wondrous feat of conflating rag rugs to riches." Whilst still defined as haute couture, Vagabonds was noted to be a more wearable collection from the duo, offering the public a practical display of eco-friendly haute couture.

Boulevard of Broken Dreams (Spring/Summer 2017)

Recalling the message of recycling from the Vagabonds, Boulevard of Broken Dreams pairs contrasting patterned fabric with a fantastical and delicate colour palette. The recycled layers appear almost like shards of glass placed onto Viktor & Rolf's signature exaggerated couture forms. The designers chose to consciously exploit such imperfections, following the Japanese principle of Kintsugi by gilding faults and seams in gold. The aesthetic and intention of the collection was summarised by critic Suzy Menkes: "The patchwork of grandeur was as pretty in its choice of colour as it was in the feminine shapes. And if recycling could be this elegant, maybe it could draw more fashion people to the party."

== Exhibitions ==
Below is a comprehensive list of art exhibitions which have featured the work of Viktor & Rolf. The sheer number is a testament to the artistic value of their garments.

1994

- February–March: L'Hiver de l'Amour - Musée d 'Art Moderne de la Ville de Paris (group exhibition)
- March: Le Cri néerlandais - Institut Néerlandais, Paris (group exhibition)

1995

- October: L'Apparence du Vide - Galerie Patricia Forfmann, Paris
- December–January 1996: Collections - Galerie Analix, Geneva (group exhibition)

1996

- October: Launch - Torch Gallery, Amsterdam

1997

- April–May: Viktor & Rolf: Le Regard noir - Stedelijk Museum Bureau, Amsterdam

1998

- July–September: The First 25 - Colette, Paris (group exhibition)

1999

- April–May: Viktor & Rolf: 21st Century Boys - Aeroplastics Contemporary, Brussels
- April -June: Visions of the Body: Fashion or Invisible Corset - The Kyoto Costume Institute, Japan (group exhibition)
- May: Viktor & Rolf - Visionaire Gallery, New York
- May–June: Creative Time in the Anchorage: Exposing Meaning in Fashion Through Presentation - Brooklyn Bridge Anchorage, New York (group exhibition)
- June- October: Heaven: An Exhibition That Will Break Your Heart - Kunsthalle Düsseldorf, Germany (group exhibition)

2000

- November–March 2001: Viktor & Rolf Haute Couture - Groninger Museum, Groningen

2001

- March–May: Mohri Colour and Space Part 5 (Sayoko) - Kobe Fashion Museum, Japan (group exhibition)
- September–November: YOKOHAMA 2001: International Triennale of Contemporary Art - Japan (group exhibition)

2003

- October–January 2004: Viktor & Rolf par Viktor & Rolf, première décennie - Musée de la Mode et du Textile, Paris

2004

- April–December: Fashion in Colours: Viktor & Rolf & KCI - The Kyoto Costume Institute, Japan
- May–August: Goddess - ModeMuseum, Antwerp, Belgium (group exhibition)
- June–September: Skin Tight: The Sensibility of the Flesh - Museum of Contemporary Art, Chicago (group exhibition)
- September–January 2005: Spectres: When Fashion Turns Back - ModeMuseum, Antwerp, Belgium (group exhibition)
- September–January 2005: Fashination - Moderna Museet, Stockholm (group exhibition)

2005

- September–December: Dutch at the Edge of Design: Fashion and Textiles from the Netherlands - The Museum at FIT, New York (group exhibition)

2006

- November–March 2007: Skin + Bones: Parallel Practices in Fashion and Architecture - The Museum of Contemporary Art, Los Angeles (group exhibition)
- November–March 2007: Fashion Show: Paris Collections 2006 - Museum of Fine Arts, Boston (group exhibition)

2007

- May–September: Picture House - Belsay Hall, Northumberland, England (group exhibition)

2008

- June–September: The House of Viktor & Rolf - Barbican Art Gallery, London, England
- November–February 2009: The House of Viktor & Rolf - Centraal Museum, Utrecht, The Netherlands

2016

- October–February 2017: Viktor & Rolf Fashion Artists - National Gallery of Victoria, Australia

2018

- May–September: Viktor & Rolf Fashion Artists 25 Years - Kunsthal, Rotterdam, The Netherlands

2024

- February–October: Viktor & Rolf Fashion Statements - Kunsthalle, Munich, Germany

2025

- October–February 2026: Viktor & Rolf Fashion Statements - High Museum of Art, Atlanta, Georgia, United States

== Literature ==
- Thierry-Maxime Loriot (Editor): Viktor&Rolf. Fashion Statements. Hirmer Publishers, Munich 2024, ISBN 978-3-7774-4306-5.
