= Jil Sander (company) =

Luxury fashion house

Jil Sander S.p.A.
- Type: Subsidiary
- Industry: Fashion
- Founded: 1968; 58 years ago in Hamburg, Germany
- Founder: Jil Sander
- Headquarters: Foro Buonaparte, 71, Milan, Italy
- Number of locations: 42 (2022)
- Area served: Worldwide
- Key people: Ubaldo Minelli (CEO); Simone Bellotti (Creative Director)
- Products: Clothing; fashion accessories; footwear; jewelry
- Revenue: €148 million (2023)
- Net income: €7.5 million (2023)
- Number of employees: 208 (2025)
- Parent: OTB Group
- Website: www.jilsander.com

Jil Sander S.p.A. is a luxury fashion house founded in 1968 in Hamburg, Germany, and currently headquartered in Milan, Italy. Founded by Jil Sander, the brand is best known for its minimalist and clean designs. The brand was acquired by Prada in 1999 and Sander subsequently departed her eponymous label due to creative differences. After several changes of ownership, the Jil Sander brand was acquired by Italian fashion group OTB in March 2021. Simone Bellotti is the creative director.

== History ==
=== Beginnings ===
Founded by Jil Sander in 1968, the company's first womenswear collection was launched in 1973, menswear followed in 1997. Her first collection – there was just one of each item – sold out in a week. From 1974, she sold her own collections alongside fashion by Sonia Rykiel, Thierry Mugler and others. The first fragrance – Woman Pure – was launched in 1979. During those years, all of the brand's boutiques were designed by New York architect Michael Gabellini.

In the 1980s, Sander presented her collections at the Milan fashion shows. With fashion alone, the company made a turnover of 20 million marks in 1981.

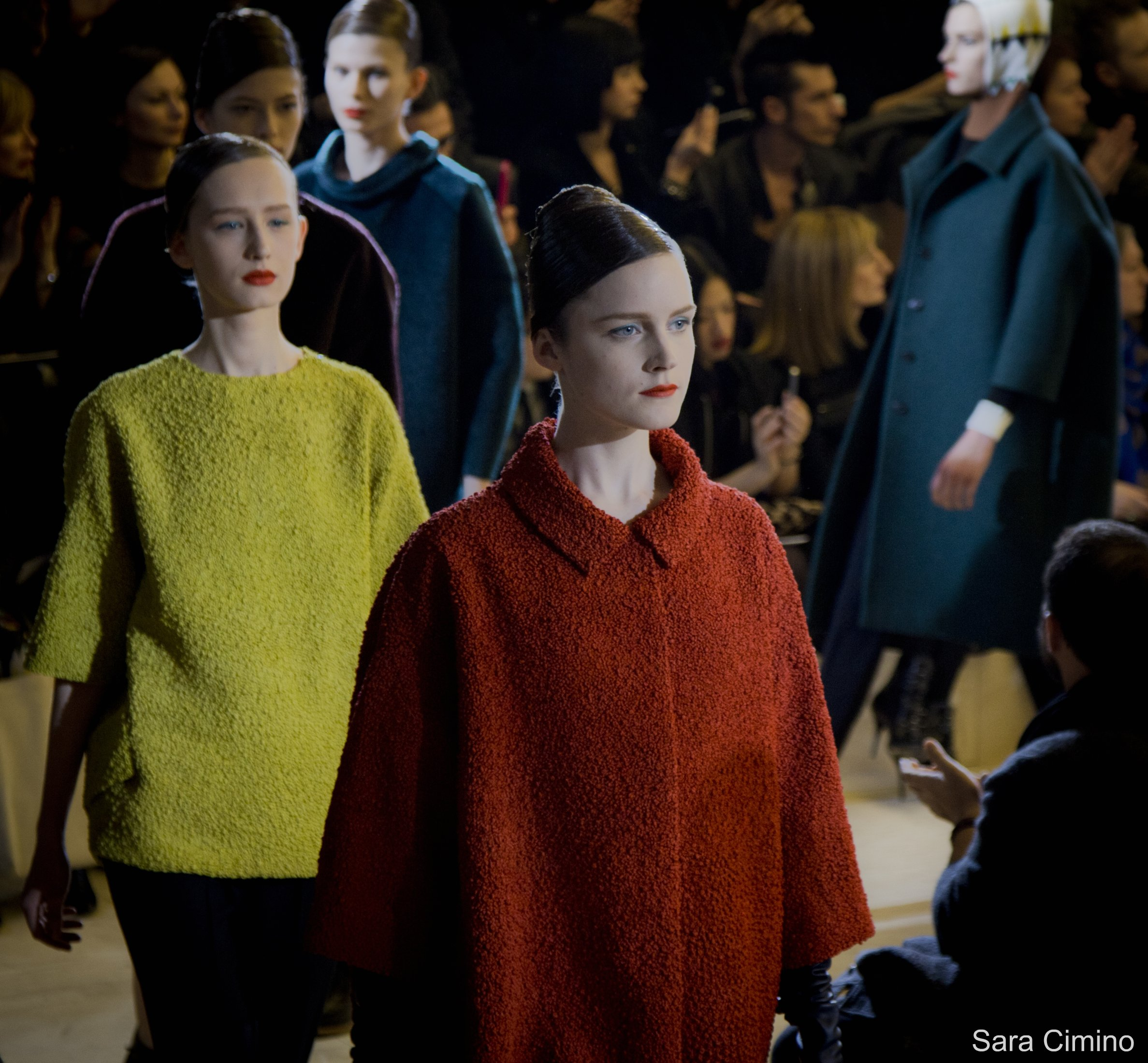
Jil Sander Fall 2011 Ready-to-Wear, designed by Raf Simons

The company went public and was listed on the Frankfurt stock exchange in 1989; in the process, Sander herself sold a one-third ownership for $56 million while retaining control over the voting shares. Also in 1989, the company established a manufacturing site in Ellerau, near Hamburg.

The 1990s are considered to be the heyday of the Jil Sander brand. Flagship stores were built in Tokyo, Hong Kong and Taipei, and Sander worked on the design in collaboration with Gabellini and other architects. In 1993 a flagship store was added on Avenue Montaigne in Paris. In 1995, the company moved into two 18th-century palazzi on Harvestehuder Weg, overlooking the Außenalster lake in the north of Hamburg; they were redesigned by Gabellini.

In 1992, the designer Roberto Menichetti was hired as Sander's assistant for the women's collection. The footwear collaboration between Jil Sander and Puma from 1996 onwards goes back to his and Sanders' designs – the designer sneaker King was first presented in 1996, the Easy Rider model followed in 1997. It was the first collaboration between a luxury designer and a sports equipment brand. In 1997, Jil Sander launched the men's fashion collection; Menichetti also contributed to these designs. Men's fashion soon contributed around 20 percent to group sales.

Also in 1997, Jil Sander established Tailor Made, a line of hand-tailored classic suits in luxury fabrics in limited quantities.

=== Prada, 1999–2006 ===
In 1999, Prada Group bought a 75 percent share in the company, for which it reportedly paid more than $100 million. It later increased that stake to 98 percent. At the time, Sander said publicly that she partnered with Prada in large part to expand her brand's accessories business. Six months later, Sander departed the company as chairwoman and creative director, and nearly all the design and production staff left as well. The company, which had been profitable before the sale to Prada, lost money in 2001 and 2002.

In 2003, Sander returned to the brand as creative director, for a six-year contract. As part of the deal, she got to sit on Prada’s strategic committee, alongside Bertelli and Miuccia Prada. She was also given the option to join Jil Sander’s board at a later stage. However she decided to leave again 18 months later.

A restructuring that began in 2004 led Prada to predict that the Jil Sander brand would break even by 2006. The brand's only German production site in Ellerau – with a total of around 160 employees – was closed in 2005. All production has since been taking place in Italy. The company’s net loss further widened to 29.6 million euros ($37 million) in 2004 and to 37.3 million euros ($46.3 million) in 2005.

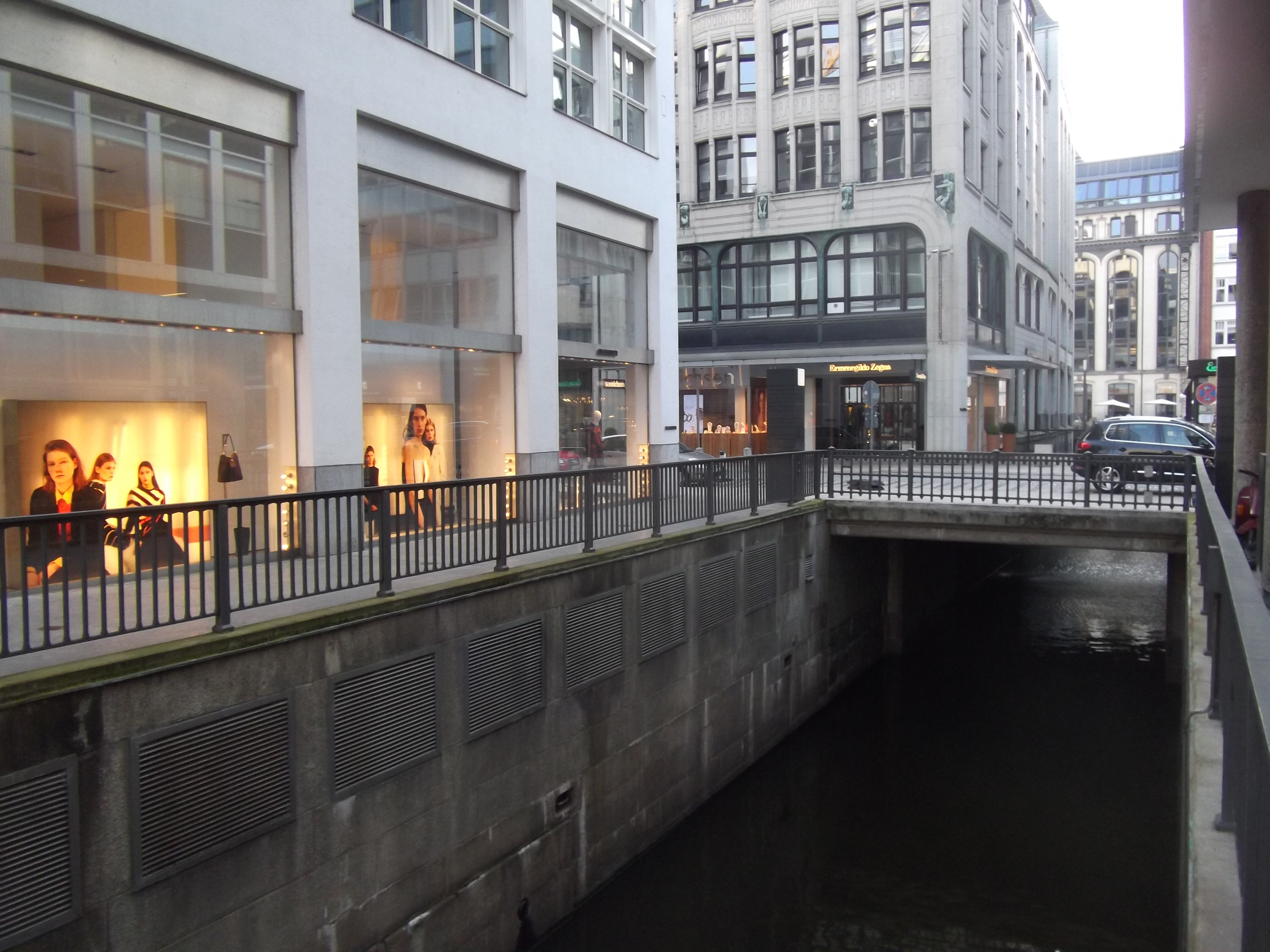
Jil Sander store at Hamburg's Neuer Wall

In February 2005, the long-standing in-house design team and Sander’s longtime stylist, Joe McKenna, presented the first Jil Sander collection since the founder’s departure. In May 2005, it was announced that Raf Simons had become creative director for the women's and men's collection. Simons wanted to "strip it down so there was nothing that wasn't necessary". Suzy Menkes, the principal fashion writer for the International Herald Tribune, said that some items in the collection "made exceptional pieces" but overall it "was not as strong as before." The Fall/Winter collection, however, received accolades from IHT. Simons' first women’s collection was shown at Milan Fashion Week in 2006. The collection received a positive review from the Evening Standard and the Los Angeles Times.

=== Change Capital, 2006–2009 ===
In 2006, Luc Vandevelde's London-based private equity firm Change Capital Partners LLP bought the company from Prada for an undisclosed sum thought to be about £68 million. It also gave equity in the company to Simons, along with two top managers.

At that point, the Telegraph reported that the company was in better shape financially. Prada CEO Patrizio Bertelli said: "As we focus on the development of the Prada and Miu Miu brands, I am certain that Change Capital Partners will be able to provide the necessary investment to further grow the Jil Sander business." Raf Simons remained creative director at Jil Sander. Under Change Capital ownership, the company moved from negative ebitda of €12.9 million in 2005 to positive ebitda of €6.1 million in 2007.

In July 2008, Jil Sander finalized its squeeze-out, initially set in motion in 2006, and fully delisted a remaining two percent stake from the Frankfurt Stock Exchange.

=== Onward Holdings, 2008–2021 ===
In September 2008, Onward Holdings Co. Ltd. (TYO: 8016), a Japanese multi-brand fashion conglomerate, and its European subsidiary GIBO' CO. S.p.A. acquired unlisted Violine S.à r.l., a Luxembourg-based holding firm that had the Jil Sander brand under its wing, for 167 million euros (US$244 million).

In 2019, Jil Sander collaborated with Mackintosh on a series of functional outerwear pieces and accessories.

=== OTB Group, 2021–present ===
In March 2021, OTB Group acquired 100 percent of the Jil Sander brand.

In 2022, Jil Sander launched Indulgence, a new line of apparel and accessories characterized by high-end fabrics, plush textures and buttery colors.

In early 2025, Luke and Lucy Meier departed from the brand. Simone Bellotti, formerly creative director of Swiss brand Bally, was appointed as their successor.

== Leadership ==
=== Designers ===
- Jil Sander: 1968–2000, 2003–2004, 2012–2013
- Milan Vukmirovic: 2000–2003
- Raf Simons: 2005–2012
- Pauric Sweeney: 2005–2012
- Rodolfo Paglialunga: 2014–2017
- Lucie Meier and Luke Meier: 2017–2025
- Simone Bellotti: 2025-Present

=== CEOs ===
- Roland Böhler: 1993–1998
- Aurelio Giorgini: 1998–1999
- Patrizio Bertelli: 1999–2004
- Gian Giacomo Ferraris: 2004–2009
- Alessandro Cremonesi: 2009–2015
- Alessandra Bettari: 2015–2018
- Axel Keller: 2018–2023
- Ubaldo Minelli: 2021–2023
- Luca Lo Curzio: 2023–2025
- Serge Brunschwig: 2025

== Locations ==
As of August 2022, Jil Sander operates 42 stores in Europe, Asia, and North America, including in London, Frankfurt, Milan, Paris, Zurich, Tokyo, Seoul, Shanghai, and New York City.

== Other projects ==
=== Fragrances ===
Jil Sander's first women's fragrance, Jil Sander Pure, was launched in 1977 and its first men's perfume, Jil Sander Man Pure, in 1981., both as part of a licensing agreement with Coty; it was most recently renewed in 2023. Jil Sander launched a women’s Sun fragrance in 1989, No. 4 which was launched in 1991. In 1997, Quest International developed the Jil fragrance. Each scent was concocted with Sander’s creative input before she left her namesake brand in 2004.

Later fragrances have included Jil Sander Sport (2005), aimed at 18 to 25-year-olds, and Jil Sander Style (2006), a scent created to appeal to women who are 30 and older.

=== Innerwear and beachwear ===
In 2008, Jil Sander entered into a licensing agreement with Albisetti to produce innerwear and beachwear.

=== Eyewear ===
From the early 1990s, French luxury eyewear designer Alain Mikli held the license for Jil Sander Eyes. From 1999 to 2003, Jil Sander's then-owner Prada partnered with De Rigo on a joint venture company, EID (International Eyewear Distribution), to produce and distribute eyewear for all Prada Group brands, including Jil Sander. In 2008, the brand entered into a licensing agreement with Marchon Eyewear to produce and distribute men’s and women’s eyewear.

=== Jewelry ===
After a first capsule fine jewelry collection in 2009, Jil Sander entered into a licensing agreement with Damiani to create a complete line of jewelry and watches.

=== Diffusion line ===
Jil Sander Navy, a diffusion line priced 30% to 40% lower than the Jil Sander collection, was launched in 2011. Its design was not overseen by Raf Simons, but by a separate design team. Garments included outerwear, light jackets, and knitwear as well as t-shirts, blouses, and dresses.

The first deliveries were for spring 2011, with an initial focus on the U.S. and Japan. The first Jil Sander Navy flagship opened in Milan in 2013, as well as a temporary store in London. The line was discontinued in 2019.

=== Electronics ===
In 2011, Jil Sander and LG Electronics launched the fashion brand's first-ever mobile phone. Conceived by Jil Sander Corporate Design, another LG Electronics smartphone was launched in 2022.

=== Footwear ===
As part of Birkenstock's 1774 project, a collaborative collection that saw designs created by Valentino, Proenza Schouler and Rick Owens, Jil Sander teamed up with the footwear brand in 2022 on four shoe designs.

=== Sportswear ===
In 2021, Jil Sander collaborated with outdoors brand Arc'teryx on a collection of men’s, women’s and unisex clothing.

== Campaigns ==
Jil Sander has been working with several high-profile photographers for its advertisement campaigns, including Francesco Scavullo (1977), Nick Knight (1991–1993), Peter Lindbergh (1993–1994), Craig McDean (1995–1996, 2001), Bruce Weber (1997), David Sims (1997–1999, 2003–2006), Mario Sorrenti (2000), Richard Avedon (2002–2003), Mikael Jansson (2003), Wim Wenders (2018) and Joel Meyerowitz (2021). For its "Sunlight" fragrance, the brand's campaign featured actress Susan Sarandon in 2018.

== Recognition ==
- 2011 – Design Museum's Brit Insurance Design Award

== See also ==
- Jil Sander
- Raf Simons
- Prada
- OTB Group
