= OTB Group =

Italian clothing company

OTB, S.p.A.

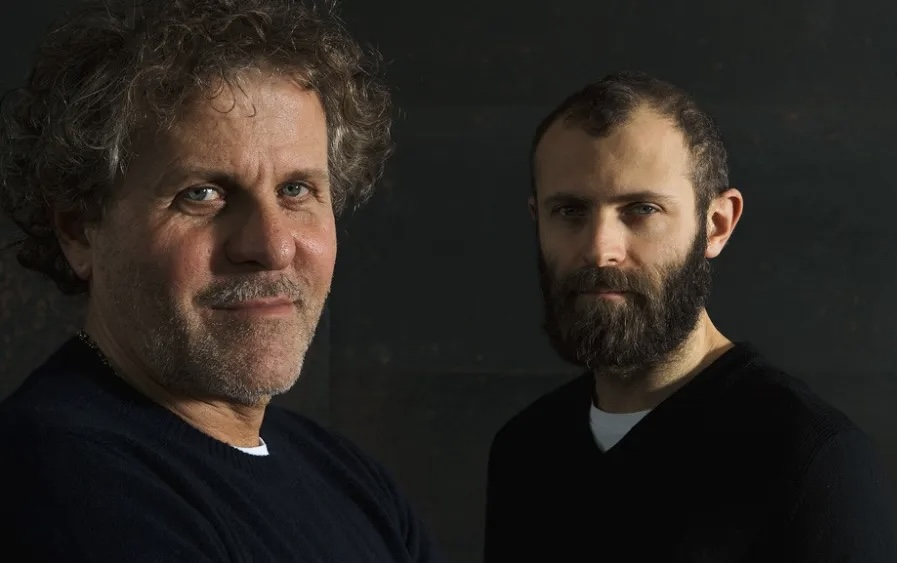
- Renzo Rosso and Stefano Rosso
- Type: Private (S.p.A.)
- Industry: Luxury goods
- Founded: 2002; 24 years ago
- Founder: Renzo Rosso
- Headquarters: Via dell'Industria, 2, Breganze, Veneto, Italy
- Area served: Worldwide
- Key people: Renzo Rosso (President); Ubaldo Minelli (CEO); Stefano Rosso (Director)
- Products: Clothing; fashion accessories; jewelry; footwear
- Revenue: 1,9 mlrd € (2023)
- Number of employees: Over 7,000 (2023)
- Subsidiaries: List of subsidiaries
- Website: www.otb.net

Only The Brave, S.p.A., commonly known as OTB Group, is an Italian multinational holding company specializing in luxury goods, headquartered in Breganze. The company was founded in 2002 by Renzo Rosso as a holding company for Diesel and future acquisitions of fashion houses. OTB Group is the parent company of brands including Diesel, Maison Margiela, Marni, Jil Sander, and Viktor & Rolf.

The company recorded an annual revenue of €1.9 billion in 2023. Ubaldo Minelli has been CEO of the company since 2017.

== History ==
After acquiring complete control of Diesel in 1985, OTB's founder Renzo Rosso continued to grow his portfolio through the acquisition of Staff International, a fashion production, logistics, and marketing company, in October 2000.

In 2002, OTB Group was founded as a holding company to invest in fashion designers and companies that lacked financial stability, but produced designs deemed creative and promising by Rosso. Then, the company acquired French luxury fashion house Maison Margiela in 2002 and Dutch luxury fashion house Viktor & Rolf in 2008.

In 2011, Brave Kid was founded as a subsidiary of OTB Group that specializes in the product development, production, and distribution of licensed premium children's clothing and accessories. Brave Kid holds license agreements with Diesel, John Galliano, Dsquared², Marni, N21 and Trussardi.

Italian luxury fashion house Marni was acquired in 2012, followed by Amiri in 2019 and Jil Sander in 2021. In 2023, OTB Group acquired a majority stake in leather goods manufacturer Frassineti, long-term supplier of the Jil Sander brand.

In June 2025, OTB announced the creation of its own legal entity in Mexico City as the first step in its expansion plan in the region.

== Subsidiaries ==
A list of OTB Group's wholly or partially owned brands and subsidiaries.

- AMIRI
- Brave Kid
- Diesel
- Jil Sander
- Maison Margiela
- Marni
- Staff International
- Viktor & Rolf

== Philanthropy ==
OTB Foundation is a not-for-profit organization founded in 2008 to contribute to the sustainable development of less advantaged areas.

In 2009, Rosso, together with Millennium Promise, started supporting the development of the Only The Brave Millennium Village, in Dioro, Mali. Established in 2005, Millennium Promise supports the Millennium Development Goals to halve extreme poverty by 2015. In February 2012, Rosso was invited by the Permanent Mission of Italy to the United Nations to host a press conference at The United Nations together with Jeffrey Sachs, Director of The Earth Institute at Columbia University and Special Advisor to The United Nations' Secretary-General Ban Ki-moon, about the progress of Millennium Promise and OTB Foundation.

The Brave Circle Fund was created in 2012 to help people hit by the 2012 earthquakes in Emilia-Romagna, Italy. A personal endowment of 5 million euros was dedicated to setting up a micro-credit program for local people and small and medium enterprises who need help in reconstructing homes and businesses, but who normally would not have access to the traditional banking system because of their lack of guarantees. At launch, Rosso said the aim was to fund "700–800 projects with €5,000–50,000 each."

In June 2008, Rosso donated HK$2,000,000 (or US$250,000) to the Special Relief Fund established by UNICEF for children affected by the 2008 Sichuan earthquake.
