= Devon Halfnight LeFlufy =

- Born: 26 March 1984 (age 42); Vancouver, British Columbia, Canada
- Education: Royal Academy of Fine Arts Antwerp
- Occupation: fashion designer

Devon Halfnight LeFlufy (born 26 March 1984) is a Canadian fashion designer based in Antwerp, Belgium. He studied at the Royal Academy of Fine Arts, graduating with both a BA and MA in Fashion Design. LeFlufy trained under Maria Cornejo and Walter Van Beirendonck before starting his namesake label in 2013. The designer is highly regarded for his innovation and punctilious details inside accessible silhouettes and familiar idioms.

== Design partnerships ==
Beyond showing his namesake collections in New York City as a part of MADE Fashion Week, LeFlufy has collaborated on design partnerships with Opening Ceremony and Theo eyewear.

== Exhibitions ==
• "Experimental Skirts" 2010, group show MoMu Fashion Museum, Belgium

• "Happy Birthday Dear Academy" 2013, MoMu Fashion Museum, Belgium

• "Andy Warhol: Life, Death and Beauty" 2014, BAM Museum, Belgium

• "The Belgians. An Unexpected Fashion Story" 2015, group show, Bozar, Belgium

== Fellowship and grants ==
• Fondation De la Mode de Montreal, Study Abroad Bursary 2009 - 2013

• Flanders Fashion Institute (FFI), Fashion Fuel Bursary 2014 - 2016

== Honours ==
• "Louis Prize" BA collection 2012, Belgium

• "International Jury Prize" MA collection, granted by the Antwerp Six 2013, Belgium

• Finalist for the "H&M Design Award 2014", Sweden

• Shortlisted for the "LVMH Prize 2015", France
