= AIREI =

American fashion brand

- Type: Fashion house
- Industry: Fashion
- Founded: 2021
- Founder: Drew Curry
- Headquarters: Los Angeles, California, United States
- Products: Ready-to-wear, footwear
- Website: airei.store

AIREI is an American fashion brand based in Los Angeles, California, founded by designer Drew Curry in 2021. The brand is known for deconstructed silhouettes and hand-finished construction in its ready-to-wear collections.

AIREI was a semi-finalist for the LVMH Prize in 2022 and has presented collections at Paris Fashion Week as part of the official calendar of the Fédération de la Haute Couture et de la Mode.

== History ==
Drew Curry founded AIREI in 2021 in Los Angeles. Curry has cited the political and technical history of cotton as an influence on the brand's aesthetic. The brand's name is derived from a Greek word meaning both "to lift up" and "to cut away." Curry grew up in Tacoma, Washington and later relocated to Los Angeles, where he established AIREI.

AIREI's debut collection for Autumn/Winter 2021 was carried exclusively at Dover Street Market locations in Ginza, New York, and Los Angeles.

In January 2022, Curry presented his Fall/Winter 2022 collection, titled "Plight," at Dover Street Market Paris's 35/37 cultural hub during Paris Fashion Week Men's. Later that year, AIREI was named one of twenty semi-finalists for the 2022 LVMH Prize for Young Fashion Designers.

In January 2023, AIREI presented its Fall/Winter 2023 collection at Paris Fashion Week as part of the official FHCM calendar, marking its official inclusion on the schedule.

== Design philosophy ==
AIREI's work centers on deconstruction and reconstruction techniques intended to reflect themes of fragility, impermanence, and transformation. Garments frequently feature visible mending, exposed threads, distressed fabrics, and handcrafted details that highlight the process of creation. Curry has stated that single threads left hanging from garments represent mending and healing.

The brand's collections are produced in Los Angeles and often incorporate handwoven khadi fabrics sourced from India. Collections have been accompanied by installations, sound design, and ceremonial presentations.

== Collaborations ==
=== ASICS ===
In 2024, AIREI collaborated with ASICS on a three-part series of the GEL-Quantum Kinetic sneaker. The collaboration featured khadi gauze wraps across the sneaker's upper, which were burned away during production to reveal the shoe beneath. The three limited-edition releases were sold exclusively at Dover Street Market locations in Los Angeles, New York, and Ginza throughout 2024.

== Distribution ==
AIREI is stocked internationally at retailers including Dover Street Market, SSENSE, Farfetch, and H.Lorenzo. The brand's garments have been worn publicly by musicians Kendrick Lamar, Bad Bunny, Billie Eilish, and SZA, as well as NBA player Shai Gilgeous-Alexander.
