= Peter Ekkart =

Belgian dancer and dance teacher

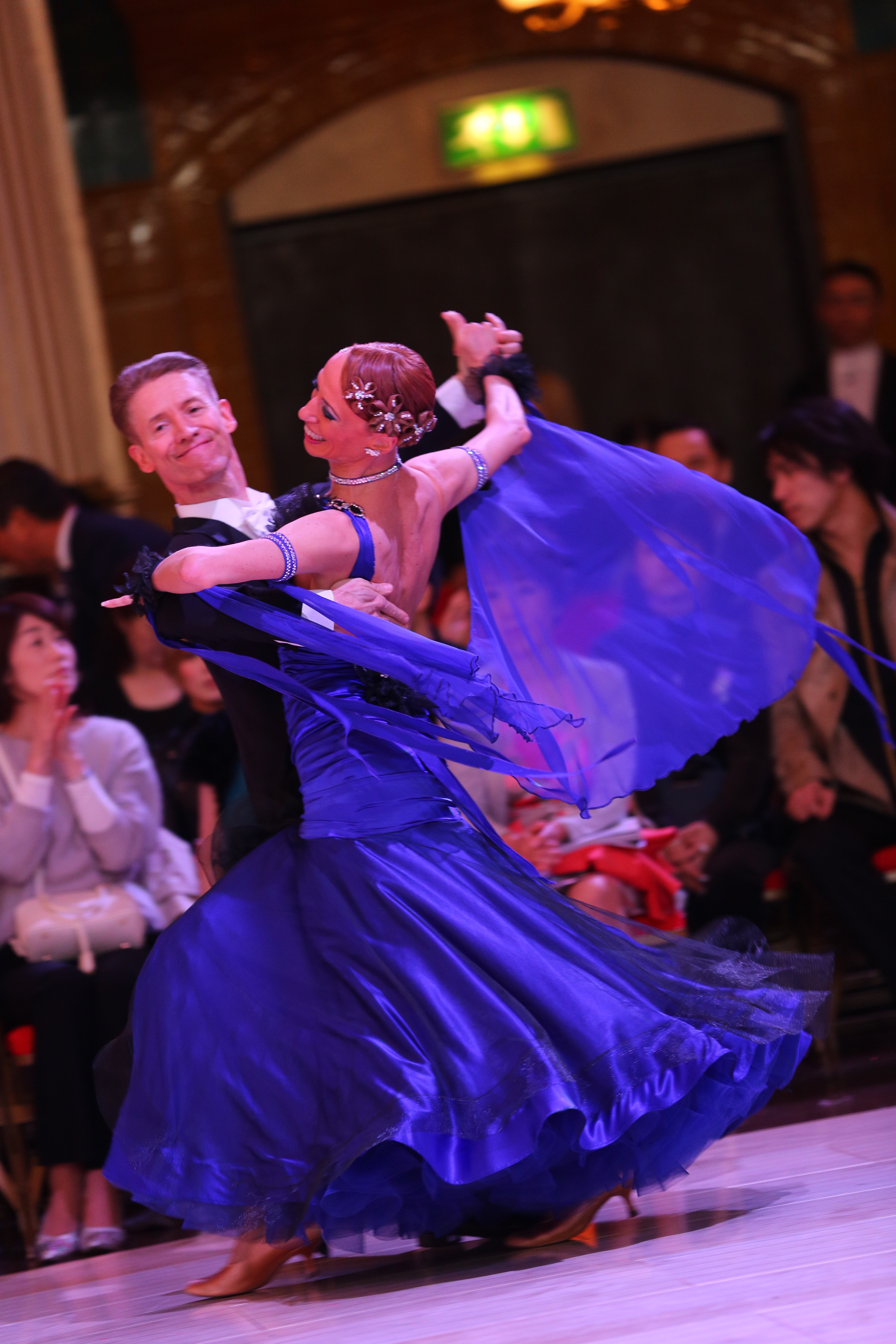
Peter & Ellen Ekkart, during the Blackpool Festival in 2015

Peter Ekkart is a professional dancer, dance teacher, dance school owner, and choreographer. His work focuses on Ballroom and Latin Dance. Ekkart, along with wife and mother run a dancing school in Belgium.

== Early life ==
Ekkart was born in Wilrijk (Antwerp), Belgium, the oldest of three brothers. From age 15 to 16, he was a free student at the full-time ballet school in Antwerp, the Stedelijk Instituut voor Ballet. The intense training over these years at the ballet school gave him the basics he needed for his further career in Latin and Ballroom Dancing.

His parents started a dancing school the year before he was born. At first, a small studio, but by 1978 they had built a complex with two ballrooms and a studio.

== Dance business ==
After the death of his father in 1981, Peter Ekkart took over the business with his mother Mar, and two brothers Tom and Wim. In 1998, he became the owner and added a third ballroom and an upstairs studio to the existing building. The ballrooms were divided by mobile soundproof walls and could be transformed into one big ballroom of more than 1,000 square meters (10,500 square feet). He married his wife Ellen in 2001, who joined the business as a full-time teacher. Ekkart organized high-level dance seminars, congresses, national and international championships, and regular dance events, often accompanied by live music.

In November 2016, the school was moved to Lint.

During this time, Peter and Ellen were asked to start teaching in the US by three different organizations. They moved in 2017 to the US to investigate.

In August 2018 they bought a Fred Astaire dance Studio at Clear Lake, Houston, USA. Due to constant growth, the studio was moved to a new location 2 years later. In 2023, they bought the rights to open a second Fred Astaire studio in downtown Houston at the Bellaire region.

== Dancing career ==
He danced in the Belgian Amateur Federation with two different partners, over a period of three years. With the official professional organization Buldo in 1987, he graduated as a Fellow in the disciplines of ballroom and Latin dancing.

He started dancing with his partner and former wife. They won seven Champion titles from 1989 to 1991 (Latin, All around, Showdance Ballroom, and showdance Latin). They made the final in the European Professional All-Round Championship in Berlin in 1988 and finished in fifth place with their tango (ninth place over ten dances). In 1991, the couple split up and divorced. From then on, Ekkart focused on coaching, judging, and teaching.

In 2008, he made his competitive comeback with Ellen Saey, now his wife. They started dancing after working together on the television show Sterren op de Dansvloer, the Belgian equivalent of Dancing with the Stars (US) or Strictly Come Dancing (UK).

They won seven Belgian Professional Championships in a row, in the Ballroom style, from 2010 to 2016.

== Vice World-Champion 2016 ==
Peter & Ellen Ekkart took part in all World and European Championships from 2008. They danced at the Kremlin in Russia, South Korea, Japan, Canada, the US, and almost all European countries. In June 2015, they were placed third at the World Professional Ballroom Championships 40+, in Cervia, Italy. One year later, they moved to second place, and became the vice-world Professional Ballroom Champions 40+.

They took lessons with coaches all over the world: Marcus & Karen Hilton, Christopher Hawkins, Joanna Bolton, Eldar Dzafarov, Anna Sazhina, Tony & Amanda Dokman, Water Laird, among others.

After visiting the United States in 2015, they started learning American smooth dancing. They introduced this style in Belgium at the National Professional Belgian Congress in May 2016.

== Dancing With the Stars ==
He worked on the Flemish version of Dancing With The Stars.

VTM (Flemish Commercial television) bought the rights for this program in Belgium and started the Flemish version of the show Sterren Op de Dansvloer in 2006.

== Choreographer ==
In the period between his two active dancing careers, Ekkart started working on choreography. He founded Café Latino a formation team of 25 young Latin dancers. The team won Belgian titles in 1992, 1996, and 1998 and danced at the World and European Championships. They finished 13th at the World Championships in Czechia.

In 2006, the Belgian equivalent of Dancing with the Stars (USA) or Strictly Come Dancing (UK) started its first season, and his wife Ellen was one of the participants as a professional dancer. He and his wife choreographed the celebrity participants Sam Gooris, a singer-entertainer, Herbert Flack, an actor, and Nico Mattan, a cyclist.

== Judging and teaching ==
Ekkart is an official examiner for dance teachers in Belgium. He judged the World Professional Showdance Championship in Germany in 1993, and regular national and international championships in Europe. He is an official WDC (World Dance Council) judge, and wrote the Ballroom Dance Technique Translation in Dutch and English.

== Television work and movies ==
- From age 14 to 16, he was selected together with 15 children by the Flemish actor Robert Borremans to participate in a project called Robert Borremans and the Santeboetiek Show. The Flemish National Television Station BRT (now called VRT) cast the group for a weekly program for children: The Wir War Show.
- In 1991, he organized the European 10 dance Championships for professionals in Belgium, which were televised by the Belgian National Television Company (TV1). He produced the show.
- In 1993, Ekkart convinced the National Television Company (TV1) to broadcast the Cinderella Cup. This prestigious event was an international professional competition, the first of this kind held in Belgium. Couples from all over the world danced for a diamond trophy.
- In 2005, the television company Vitaya made a full episode of the series De job van je leven in Ekkart's dancing school showing the introduction of a new hip hop teacher for the school, together with the preparation, tests, interviews and results.
- In July 2005, Ekkart provided dancers for a movie directed by Robert Groslot, in cooperation with Marc Bogaerts.
- 2005: VRT made a television show, Dans Mondial. Ekkart was the professional choreographer for actors Ann Ceurvels and Ronny Daelman.
- From 2006 to 2011, VTM broadcast the Flemish version of Dancing with the Stars (US) or Strictly Come Dancing (UK). Together with his wife Ellen Ekkart, he made the choreography for the partners of Ellen Ekkart: Sam Gooris, Herbert Flack, and Nico Mattan.
- From 2007 to 2009, he coordinated dancers for a stage performance for the television show Zomerhit. He and his wife Ellen Ekkart provided dancers for national artists like Bart Peeters, Clouseau, and international artists such as Sister Sledge, Kim Wilde, and Melanie C from the Spice Girls.
- In 2007, Humo asked Peter Ekkart to form a dance formation for Humo's pop Poll in the Sportpaleis. The whole show was televised on Canvas.
- In that same year, Jan Verheyen was looking for dancers for his movie Vermist, and hired dancers from Ekkart's school.
- In 2014, Frank Focketeyn and Karlijn Sileghem took dance lessons in preparation for the television series Tom & Harry.

== Other projects ==
=== Dancing in prison ===
From 2005 to 2007, the Federal Antwerp Prison asked Ekkart to give dance lessons in the prison to the inmates, and to choreograph a show with the inmates.

=== Walter Van Beirendonck ===
In July 1997, Walter Van Beirendonck, the famous Belgian fashion designer of the Antwerp Six, asked Ekkart to collaborate with his fashion show for his 1998 summer collection in Paris. He needed 70 dancers, dressed in futuric evening costumes, and green gas masks and long green rubber gloves, to dance the final show number for an audience of 3.000 fashion people and reporters. Peter Ekkart did the choreography, coordinated the act, and also participated as a dancer.

=== Wim Vandekeybus ===
For an audition for his show in 2015, Wim Vandekeybus had to choose from 600 dancers coming from all parts of the world. He hired Peter and Ellen Ekkart to give a session in ballroom dancing, so he could see how quickly dancers picked up this style. The fusion of contemporary dance, ballet and ballroom gave a special mix, which Vandekeybus can use in the near future.

== Music ==
=== Danny Wuyts ===
From 1996 to 1998, Ekkart worked together with Danny Wuyts (artist name Bodane). This versatile artist had all the capacities to make a good balance between cost and quality. Ekkart and Wuyts worked together to find the perfect songs, brought in top musicians to play the lead instruments, using Danny's wide voice range for the lead and backing vocals for all the songs, and recorded their first CD. In search of a music distributor, Ekkart found that the company Dancelife was looking for new talent, and was interested in selling a CD especially made for ballroom dancing schools. The CD was an instant hit with the Belgian and Dutch dancing public, and soon also in the international field of dancing. Following this success, three CDs in total were made, the first and second in cooperation with Peter Ekkart, and the third produced only by Danny Wuyts. Today, the music from the albums is still used in major dance competitions worldwide.

After the sell-out of the three CDs, Dancelife put the catalogue on iTunes, where the music is still bought today.

=== Gery's Big Band ===
He worked with an existing band called Gery's Big Band, built around the musician Gery Liekens to develop tracks and music, suitable to support ballroom dancing competitions. After rehearsals and tryouts, Gery's Big Band was ready to play at the official All Round Ballroom Dancing Championships in the early 1990s. Twenty years later, they made contact again, and started working for a revised playlist for competitions. Gery's Big Band now played in 2015 at the Benelux championships.

=== The Ballroom Orchestra ===
Wim Jansegers had the idea of touring the Flemish cultural centers with authentic ballroom music. He looked for professional musicians and singers, and for an advisor in the ballroom dancing world. That contact was soon found, and Peter Ekkart was attracted as a musical advisor, and as the show couple with his wife and partner Ellen Ekkart.

They named the band The Ballroom Orchestra. One of the band members, Peter van Woensel, also participated in the making of the dance music CDs, and Ekkart asked him to join the band.

The show included the participation of the public, where they meet musicians and dancers and interact with each other. The show toured for two years in 2013 and 2014, and played in all major cities in Flanders, the Dutch speaking part of Belgium. The highlight was three concerts in the authentic hall The Roma in Antwerp.

== Personal life ==
Peter Ekkart has two children, Joyce and Mike.

He married Ellen Ekkart-Saey in 2001 and has a son named Idriz.
