= Marina Yee =

Belgian fashion designer (1958–2025)

- Born: 1 April 1958; Temse, Belgium
- Died: 1 November 2025 (aged 67); Antwerp, Belgium
- Education: Royal Academy of Fine Arts (Antwerp)
- Occupations: Fashion designer; artist
- Years active: 1980–2025
- Labels: M.Y. Project (2018–); Marina Yee (2018–)
- Awards: Jury Prize at the Belgian Fashion Awards in 2024

Marina Mariette Alfons Yee (17 April 1958 – 1 November 2025) was a Belgian fashion designer and a founding member of the Antwerp Six, a group of influential Belgian fashion designers. She left the Antwerp Six in 1988. Vogue described her as the most elusive member of the Antwerp Six. In 2018, she resurfaced in Tokyo to attend the opening of a retrospective exhibition at the avant-garde vintage shop Laila, where Yee presented five new designs under the name M.Y. Project. This marked her first public output in more than a decade and initiated a successful relaunch of her fashion career. Marina Yee received the Jury Prize at the Belgian Fashion awards in 2024 for her timeless designs and artistic versatility. This award recognized her influential career as a member of the Antwerp Six and her comeback in 2022 with a collection of gender-inclusive pieces, which established her as a pioneer in the industry.

== Early years ==
Yee was born in Temse, Belgium, on 17 April 1958, to Liliane de Bruyne and Jean Yee. Her father became a colonial administrator in the Belgian Congo, and the family lived there for a few years before returning to Belgium. Yee's father later became director of a department store chain, and the family moved around Belgium before settling in Hasselt when Marina was 15.

== Early career ==
Yee began her training at the Sint-Lucas Institute in Hasselt before continuing her studies at the Royal Academy of Fine Arts in Antwerp, where she remained until 1981. It was during this time that she met the other members of the Antwerp Six. Her career progressed rapidly: shortly after graduation, she received financial backing from partners, first Bassetti and later Hobo. For Hobo, she designed a collection titled Marie. Yee has indicated that this collection did not fully reflect her own design vision.

== Stepping away from fashion ==
Yee had a professional and personal relationship with fellow designer Martin Margiela, whom she met in 1975 at Sint-Lucas in Genk. In 1992 she returned to Belgium, where she opened a snack bar, Indigo, in Brussels.

Yee's career has included periods of professional activity interspersed with breaks from the fashion industry. In 1999, she designed a winter collection for the Belgian brand Lena Lena, founded by former fashion journalist Miet Crabbé. Between 2000 and 2002, she designed women’s collections for Dirk Bikkembergs. In 2003, she established a studio in Brussels, producing pieces from existing garments and second-hand fabrics. In 2011, she introduced an interior fabric line for the Belgian company Aristide, comprising nine collections inspired by aspects of her personality. In 2015, she collaborated with fashion academy alumnus Louison Grajcar on a perfume line.

In 2018, Yee presented a new collection, marking her first public work since 2005. The M.Y. Project, comprising five designs, was showcased in Tokyo at Laila Tokyo, a high-fashion boutique. The collection focused on sustainable fashion, utilizing second-hand fabrics from vintage stores and flea markets.

In 2003, she stated her preference for creating outside mass-produced collections, emphasizing the importance of maintaining her identity as a designer. She has described her approach as a "prutskous"—a term reflecting a playful and experimental engagement with the creative process rather than commercial objectives.

== Death ==
Yee died from pancreatic cancer in Antwerp on 1 November 2025, at the age of 67.
