= Sébastien Meunier =

French fashion designer (born 1974)

- Born: April 9, 1974 (age 52); Versailles, France
- Education: ESMOD
- Occupation: Fashion Designer
- Employer(s): Maison Margiela, Ann Demeulemeester
- Awards: 1st Fashion Prize, 1998, Festival international de mode et de photographie

Sébastien Meunier is a French fashion designer. He was the creative director of Ann Demeulemeester's label from 2010 until 2020.

== Biography ==
Sébastien Meunier was born in Versailles in 1974.

He graduated from ESMOD, the Paris-based fashion school, in 1997. The next year, he presented his first collection at the Festival international de mode et de photographie in Hyères. The collection, that drew inspiration from fetichism and body transformations, was awarded with the first fashion prize from the jury presided by Martine Sitbon, Hussein Chalayan and Jean Colonna - the later offering him immediately his first position. Sébastien Meunier assisted Jean Colonna until he decided to launch his own menswear label in 1999.

Through his brand, which is autobiographical, Sébastien Meunier explored for 7 years specific areas of masculinity and identities, and is noted for the focus on the sexualization of the male body in fashion.

As early as 2000, Sébastien Meunier's work caught the attention of Martin Margiela, inaugurating a decade-long collaboration with the designer, first as head of design for MM6, then as creative director for all men's lines of Maison Margiela.

Ann Demeulemeester asked him to join her in Antwerp in 2010 to look after her menswear collections, cementing Sébastien Meunier's affinity with Belgian fashion. Following her decision to retire from the fashion industry in 2013, the Belgian designer chose him as her successor at the helm of the brand she founded in 1985. While staying true to the DNA of the Nineties romantic designer, Sébastien Meunier made the brand evolve toward a more inclusive, gender(s) free(d) aesthetic, reaching a fresh audience. In July 2020, Sébastien Meunier left the company shortly before the relocation of the brand in Italy.

In parallel to his designer's work, Sébastien Meunier is particularly interested in the arts of performance, having staged or participated to several performances throughout his career, including EAT (°2008), which he co-created with the late choreographer Alain Buffard, and is now part of the collection of the Centre Pompidou.
