= Royal Academy of Fine Arts (Antwerp) =

Art academy in Antwerp

Coordinates: 51.2234°N 4.4069°E

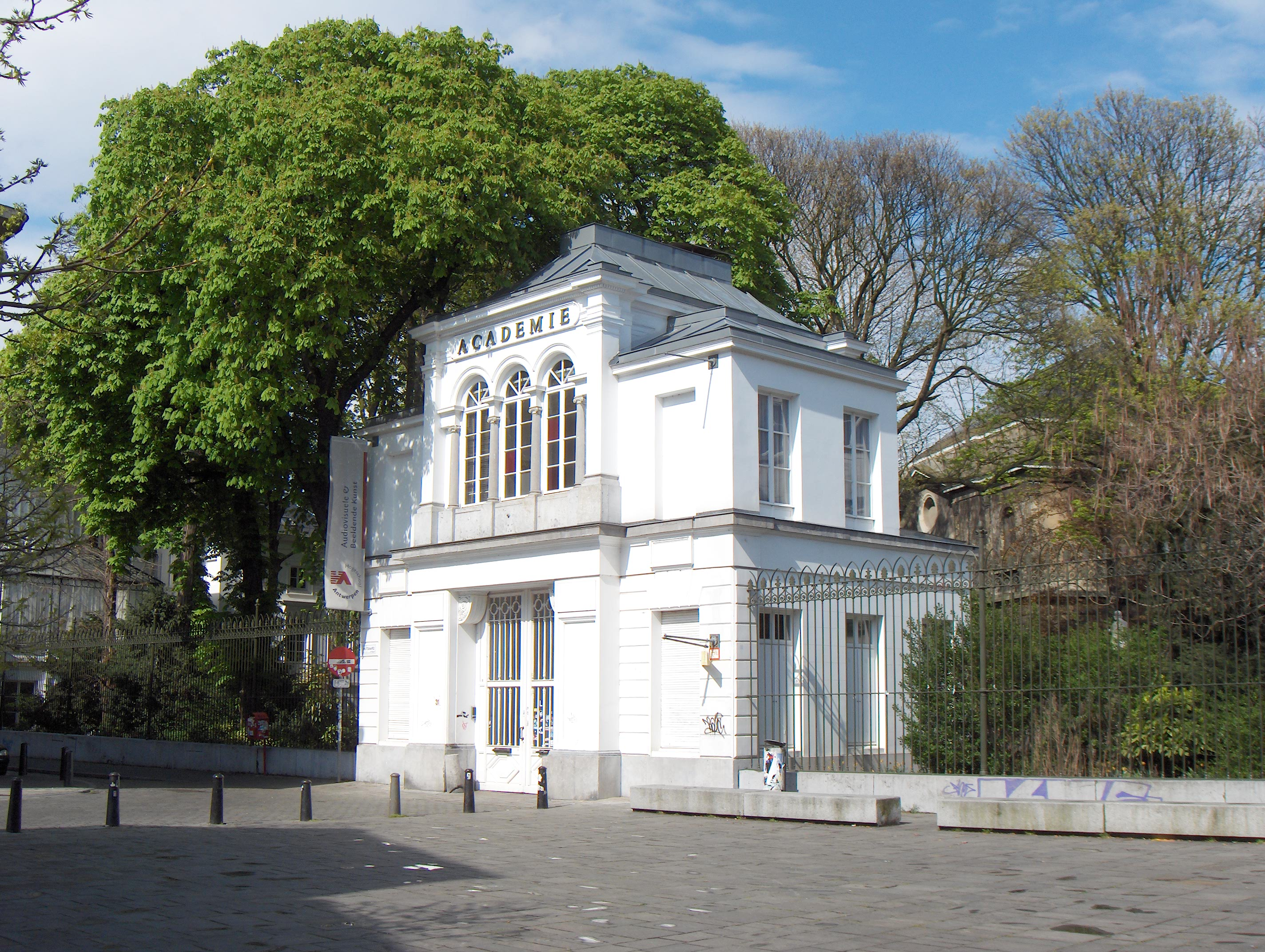
The Neoclassical entrance gate (1841-1843) designed by Pierre Bourla

The Royal Academy of Fine Arts Antwerp (Dutch: Koninklijke Academie voor Schone Kunsten van Antwerpen) is an art academy located in Antwerp, Belgium. It is one of the oldest of its kind in Europe. It was founded in 1663 by David Teniers the Younger, painter to the Archduke Leopold Wilhelm and Don Juan of Austria. Teniers was master of the Guild of St Luke—which embraced arts and some handicrafts—and petitioned Philip IV of Spain, then master of the Spanish Netherlands, to grant a royal charter to establish a Fine Arts Academy in Antwerp. It houses the Antwerp Fashion Academy.

== 19th century ==
The Royal Academy developed into an internationally acclaimed institute for Fine Arts, Architecture and Design. From the nineteenth century on, the academy attracted young artists from abroad. Irish, German, Dutch, Polish artists looking for a solid classical training found their way to Antwerp. Under the direction of Gustave Wappers (1803–1874) and his registrar Hendrik Conscience, the academy faced significant restructuring. The academy's significant art collection was exhibited in its own gallery space. By 1890, this gallery would develop into the Royal Museum of Fine Arts (Dutch; Koninklijk Museum voor Schone Kunsten) and would move to its current location in Antwerp.

In 1880, a promising young artist Henry Van de Velde enrolled at the Antwerp Academy. He would become one of the pioneering 20th century architects and designers. In 1885 and 1886, Vincent van Gogh was also to spend a short time at the Antwerp academy, prior to his departure to France.

In 1885, King Leopold II commissioned the establishment of the National Higher Institute for Fine Arts Antwerp (Nationaal Hoger Instituut voor Schone Kunsten) as a unique post graduate program, inspired by the Ecole des Beaux-Arts in Paris.

== 20th and 21st centuries ==
In 1946, the Architecture program became an independent institute, The National Higher Institute of Architecture. Another key moment in the history of the academy would be 1963. A new course ‘Fashion Design’ started. This course was moderately successful from the beginning years, but became renowned in the fashion world during the 1980s when “the Antwerp Six” designers (Dirk Bikkembergs, Walter Van Beirendonck, Marina Yee, Dries Van Noten, Dirk Van Saene and Ann Demeulemeester) became prominent alumni. The fashion program attracted many talents from all over the globe. With over 130 students, it is the largest program in the visual arts and design department.

In 1995, the Flemish higher educational system faced a radical metamorphosis. The Antwerp Academy and the Henry Van de Velde Institute were included as faculties in a bigger college structure, The University College of Antwerp (Dutch: Hogeschool Antwerpen). However, the Higher Institute of Fine Arts was kept independent and to develop into a separate entity.

The academy nowadays offers three distinctive programs: Visual Arts and Design, Conservation studies and a one-year dedicated teachers training. A body of 540 students (of whom 230 are international) work in the four main buildings located in the heart of the city: Mutsaardstraat (photography, silversmithing/jewelry, costume design and fine arts), Nationalestraat (fashion) and Keizerstraat (graphic design). As of September 2013, the programs are offered by the "Artesis Plantijn Hogeschool Antwerpen", a fusion between Artesis Hogeschool Antwerpen and Plantijn Hogeschool.

== Nurse of Painters ==
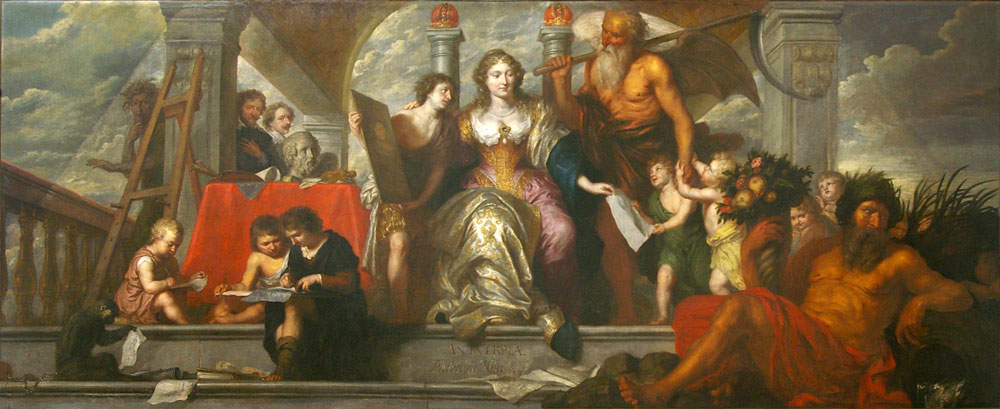
Theodoor Boeyermans, Antwerp, Nurse of Painters (1665), Royal Museum of Fine Arts, Antwerp.

Shortly after the founding of Antwerp Academy, three large paintings were executed for its meeting hall. Antwerp, Nurse of Painters, by Theodoor Boeyermans (1665; 188 x 454 cm), promotes the city's recent artistic past. Portraits of Peter Paul Rubens and Anthony van Dyck watch over students as they practise the arts. At the centre is the allegorical Antverpia pictorum nutrix ("Antwerp, nurse of painters"). Chronos accompanies other young students who present their artwork. The river god Scaldis, a personification of Antwerp's river Scheldt, symbolises with his cornucopia the wealth and bounty of the city's artistic heritage.

== Notable alumni ==
- Willis Seaver Adams
- Willem Albracht
- Lawrence Alma-Tadema
- Wilhelm Busch
- George Edmund Butler
- Jan Cockx
- Georges Croegaert
- Ann Demeulemeester
- Pieter Franciscus Dierckx
- Marthe Donas
- John Duncan
- Frans-Andries Durlet
- Jan Fabre
- David Foggie
- Frans Geerts
- Jan Geeraerts
- Gerard Muller
- Demna Gvasalia
- Dr. Hugo Heyrman
- Floris Jespers
- Nicaise de Keyser
- Jef Lambeaux
- Evert Larock
- Devon Halfnight LeFlufy
- William Logsdail
- Ford Madox Brown
- Martin Margiela
- Gustav Metzger
- Yuima Nakazato
- Nat Neujean
- Jef Nys
- Roderic O'Conor
- Walter Osborne
- Panamarenko
- Meryll Rogge
- Mommie Schwarz
- Hideki Seo
- Heaven Tanudiredja
- Luc Tuymans
- Kris Van Assche
- Jan van Beers
- Henry Van de Velde
- Vincent van Gogh
- Haider Ackermann
- Dries Van Noten
- Piet Verhaert
- Michel Marie Charles Verlat
- Bernardus Weber
- Albert Edelfelt
- Anne-Mie Van Kerckhoven
- Minju Kim
- Barış Manço
- Glenn Martens
- Marina Yee
- Walter Van Beirendonck
- Dirk Van Saene
- Antonin Tron

== See also ==
- List of art colleges in Europe
