= John Hollander =

American poet and literary critic (1929–2013)

- Born: October 28, 1929; Manhattan
- Died: August 17, 2013 (aged 83); Branford, Connecticut
- Education: Columbia University (BA, MA); Indiana University (PhD)
- Spouse(s): Anne Loesser; Natalie Charkow
- Children: Martha Hollander, Elizabeth Hollander
- Writing career
- Genre: Poetry

John Hollander (October 28, 1929 – August 17, 2013) was an American poet and literary critic. At the time of his death, he was Sterling Professor Emeritus of English at Yale University, having previously taught at Connecticut College, Hunter College, and CUNY Graduate Center. He was a 1990 MacArthur Fellow and poet laureate of Connecticut 2007–2009.

== Early life and education ==
John Hollander was born on October 28, 1929, in Manhattan to Muriel (Kornfeld) and Franklin Hollander, Jewish immigrant parents. He was the elder brother of Michael Hollander (1934–2015), a distinguished professor of architecture at Pratt Institute. He attended the Bronx High School of Science and then Columbia College of Columbia University, where he studied under Mark Van Doren and Lionel Trilling and overlapped with Allen Ginsberg (Hollander's poetic mentor), Jason Epstein, Richard Howard, Robert Gottlieb, Roone Arledge, Max Frankel, Louis Simpson and Steven Marcus. At Columbia, he joined the Boar's Head Society and the Philolexian Society. He was a junior fellow of the Harvard Society of Fellows. After graduating, he supported himself for a while by writing liner notes for classical music albums before returning to obtain an MA in literature and then a PhD from Indiana University.

== Career ==
Hollander stressed the importance of hearing poems out loud: "A good poem satisfies the ear. It creates a story or picture that grabs you, informs you and entertains you". The poet needs to be aware of the "sound of sense; the music of speech". To Hollander, verse was a kind of music in words, and he spoke eloquently about their connection with the human voice.

Hollander was also known for his translations from Yiddish. He usually wrote his poems on a computer, but if inspiration struck him, he said that, "I've been known to start poems on napkins and scraps of paper, too."

Hollander was considered to have technical poetic powers without equal, as exampled by his "Powers of Thirteen" poem, an extended sequence of 169 (13 × 13) unrhymed 13-line stanzas with 13 syllables in each line. These constraints liberated rather than inhibited his imagination, giving a fusion of metaphors that enabled him to conceive this work as "a perpetual calendar". Hollander also composed poems as "graphematic" emblems (Type of Shapes, 1969) and epistolary poems (exampled in Reflections on Espionage, 1976), and, as a critic (in Vision and Resonance: Two Senses of Poetic Form, 1975), offered telling insights into the relationship between words and music and sound in poetry, and in metrical experimentation, and 'the lack of a theory of graphic prosody'.

Hollander influenced poets Todd LaRoche and Karl Kirchwey, who both studied under Hollander at Yale. He taught Kirchwey that it was possible to build a life around the task of writing poetry. Kirchwey recalled Hollander's passion: 'Since he is a poet himself ... he conveyed a passion for that knowledge as a source of current inspiration.'

Hollander also served in the following positions, among others: member of the board, Wesleyan University Press (1959–62); editorial assistant for poetry, Partisan Review (1959–65); and contributing editor of Harper's Magazine (1969–71). His other role was as a poetry critic.

Hollander's poetry has been set to music by Milton Babbitt, Elliott Carter, and others; in 2007 he collaborated with the Eagles, allowing them use of his poem "An Old Fashioned Song" to create the song "No More Walks in the Wood".

== Personal life and death ==
Hollander resided in Woodbridge, Connecticut, where he served as a judge for several high-school recitation contests. He said he enjoyed working with students on their poetry and teaching it. With his ex-wife, Anne Loesser (daughter of pianist Arthur Loesser; married 1953–77), he was the father of writer Martha Hollander and uncle of the songwriter Sam Hollander. He married Natalie Charkow in 1981.

Hollander died at Branford, Connecticut, on August 17, 2013, at the age of 83.

== Awards and honors ==
- 2006: Appointed Poet Laureate of the State of Connecticut (term ended in 2009)
- 2006: Robert Fitzgerald Prosody Award
- 2002: Philolexian Award for Distinguished Literary Achievement
- 1990: MacArthur Fellowship
- 1983: Bollingen Prize for Powers of Thirteen
- 1979: elected a member of the American Academy of Arts and Letters Department of Literature
- 1958: Yale Series of Younger Poets for his first book of poems, A Crackling of Thorns, chosen by W. H. Auden

== Works ==
- A Crackling of Thorns (1958) poems
- The Untuning of the Sky (1961)
- The Wind and the Rain (1961) editor with Harold Bloom
- Movie-Going (1962) poems
- Philomel (1964) "cantata text" for the composition of the same name by American composer Milton Babbitt
- Visions from the Ramble (1965) poems
- The Quest of the Gole (1966)
- Jiggery-Pokery: A Compendium of Double Dactyls (1967) with Anthony Hecht
- Types of Shape (1969, 1991) poems
- Images of Voice (1970) criticism
- The Night Mirror (1971) poems
- Town and Country Matters (1972) poems
- The Oxford Anthology of English Literature (1973), co-editor
- The Head of the Bed (1974) poems, with commentary by Harold Bloom
- Tales Told of the Fathers (1975) poems
- Vision and Resonance (1975) criticism
- Reflections on Espionage (1976) poems. Included by Harold Bloom in his Western Canon.
- Spectral Emanations: New and Selected Poems (1978)
- Blue Wine (1979) poems
- The Figure of Echo (1981) criticism
- Rhyme's Reason: A Guide to English Verse (1981, 1989, 2001, 2014) manual of prosody
- Powers of Thirteen (1983) poems
- In Time and Place (1986) poems
- Harp Lake (1988) poems
- Melodious Guile: Fictive Pattern in Poetic Language (1988)
- Some Fugitives Take Cover (1988) poems
- The Essential Rossetti (1990), editor
- Tesserae and Other Poems (1993). Included by Harold Bloom in his Western Canon.
- Selected Poetry (1993). Included by Harold Bloom in his Western Canon.
- American Poetry: The Nineteenth Century (1993), editor
- Animal Poems (1994) poems
- The Gazer's Spirit: Poems Speaking to Silent Works of Art (1995) criticism
- Committed to Memory: 100 Best Poems to Memorize (1996), editor
- The Work of Poetry (1997) criticism
- The Poetry of Everyday Life (1998) criticism
- Figurehead and Other Poems (1999) poems
- Sonnets. From Dante to the present (2001), Everyman's library pocket poets.
- Picture Window (2003)
- American Wits: An Anthology of Light Verse (2003), editor
- Poems Bewitched and Haunted (2005), editor
- A Draft of Light (2008), poems
- The Substance of Shadow: a Darkening Trope in Poetic History (2016), lectures
