= Ann Demeulemeester =

Belgian fashion designer (born 1959)

- Born: Ann Verhelst; 29 December 1959 (age 66); Kortrijk, Belgium
- Education: Royal Academy of Fine Arts
- Occupations: Fashion and houseware designer
- Years active: 1985–present
- Spouse: Patrick Robyn (m. 1985)

Ann Verhelst (born 29 December 1959), known professionally as Ann Demeulemeester (Dutch pronunciation: [ɑn dəˈmøːləˌmeːstər]), is a Belgian fashion designer whose label, Ann Demeulemeester, is mainly showcased at the annual Paris Fashion Week. She is known as one of the Antwerp Six in the fashion industry.

== Early life ==
Ann Verhelst was born in Kortrijk in 1959 to Albert and Monique Verhelst-Pappijn,, grew up in Waregem and later lived in the city of Antwerp. The reason why she made the decision to change her real name "Verhelst" to "Demeulemeester" remains unknown. Initially, Verhelst showed no interest in fashion. She attended art school for three years, where she discovered her fascination with people and portraiture, which led her to begin thinking about clothing design. From this, she went on to study fashion design at the Royal Academy of Fine Arts in Antwerp from 1978 to 1981. In 1986, Verhelst, along with fellow graduates from the Antwerp Royal Academy, decided to showcase her collection in London. Though, as she was pregnant at the time and unable to make the trip to London, she only displayed a selection of sunglasses. Demeulemeester's success was instant: Berneys ordered her entire collection on the spot. This group of Belgian designers would soon be known as the 'Antwerp Six', a radical and distinctive Belgian group of designers of the 1980s. This group of avant-garde designers are known for their deconstructivist styles of creating untraditional clothing lines. Other notables from the group include Dries van Noten and Walter Van Beirendonck.

== Education and early career ==
Verhelst graduated from the Royal Academy of Fine Arts in 1981. A year after her graduation, she won the Gouden Spoel, a Belgian awarded prize to the year's most promising fashion designer, though the impact of the award in the industry was very limited. Verhelst struggled to find a first job and began working as a freelance pattern maker, assisting fashion icon Martin Margiela for an undisclosed Italian brand for a few years.

== Ann Demeulemeester ==
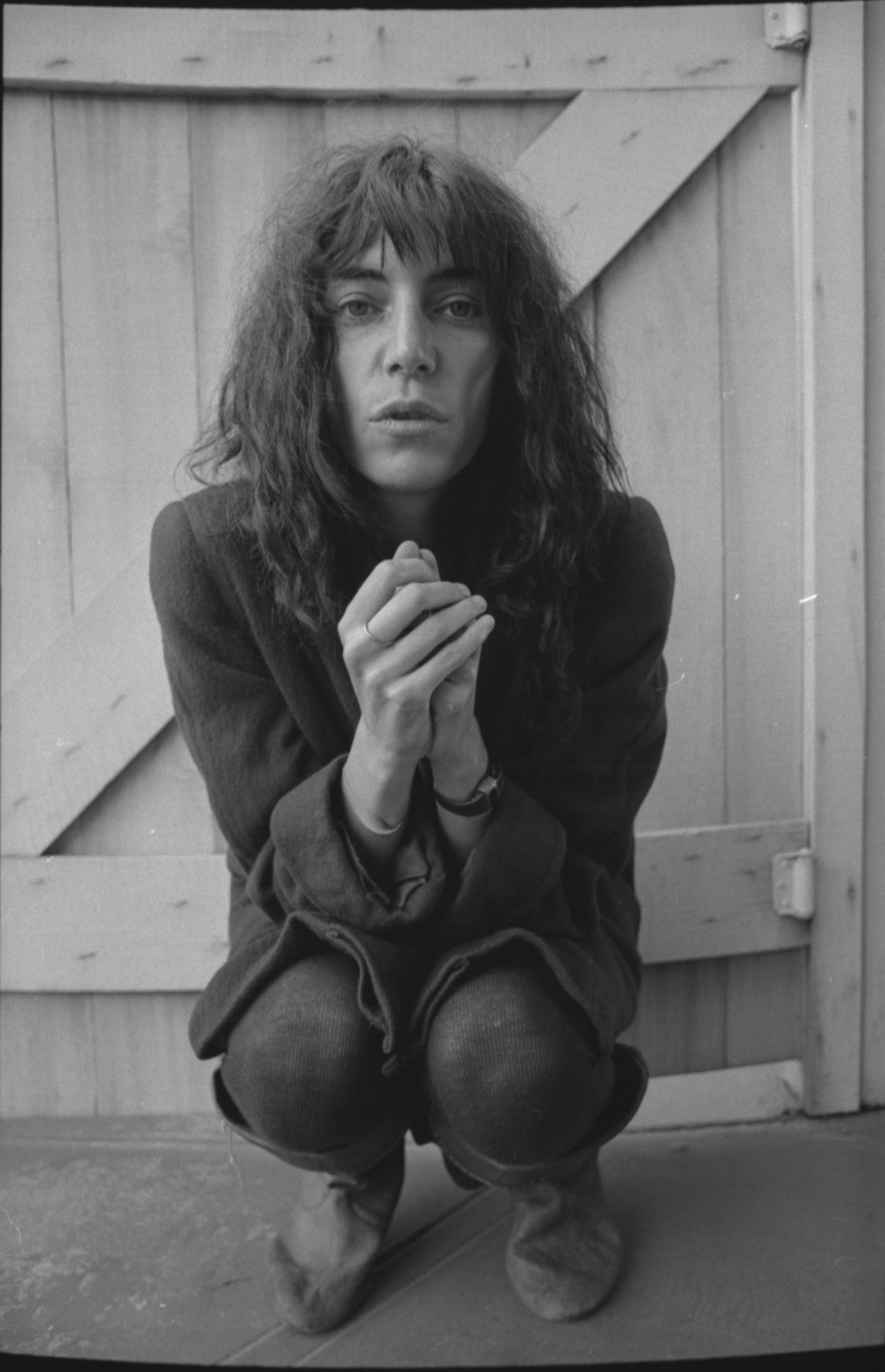
Musician Patti Smith, one of Demeulemeester's major influences

In 1985, Verhelst finally launched her own brand, Ann Demeulemeester-Verhelst, in collaboration with her husband, Patrick Robyn, who put an end to a burgeoning career as a photographer to devote himself to his wife's fashion label, assuming the role of a shadow creative director for the brand, an unofficial position that he still occupies to this day. She produced her first collection for the fall 1987 season, adding shoes and accessories the following year.

In 1992, Dirk Van Saene self-published Dirk Van Saene's Bambi, a photo-collaged comic that lampooned his fellow Antwerp designers with a special focus on Ann Verhelst, highlighting the tensions between Demeulemeester and the other designers in the Antwerp Six.

In 1994, Ann Verhelst approached Belgian entrepreneur Anne Chapelle for help in building her brand, which, under her tenure, turned into a substantial global business, debuting a menswear line in 1996 and opening the brand's flagship store in Antwerp in 1999. Finally, in 2005, Anne Chapelle acquired the company's majority stake from Ann Verhelst.

Verhelst worked with the artist Jim Dine, and draws inspiration from singer Patti Smith. She worked on a clothing line inspired by Jackson Pollock.

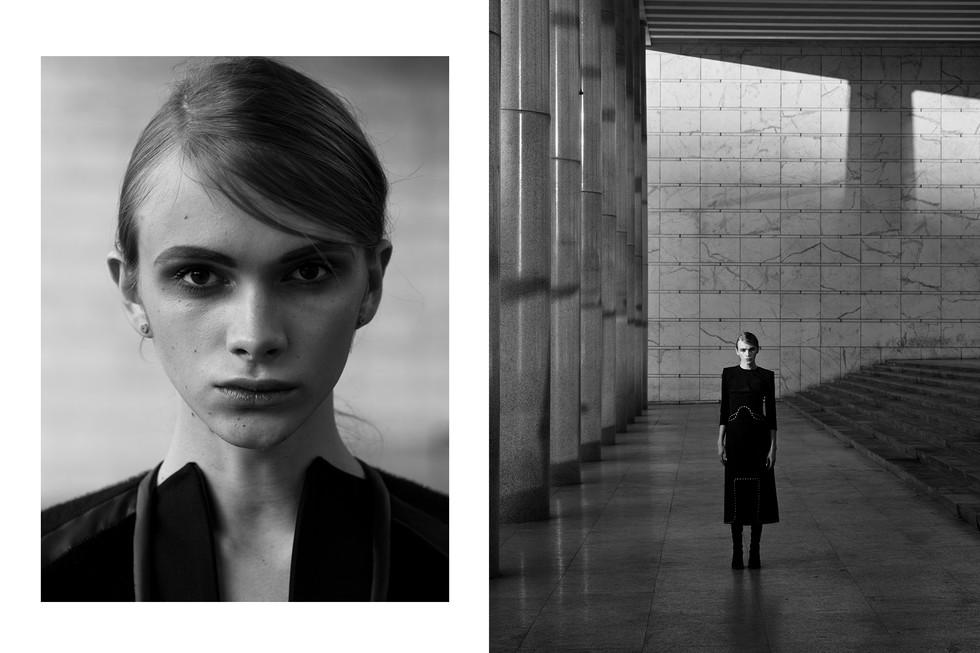
Model Stav Strashko modelling Ann Demeulemeester shoes

In November 2013, Verhelst announced she was leaving the fashion house with a handwritten exit letter. Prior to her departure, Ann Verhelst personally chose the French designer Sébastien Meunier as her successor as artistic director of the brand. Sébastien Meunier had previously worked for 10 years with the Belgian fashion genius Martin Margiela before joining Ann Demeulemeester in 2010, officially designing the house's men's collections, while in reality being trained by Ann Verhelst and Patrick Robyn themselves to his future position of artistic director. Sébastien Meunier left the label in July 2020.

=== Ann Demeulemeester by Serax ===
After leaving fashion, Verhelst attended porcelain master classes in England and France. In 2019, she launched Ann Demeulemeester Serax in collaboration with Belgian diffusion label Serax, a collection of affordable porcelain dinner services made in China, but also silverware, glasses and larger houseware, following the path of other famous fashion designers of the like of Inès de la Fressange, José Levy or Christian Lacroix.

=== Ann Demeulemeester by Antonioli ===
After the Italian retailer Claudio Antonioli bought the company in 2020 and after the resignation of Sébastien Meunier, Ann Verhelst announced, in September 2021, her return to the Ann Demeulemeester label, therefore forever linking her name and legacy to Claudio Antonioli, whose name is mainly associated with the rise of luxury streetwear. That same month, the brand's Antwerp flagship store reopened after a year of renovation.

In the meantime, Belgian national newspaper De Tijd revealed that 42 out of the 48 Antwerp-based employees of Ann Demeulemeester had been dismissed, despite most of them having been working for the label for decades, hired by Ann Verhelst herself. The article also revealed that the company itself was relocated to Milan, definitively cutting the fashion house from its historical Flemish roots. In an exclusive interview granted to journalist Jesse Brouns, Ann Verhelst, Patrick Robyn and Claudio Antonioli confirmed the relocation of the Belgian brand to Italy, the later stating that "Milan [compared to Antwerp] is a fashion city. That made recruiting a new team of 25 people easier."

Claudio Antonioli enrolled designer Nina Maria Nitsche as "ghost" creative director of the brand, another Maison Margiela alumna, after her short stances at both Vetements and Kering's own Brioni.

The brand's first fashion show of the Antonioli era took place in October 2021 in Paris; it relied mostly on denim, and received mixed reviews from the international press. As for the second outing of Claudio Antonioli for the brand, in March 2022, Vogue described it, in a notably harsh review, as if "[t]he models all looked like they were heading to a meeting with their bank managers to declare themselves bankrupt".

For Sanremo Music Festival 2022, Ann Demeulemeester dressed Italian musician Mahmood, who joins the list of the brand's legends alongside Patti Smith and PJ Harvey.

In December 2022, to the industry's surprise, Claudio Antonioli named the social-media savvy Ludovic de Saint-Sernin as creative director of Ann Demeulemeester, only to part ways with him less than six months later and after one collection. In June 2023, Antonioli then appointed the brand's fourth creative director in less than three years, Stefano Gallici, a former intern at Haider Ackermann and half of a duo of Italian DJs called the Nausea Twins.

In September 2023, Ann Verhelst and Claudio Antonioli released an exclusive fragrance designed by Italian nose Nicola Bianchi.

At the end of Italian fiscal year 2022, Ann Demeulemeester's parent company, AD Milano S.R.L., reported a net loss of -10.555.311,00 euros for a total turnover of only 9.166.499,00 euros.

In 2026, the brand opened two flagship stores: one on Via Monte Napoleone in Milan and the other at the Palais Royal in Paris. The openings are part of a broader retail strategy to establish standalone boutiques in major international markets, with store designs intended to reflect Ann Demeulemeester's brand identity and sell directly to consumers.

== Personal life ==
Verhelst married photographer Patrick Robyn in 1985.

== Awards ==
- 1982 Golden Spindle Award, Belgium

== Distinction ==
In 2025, the Belgian King Filip made her a baroness.

== See also ==
- Antwerp Six
- Deconstruction (fashion)
- List of fashion designers
