= Walter Van Beirendonck =

Belgian fashion designer

- Born: 4 February 1957 (age 69); Brecht, Belgium
- Education: Royal Academy of Fine Arts (Antwerp)
- Labels: Walter Van Beirendonck; W&LT
- Website: www.waltervanbeirendonck.com

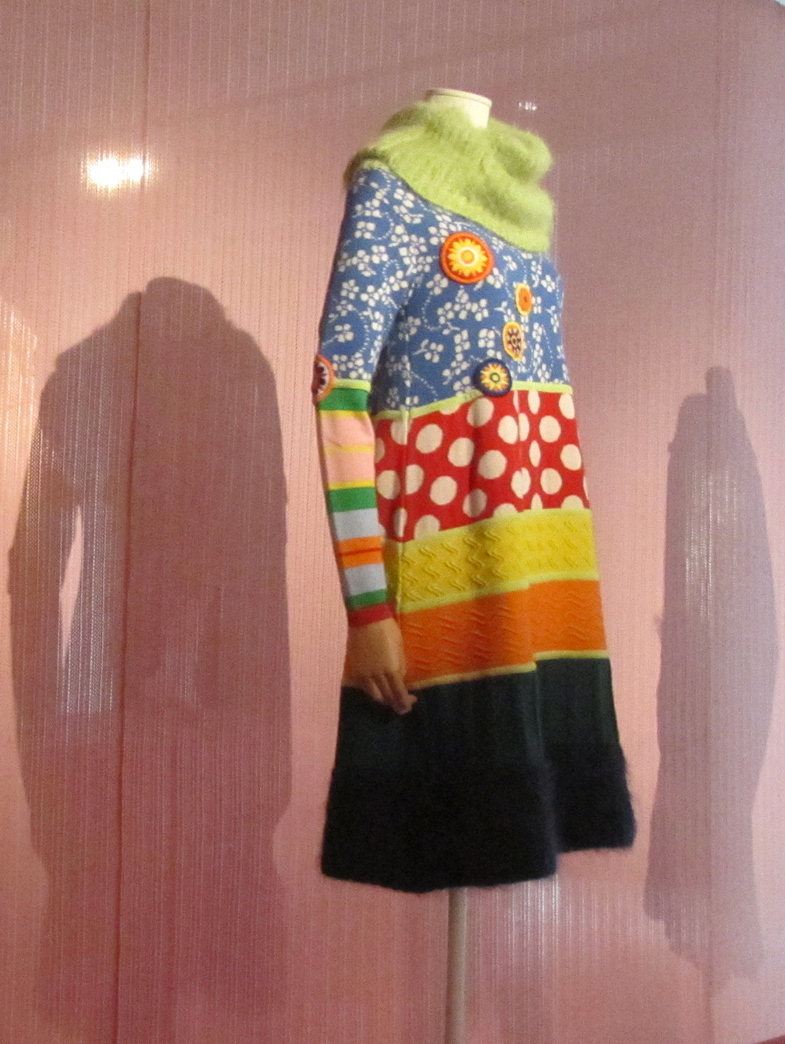
Dress inspired by Hui'an women of Quanzhou, China, exhibited ModeMuseum, Antwerp, 2011

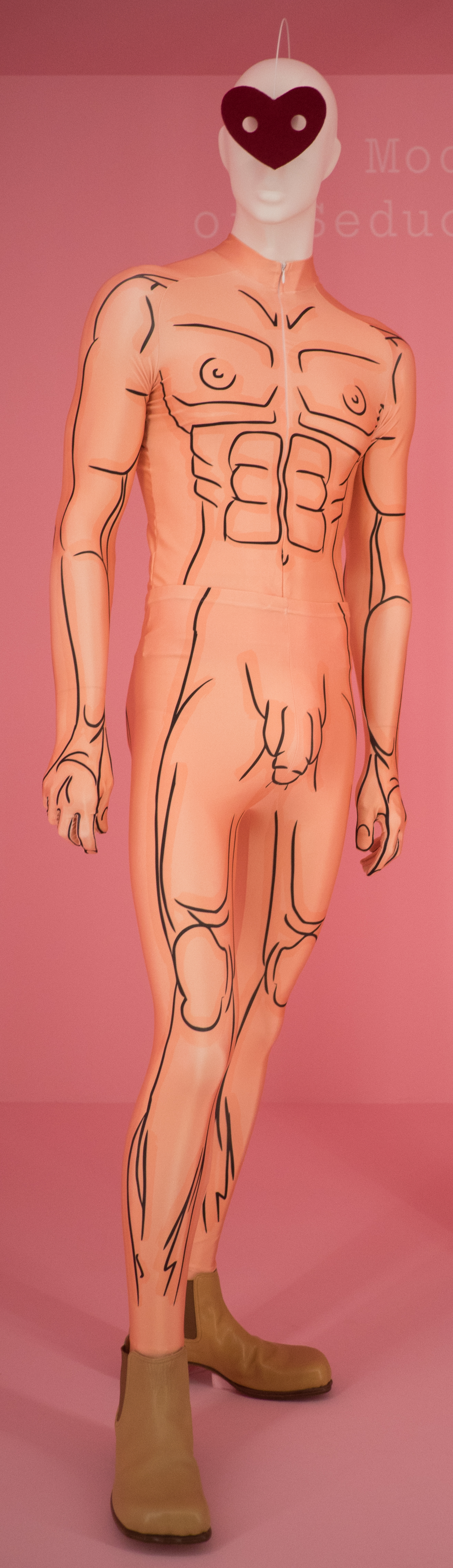
2009 catsuit by Van Beirendonck on display at the Metropolitan Museum of Art's exhibit Camp: Notes on Fashion

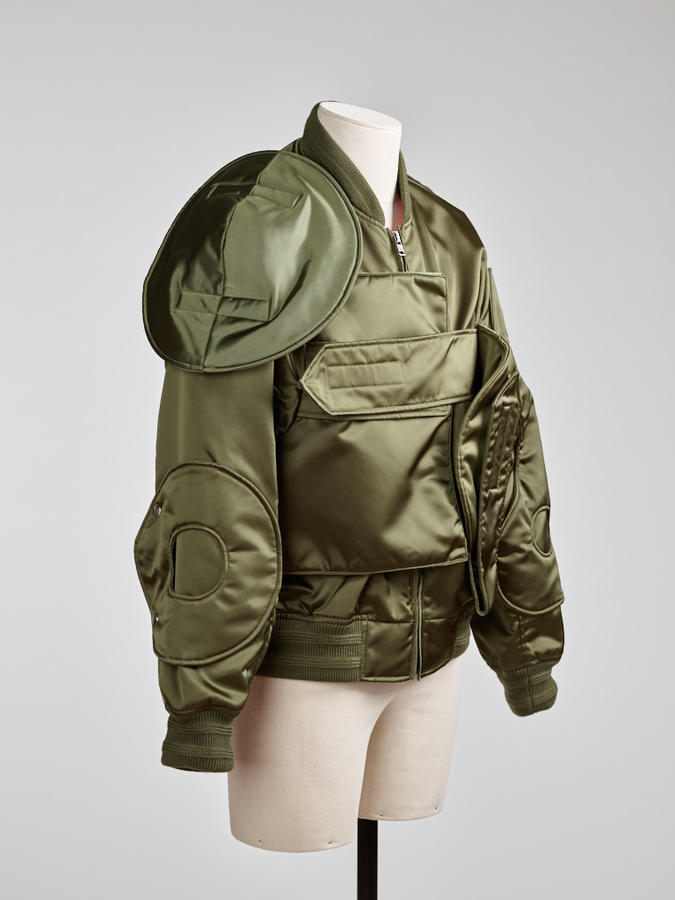
Man's jacket, Fall-Winter 2017 (RISD Museum)

Walter Van Beirendonck (born 4 February 1957) is a Belgian fashion designer. He was the head of the fashion department at the Royal Academy of Fine Arts Antwerp until 2022.

== Education ==
He graduated in 1980 from the Royal Academy of Fine Arts Antwerp.

== Career ==
Together with Dirk Van Saene, Dries Van Noten, Ann Demeulemeester, Marina Yee (graduated in 1981) and Dirk Bikkembergs (graduated in 1982) they became known as the Antwerp Six when the idea of Belgian fashion seemed like a contradiction in terms. He was the fashion advisor for U2 and their pop Mart Tour and Erasure for their Cowboy-Tour (both 1997).

Since 1983, he issues his own collections. They are inspired by the visual arts, literature, nature and ethnic influences. His unusual color combinations and a strong graphic influence are characteristic for his collections. In 1997, he designed the costumes for the U2 "PopMart Tour". In 1999, he was awarded the honorary title of "Cultural Ambassador of Flanders". In 2001, he curated the 'Fashion 2001 Landed-Geland' project in Antwerp. Next to five large exhibitions, a new magazine was launched: N°A magazine, published by Artimo, now called A MAGAZINE curated by.

== Collections ==
Collection	Season	Details
'Walter About Rights'	Winter 2020/2021	
WITBLITZ	Summer 2020	
WOW	Winter 2019/2020	
WILD IS THE WIND	Summer 2019	
WORLDS OF SUN AND MOON	Winter 2018/2019	
OWLS WHISPER	Summer 2018	This collection left mostly unexplained for fashion magazines. Vogue wrote "The designer clearly had something on his mind, but what?". WWD mentioned the collection as "cryptically titled", wondering "What did they [asymmetric, geometric faces on jackets and shirts] express — anger? Pensiveness?".
ZWART	Winter 2017/2018	Collection name Zwart was Dutch for black. The show was supported by Seidä Pass, "a band that looked like a group of metalhead trolls freshly summoned from hell". "For me, I think the time is black," Mr. Van Beirendonck explained to New York Times. "That’s why I wanted to add all those ingredients about paganism, and rituals, and animals — to heal the world."
WHY IS A RAVEN LIKE A WRITING-DESK?	Summer 2017	The collection name is taken from Alice's Adventures in Wonderland, it's the Hatter unsolvable riddle "Why is a raven like a writing desk?" "That futile search for an answer, for truth, is something that has been obsessing Walter Van Beirendonck’s work lately." wrote Vogue about the collection. The fairytale aesthetic of the collection linked to reality by such a words like "Brutal beauty", "Future folk", or "Reflection through destruction". "Brutal Love", "Total Liquidity" and "Self Destruction" were next words used by Walter van Beirendonck's and eyewear brand FAKBYFAK as titles for a fashion film collaboration. Released on Tremors TV these three videos were inspired by Alice in Wonderland, early 70s punk culture, wild and colourful make-up, brutal beauty, and multiracialism, and "have been created to celebrate the launch of 'Toy Glasses', Beirendonck's new line of spectacles.
WOEST	Winter 2016/2017	“It’s a Flemish word, my language,” said Van Beirendonck. “It means ‘furious.’ Because I am really angry.”
Electric eye	Summer 2016	
Explicit Beauty	Winter 2015/2016	
WHAMBAM!	Summer 2015	
Crossed Crocodiles Growl	Winter 2014/2015	
Home Sweet Home	Summer 2014	
Shut your eyes to see	Winter 2013/2014	
Silent Secrets	Summer 2013	¨It refers to how secret societies deal with issues. The collection was inspired by the form of clothing and the dress codes that are used in secret societies. These codes were interpreted by Walter in his own way with a new contemporary refinement. The collars and hats here were a collaboration with the Dutch sculptor that Walter admired, Folkert de Jong.
Lust Never Sleeps	Winter 2012/2013	In this collection Walter used the masks and the bowler hats. "For me, when I was working on the collection, there were two main inspirations: voodoo and a kind of future dandyism. ... I wanted to give this collection a kind of spiritual atmosphere. I evoked a rather tense effect by putting skin-coloured masks, white skin on top of black-skinned models.”

== See also ==
- List of fashion designers
- Ellen Ekkart
