= Willem Albracht =

Belgian painter (1861–1922)

- Born: Willem Albracht ca. 1861; Belgium
- Died: ca. 1922
- Education: Academy of Antwerp
- Parent(s): Adolph Bernhard Albracht and Anna Wilhelmina Robart

Willem Albracht (1861 – 1922) was a Belgian painter

== Biography ==
Willem Albracht son of Adolph Bernhard Albracht and Anna Wilhelmina Robart, was a painter of portraits, interiors and landscapes, born in Antwerp in 1861, died in Berchem-lez-Anvers in 1922. He was a student at the Academy of Antwerp and worked in the studio of Charles Verlat (1824 – 1890). Traveled in particular in Holland and in Germany. In 1883, he was one of the founders of the “Als ick Kan” circle which gathered young artists seeking to create exhibitions in Belgium and neighboring countries . From this date, he exhibits regularly in Belgium, Antwerp, Brussels, Ghent, Mechelen, Liège, Namur, Louvain and Mons. In 1911, the painter had his own home designed in eclectic style in Zurenborg district, where numerous artists and architects took up residence. Until then Albracht lived at 117 Mechelsesteenweg in Antwerp. He chose Hendrik Van Leemputten as architect. Many of his works appeared in several museums and public collection as Rijksmuseum and exhibitions in Berlin, from 1891 to 1896 or museum of Fine Arts in Antwerp that owns: “The old laboratory of the charity office in Antwerp” (1889) and “The old pharmacy of the office of charity in Antwerp ”(1889).

== Artwork ==
Albracht was able to deal with the classic themes of painters of the Dutch Golden Age, in particular interiors, with a dense and pasty brushstroke which, however, in its dynamism not only cares for detail but demonstrates great sensibility to the effects of light on colors.

== Works ==
- Portrait of an unknown boy etching, signed, Rijksmuseum
- The geographer oil on panel, signed
- Couple in conversation oil on panel, signed
- Tavern scene with eel fisherman oil on panel, signed
- The garden of the poors oil on panel, signed and dated 1887
