= Martha Hollander =

American poet and art historian (born 1959)

- Born: March 24, 1959 (age 67)
- Occupation: Poet
- Parent(s): John Hollander (father); Anne Hollander (mother)

Academic background
- Education: Yale University; University of California, Berkeley

Martha Hollander (born March 24, 1959) is an American poet and art historian.

== Life ==
She is the daughter of the poet John Hollander and the fashion historian Anne Hollander. Hollander graduated from Yale University in 1980, with a B.A. cum laude in Art. She later studied at University of California at Berkeley, where she received M.A. in 1985 and a Ph.D. in 1990, both in Art History.

She is Professor of Art History at Hofstra University, having also taught at the Pratt Institute, Parsons the New School for Design, School of Visual Arts, University at Albany, SUNY, and UCLA.

Her poems have appeared in many journals, including the Southampton Review, The Minnesota Review, Poetry, The Paris Review, Raritan Quarterly, and Southwest Review. In 1989 she won the Walt Whitman Award from the Academy of American Poets.

She lives in Jackson Heights, New York, with her husband, Jonathan Bumas, and two children.

== Works ==
=== Poetry ===
- —— (1990). The Game of Statues. Atlantic Monthly Press. ISBN 978-0-87113-369-4.
- ——; Horton, Rick (1985). Always History. Sea Cliff Press. (chapbook)

=== Art History ===
- Martha Hollander (2002). An Entrance for the Eyes. University of California Press. ISBN 9780520221352.
