= Ellen Ekkart =

Dancer and choreographer

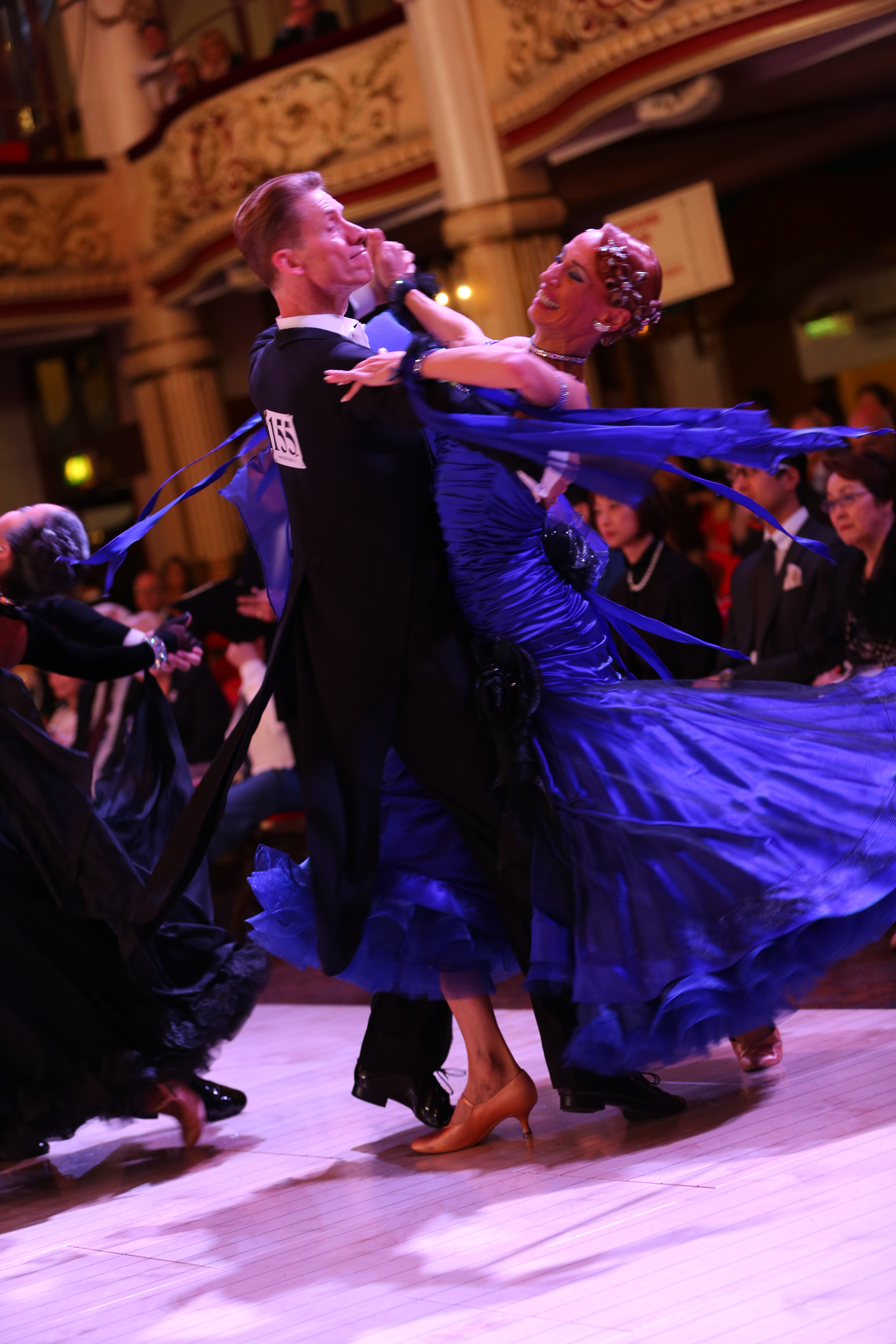
Peter & Ellen Ekkart, during the Professional Blackpool Ballroom event, May 2015

Ellen Ekkart (also known as Ellen Ekkart-Saey) (born June 1973) is a Belgian professional dancer, dance teacher, choreographer and coach. She specializes in Latin and ballroom dancing.

== Early life ==
She graduated as an interior designer, but always had a love for dancing. She danced as an amateur in the Ballroom Formation team Dance Rhapsody, and later in the Latin Formation team Café Latino.

She graduated as a color and style consultant.

== Dancing career ==
- Between 1996 and 2001, she became two times Belgian Champion with Cafe Latino. She married her dance coach from Café Latino, Peter Ekkart, in 2001.
- She started teaching full-time in dance school Ekkart in 2001, and got her degree as a teacher and judge in the following years with the professional organisation Buldo, and the World Dance Council.
- In 2006, she was asked to be a professional dancer in Sterren op de dansvloer, the Belgian version of Dancing with the Stars (US) or Strictly Come Dancing (UK).
- In 2008 she started competitive dancing after working together with her husband on the television show Sterren op de Dansvloer. Two years later, they won all six Belgian Championships in a row, in the ballroom style, from 2010 to 2015.
- They participated in all World and European Championships from 2008, and travelled the world.
- In June 2016, they placed second at the World Professional Ballroom Championships 40+ in Cervia, Italy.

== Vice World-Champion 2016 ==
Peter & Ellen Ekkart participated in all World and European Championships from 2008, and travelled the world. They danced at the Kremlin in Russia, South Korea, Japan, Canada, the US, and almost all European countries. In June 2015, they were placed third at the World Professional Ballroom Championships 40+, in Cervia, Italy. One year later, they moved to second place, and became the vice-world Professional Ballroom Champions 40+. This was the first time in history that a Belgian couple had gained this title.

After visiting the United States, they started learning American smooth dancing. They introduced this style for the first time in Belgian at the National Professional Belgian Congress in May 2016.

== Dancing With The Stars and other television work ==
From 2006 to 2011, VTM broadcast the Flemish version of Dancing with the Stars (US) or Strictly Come Dancing (UK). Ekkart participated as a professional dancer in the first three seasons.

- Season 1 with singer Sam Gooris, three episodes
- Season 2 with actor Herbert Flack, four episodes
- Season 3 with cyclist Nico Mattan, three episodes and five dance-offs

In 2006, she danced at the Gouden Schoen, the annual awards for professional soccer players.

She appeared as a candidate in Het Verstand van Vlaanderen, a TV show with Koen Wauters.

in 2007, she had a guest role in the Flemish soap series Wittekerke.

From 2007 to 2009, Ekkart choreographed dancers for a stage performance for the television show Zomerhit.

She provided dancers for national artists like Bart Peeters, Clouseau, and international artists as Sister Sledge, Kim Wilde and Melanie C from the Spice Girls.

in 2008, she was the principal dancer with her partner Peter in the TV1 program Duizend Zonnen en Garnalen.

== Other projects ==
=== Walter Van Beirendonck ===
In July 1997, Walter Van Beirendonck, the famous Belgian fashion designer of the Antwerp Six, asked Ekkart to collaborate with his fashion show for his 1998 summer collection in Paris. He needed 70 dancers, dressed in futuristic evening costumes, green gas masks and long green rubber gloves, to dance the final shownumber, for an audience of 3.000 fashion people and reporters. Peter Ekkart did the choreography, coordinated the act, and Ellen participated as a dancer and model.

=== Robert Groslot ===
In 2005, she danced 'Tango for Three' on a show with Robert Groslot, choreographed by Marc Bogaerts.

=== Dirk Brossé ===
Also in 2005, she danced and choreographed an act on the show of Dirk Brossé.

=== Dancing in prison ===
From 2005 to 2007, the Federal Antwerp Prison asked Ekkart to give dance lessons in the prison to the inmates, and to choreograph a show with the inmates.

=== Styling ===
From 2009 to 2016, she styled businesspeople, individuals and dancers, making them more confident and professional.

=== BBC Speaking Awards ===
In 2011 and 2013, she coached candidates for the BBC Speaking Awards.

=== The Ballroom Orchestra ===
Wim Jansegers had the idea of touring the Flemish cultural centers with authentic ballroom music. He looked for professional musicians and singers, and for a contact in the ballroom dancing world. That contact was soon found, and Peter and Ellen Ekkart were attracted as a show couple. They named the band The Ballroom Orchestra. The show included participation by the public, where musicians, dancers and the public interact with each other. The show toured for two years in 2013 and 2014, and played in all major cities. The highlight was three concerts in the authentic hall De Roma in Antwerp.

=== Wim Vandekeybus ===
For an audition for his show in 2015, Wim Vandekeybus had to choose from 600 dancers coming from all parts of the world. He hired Peter and Ellen Ekkart to give a session in ballroom dancing, so he could see how quickly the dancers picked up this style. The fusion of contemporary dance, ballet and ballroom gave a special mix Vandekeybus which can use in the near future.

== Personal life ==
She married in 2001, and the couple have two sons and a daughter.
