= Fashion design =

Art of applying design and aesthetics to clothing and accessories

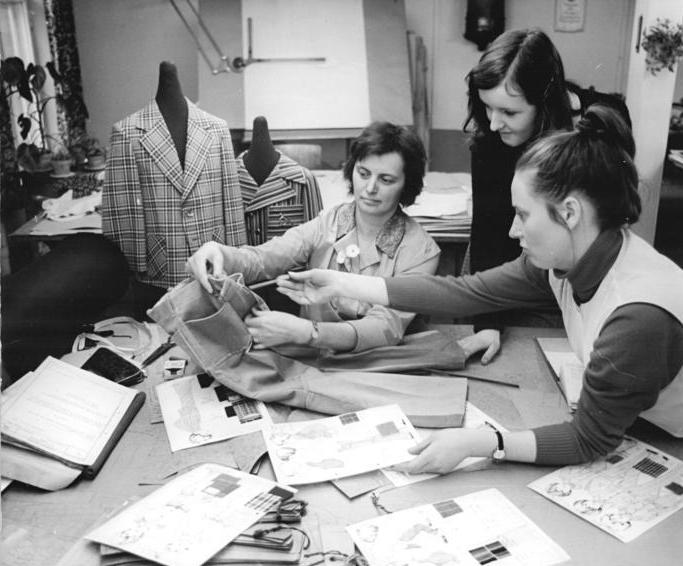
Fashion designers in 1974 in Dresden.

Fashion design is the art of applying design, aesthetics, clothing construction, and natural beauty to clothing and its accessories. It is influenced by diverse cultures and different trends and has varied over time and place. "A fashion designer creates clothing, including dresses, suits, pants, skirts, and accessories like shoes and handbags, for consumers. They can specialize in clothing, accessory, or jewelry design, or may work in more than one of these areas."

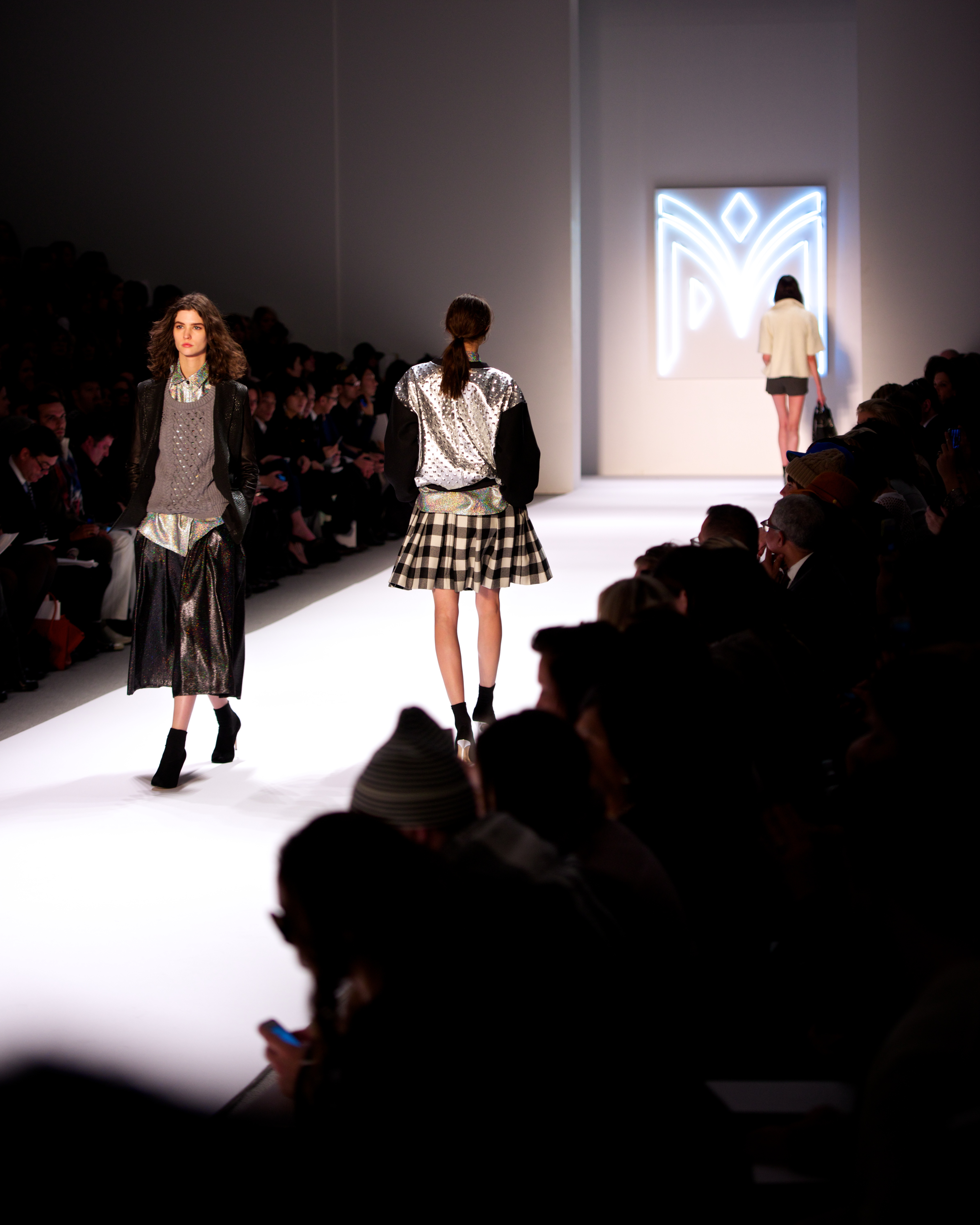
Fashion designers typically use a runway of models to showcase their work.

== Fashion designers ==
Fashion designers work in a variety of ways when designing their pieces and accessories such as rings, bracelets, necklaces, earrings and clothes. Due to the time required to put a garment out on the market, designers must anticipate changes to consumer desires. Fashion designers are responsible for creating looks for individual garments, involving shape, color, fabric, trimming, and more.

Fashion designers attempt to design clothes that are functional as well as aesthetically pleasing. They consider who is likely to wear a garment and the situations in which it will be worn, and they work with a wide range of materials, colors, patterns, and styles. Though most clothing worn for everyday wear falls within a narrow range of conventional styles, unusual garments are usually sought for special occasions such as evening wear or party dresses.

Some clothes are made specifically for an individual, as in the case of haute couture or bespoke tailoring. Today, most clothing is designed for the mass market, especially casual and everyday wear, which are commonly known as ready to wear or fast fashion.

=== Structure ===
There are different lines of work for designers in the fashion industry. Fashion designers who work full-time for a fashion house, as in-house designers, create designs owned by the company and may either work independently or as part of a design team. Freelance designers who work for themselves sell their designs to fashion houses, directly to shops, or to clothing manufacturers. There are quite a few fashion designers who choose to set up their labels, which offers them full control over their designs. Others are self-employed and design for individual clients. Other high-end fashion designers cater to specialty stores or high-end fashion department stores. These designers create original garments, as well as those that follow established fashion trends. Most fashion designers, however, work for apparel manufacturers, creating designs of men's, women's, and children's fashions for the mass market. Large designer brands that have a 'name' as their brand such as Abercrombie & Fitch, Justice, or Juicy are likely to be designed by a team of individual designers under the direction of a design director.

=== Designing a garment ===
Garment design includes components of "color, texture, space, lines, pattern, silhouette, shape, proportion, balance, emphasis, rhythm, and harmony". All of these elements come together to design a garment to create visual interest for consumers.

Fashion designers work in various ways. Some start with a vision in their head and later move into drawing it on paper or on a computer, while others go directly into draping fabric onto a dress form, also known as a mannequin. The design process is unique to the designer and it is rather intriguing to see the various steps that go into the process. Designing a garment starts with patternmaking. The process begins with creating a sloper or base pattern. The sloper will fit the size of the model a designer is working with or a base can be made by utilizing standard size charts.

Three major manipulations within patternmaking include dart manipulation, contouring, and added fullness. Dart manipulation allows for a dart to be moved on a garment in various places but does not change the overall fit of the garment. Contouring allows for areas of a garment to fit closer to areas of the torso such as the bust or shoulders. Added fullness increases the length or width of a pattern to change the frame as well as the fit of the garment. The fullness can be added on one side, unequal, or equally to the pattern.

A designer may choose to work with certain apps that can help connect all their ideas together and expand their thoughts to create a cohesive design. When a designer is completely satisfied with the fit of the toile (or muslin), they will consult a professional pattern maker who will then create the finished, working version of the pattern out of paper or using a computer program. Finally, a sample garment is made up and tested on a model to make sure it is an operational outfit. Fashion design is expressive; the designers create art that may be functional or non-functional.

== Technology within fashion ==
Over the years, there has been an increase in the use of technology within fashion design. Iris van Herpen, a Dutch designer, incorporated 3D printing in her Crystallization collection.

Software can aid designers in the product development stage. Designers can use artificial intelligence and virtual reality to prototype clothing. 3D modeling within software allows for initial sampling and development stages for partnerships with suppliers before the garments are produced. Product managers can use product lifecycle management software to develop multiple items across multiple product lines to assist in planning, assigning, and tracking tasks from concept to completion.

== History ==
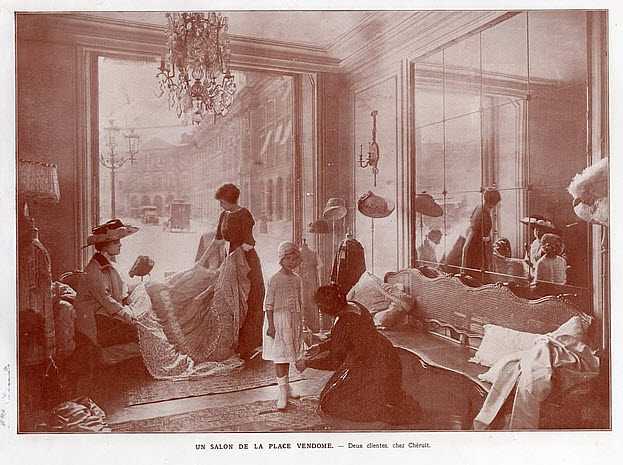
The Chéruit salon on Place Vendôme in Paris, 1910

Modern Western fashion design is often considered to have started in the 19th century with Charles Frederick Worth who was the first designer to have his label sewn into the garments that he created, although tailors had sewn in labels with their name since at least 1828. Before the former draper set up his maison couture (fashion house) in Paris, clothing design and creation of the garments were handled largely by anonymous seamstresses. At the time high fashion descended from what was popularly worn at royal courts. Worth's success was such that he was able to dictate to his customers what they should wear, instead of following their lead as earlier dressmakers had done. The term couturier was in fact first created in order to describe him. While all articles of clothing from any time period are studied by academics as costume design, only clothing created after 1858 is considered fashion design.

It was during this period that many design houses began to hire artists to sketch or paint designs for garments. Rather than going straight into manufacturing, the images were shown to clients to gain approval, which saved time and money for the designer. If the client liked their design, the patrons commissioned the garment from the designer, and it was produced for the client in the fashion house. This designer-patron construct launched designers sketching their work rather than putting the completed designs on models.

== Types of fashion ==
Garments produced by clothing manufacturers fall into three main categories, although these may be split up into additional, different types.

=== Haute couture ===
Until the 1950s, fashion clothing was predominately designed and manufactured on a made-to-measure or haute couture basis, with each garment being created for a specific client. A couture garment is made to order for an individual customer, and is usually made from high-quality, expensive fabric, sewn with extreme attention to detail and finish, often using time-consuming, hand-executed techniques. Look and fit take priority over the time and cost of production. Due to the high cost of each garment, haute couture makes little direct profit for the fashion houses, but is important for prestige and publicity.

=== Ready-to-wear (prêt-à-porter) ===
Ready-to-wear, or prêt-à-porter, clothes are a cross between haute couture and mass market. They are not made for individual customers, but great care is taken in the choice and cut of the fabric. Clothes are made in small quantities to guarantee exclusivity, so they are rather expensive. Ready-to-wear collections are usually presented by fashion houses each season during a period known as fashion week or fashion month. This takes place on a citywide basis and occurs twice a year. The main seasons of Fashion Week include spring/summer, fall/winter, resort, swim, and bridal.

Half-way garments are an alternative to ready-to-wear, "off-the-peg", or prêt-à-porter fashion. Half-way garments are intentionally unfinished pieces of clothing that encourage co-design between the "primary designer" of the garment and what would usually be considered the passive "consumer". This differs from ready-to-wear fashion, as the consumer can participate in the process of making and co-designing their clothing. During the Make{able} workshop, Hirscher and Niinimaki found that personal involvement in the garment-making process created a meaningful "narrative" for the user, which established a person-product attachment and increased the sentimental value of the final product.

Otto von Busch also explores halfway garments and fashion co-design in his thesis, "Fashion-able, Hacktivism and engaged Fashion Design".

=== Mass market ===
Currently, the fashion industry relies more on mass-market sales. The mass market caters to a wide range of customers, producing ready-to-wear garments using trends set by the famous names in fashion. They often wait around a season to make sure a style is going to catch on before producing their versions of the original look. To save money and time, they use cheaper fabrics and simpler production techniques that can easily be assisted by machines. The end product can, therefore, be sold much more cheaply.

There is a type of design called "kitsch" that originated from the German word kitschig, meaning "trashy" or "not aesthetically pleasing". Kitsch can also refer to "wearing or displaying something that is therefore no longer in fashion".

== Income ==
The median annual wages for salaried fashion designers was $79,290 in May 2023, approximately $38.12 per hour. The middle 50 percent earned an average of $76,700. The lowest 10 percent earned $37,090 and the highest 10 percent earned $160,850. The highest number of employment lies within Apparel, Piece Goods, and Notions Merchant Wholesalers with a percentage of 5.4. The average is 7,820 based on employment. The lowest employment is within Apparel Knitting Mills at .46% of the industry employed, which averages to 30 workers within the specific specialty. In 2016, 23,800 people were counted as fashion designers in the United States.

Geographically, the largest employment state of Fashion designers is New York with an employment of 7,930.

== Fashion industry ==
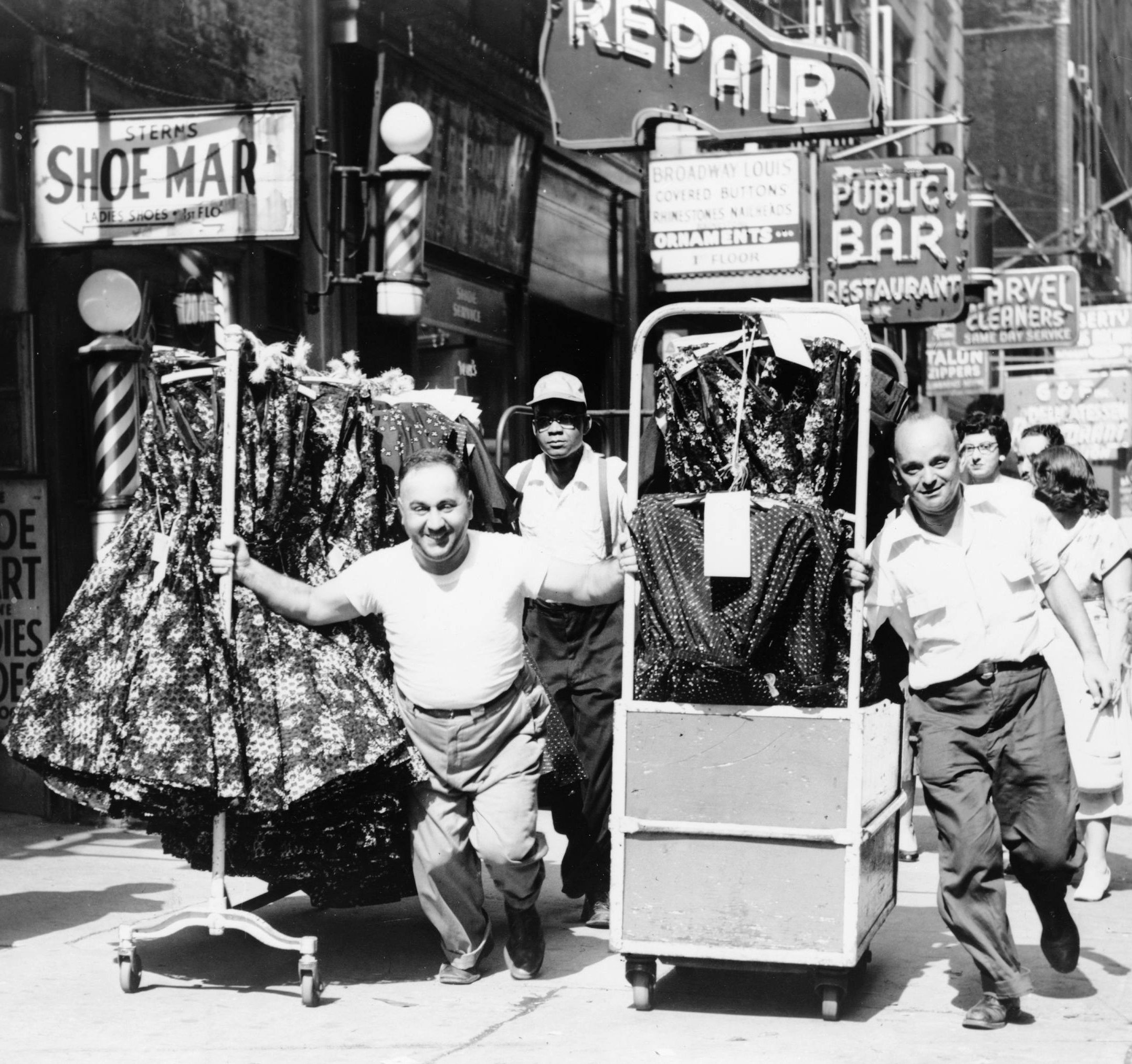
Men pulling carts of women's clothing in Garment District, New York, 1955

Fashion today is a global industry, and most major countries have a fashion industry. Seven countries have established an international reputation in fashion: the United States, France, Italy, United Kingdom, Japan, Germany and Belgium. The "big four" fashion capitals of the fashion industry are New York City, Paris, Milan, and London.

=== United States ===
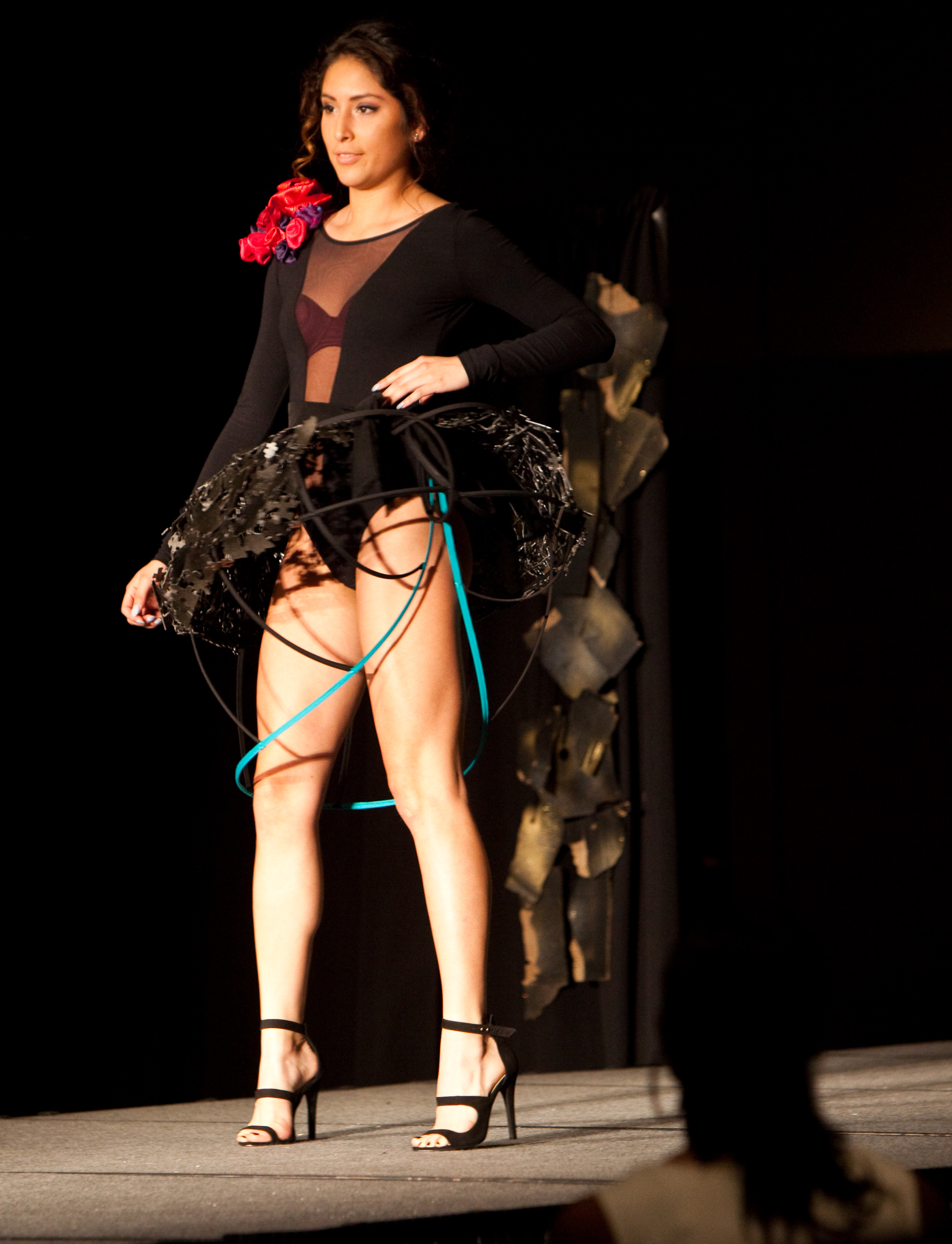
Fashion show at a fashion designing college, US, 2015

The United States is home to the largest, wealthiest, and most multi-faceted fashion industry. Most fashion houses in the United States are based in New York City, with a high concentration centered in the Garment District neighborhood. On the US west coast, there is also to a lesser extent a significant number of fashion houses in Los Angeles, where a substantial percentage of high fashion clothing manufactured in the United States is actually made. Miami has also emerged as a new fashion hub, especially regarding swimwear and other beach-oriented fashion. A semi-annual event held every February and September, New York Fashion Week is the oldest of the four major fashion weeks held throughout the world. Parsons The New School for Design, located in the Greenwich Village neighborhood of Lower Manhattan in New York City, is considered one of the top fashion schools in the world. There are numerous fashion magazines published in the United States and distributed to a global readership. Examples include Vogue, Harper's Bazaar, and Cosmopolitan.

American fashion design is highly diverse, reflecting the enormous ethnic diversity of the population, but is largely dominated by a clean-cut, urban, hip aesthetic, and often favors a more casual style, reflecting the athletic, health-conscious lifestyles of the suburban and urban middle classes. The annual Met Gala ceremony in Manhattan is widely regarded as the world's most prestigious haute couture fashion event and is a venue where fashion designers and their creations are celebrated. Social media is also a place where fashion is presented most often. Some influencers are paid huge amounts of money to promote a product or clothing item, where the business hopes many viewers will buy the product off the back of the advertisement. Instagram is the most popular platform for advertising, but Facebook, Snapchat, Twitter and other platforms are also used. In New York, the LGBT fashion design community contributes very significantly to promulgating fashion trends, and drag celebrities have developed a profound influence upon New York Fashion Week.

Prominent American brands and designers include Calvin Klein, Ralph Lauren, Coach, Nike, Vans, Marc Jacobs, Tommy Hilfiger, DKNY, Tom Ford, Caswell-Massey, Michael Kors, Levi Strauss and Co., Estée Lauder, Revlon, Kate Spade, Alexander Wang, Vera Wang, Victoria's Secret, Tiffany and Co., Converse, Oscar de la Renta, John Varvatos, Anna Sui, Prabal Gurung, Bill Blass, Halston, Carhartt, Brooks Brothers, Stuart Weitzman, Diane von Furstenberg, J. Crew, American Eagle Outfitters, Steve Madden, Abercrombie and Fitch, Juicy Couture, Thom Browne, Guess, Supreme, and The Timberland Company.

=== Belgium ===
In the late 1980s and early 1990s, Belgian fashion designers brought a new fashion image that mixed East and West, and brought a highly individualised, personal vision on fashion. Well known Belgian designers are the Antwerp Six: Ann Demeulemeester, Dries Van Noten, Dirk Bikkembergs, Dirk Van Saene, Walter Van Beirendonck and Marina Yee, as well as Martin Margiela, Raf Simons, Kris Van Assche, Bruno Pieters, Anthony Vaccarello.

=== United Kingdom ===
British fashion refers to the distinctive styles, design, and aesthetic values that have developed across the United Kingdom, drawing on the diverse cultural traditions, craftsmanship, and materials of England, Scotland, Wales, and Northern Ireland. Renowned for its blend of heritage and innovation, British fashion has played a significant role in shaping global trends; from the formal tailoring of Savile Row to the rebellious subcultures of mod and punk. It reflects the complex historical social structures, regional identities, and evolving cultural attitudes found throughout the UK.

In the 18th and 19th centuries, London became a hub for refined tailoring, while Scottish tweed, Welsh wool, and Irish linen industries supplied essential materials. Victorian and Edwardian fashion reflected strict class-based dress codes, while the 20th century brought dramatic shifts, from wartime utility to the avant-garde spirit of designers like Mary Quant and Vivienne Westwood, who captured the boldness of youth culture and challenged conventions.

Today, British fashion remains highly influential on the world stage, and celebrated for its diversity, creativity, and historical depth. The UK is home to globally recognised fashion houses, prestigious fashion schools, and high-street brands with international reach, while events like London Fashion Week showcase both established designers and emerging talent. Contemporary British fashion encompasses a wide range of styles, from sustainable and minimalist to eccentric and vintage-inspired, often engaging with contemporary issues of identity, inclusion, and environmental responsibility.

=== France ===
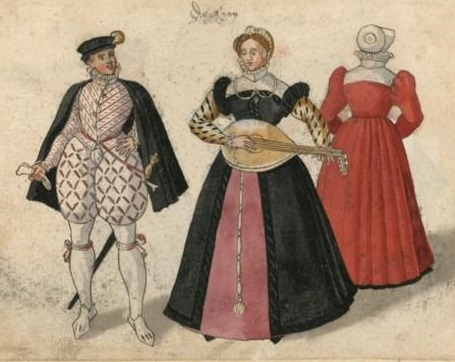
French fashion

Fashion in France is an important subject in the culture and country's social life, as well as being an important part of its economy.

Fashion design and production became prominent in France since 15th century. During the 17th century, fashion exploded into a rich industry, for exportation and local consumption. In the 19th century, fashion made a transition into specialisation for modern term haute couture, originated in the 1860s, bringing good taste to fashion argot. The term prêt-à-porter was born in the 1960s, reacting against the traditional notions of fashion and garment-making process, satisfying the needs of pop culture and mass media.

Paris acts as the center of the fashion industry and holds the name of global fashion capital. The city is home to many prime designers, including Chanel, Louis Vuitton, Givenchy, Balmain, Christian Louboutin, Pierre Cardin, Yves Saint Laurent, Roger Vivier, Thierry Mugler, Christian Dior, Jean Paul Gaultier, Hermès, Lanvin, Chloé, Rochas, and Céline.

=== Spain ===
Madrid and Barcelona are the main fashion centers in Spain. Spanish fashion is often more conservative and traditional but also more 'timeless' than other fashion cultures. Spaniards are known not to take great risks when dressing. Nonetheless, many of the fashion brands and designers coming from Spain.

=== Germany ===
German fashion is known for its emerging designers and manufacturers of sports and outdoor clothing, ready-to-wear and custom-made creations.

Berlin, the country's capital city, is also a fashion capital of the world and the home of Berlin Fashion Week, the country's main event where young and creative German fashion designers showcase unique creations. Other important cities to the German fashion landscape are Munich, Hamburg and Cologne. Smaller places such as Herford, Metzingen, Herzogenaurach, Schorndorf, Chemnitz, Albstadt and Detmold are also important design and production hubs of the German fashion industry.

=== India ===
Most of the Indian fashion houses are in Mumbai; Lakme Fashion Week is considered one of the premier fashion events in the country. Lakme Fashion Week in India takes place twice a year and is held in the populous city of Mumbai. The first show occurs during April featuring summer collections. The second show takes place in August to showcase the winter collection. Lakme, a cosmetic brand for Indian women, hosts the event. This fashion week started in 1999 and originally partnered with the FDCI; the Fashion Design Council of India then later switched to a sponsorship with Lakme.

=== Italy ===
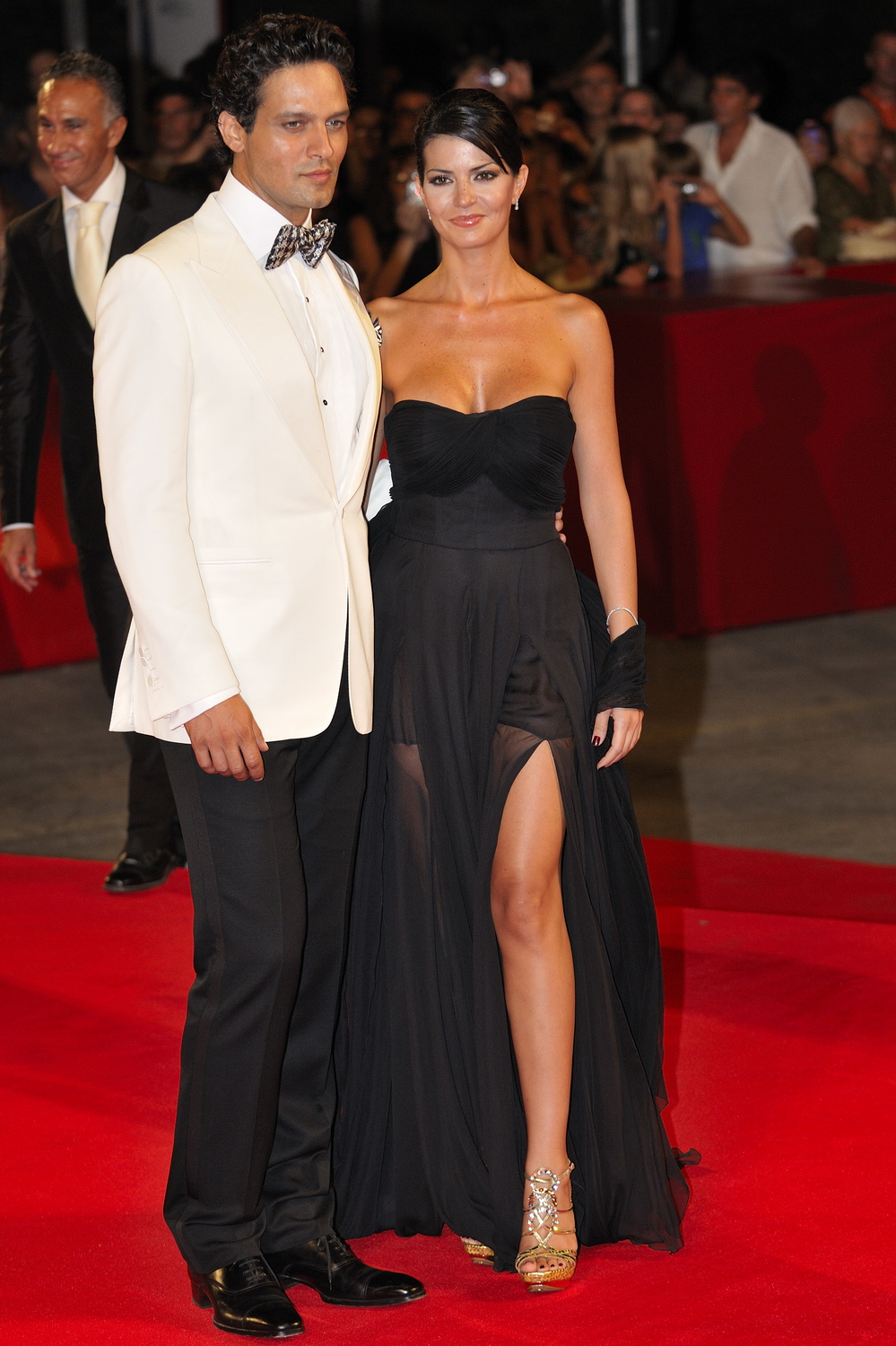
Red carpet fashion: Italian actors Gabriel Garko and Laura Torrisi wearing designer formal wear at Venice Film Festival, 2009

Milan is Italy's fashion capital. Most of the older Italian couturiers are in Rome. However, Milan and Florence are the Italian fashion capitals, and it is the exhibition venue for their collections. Italian fashion features casual and glamorous elegance. In Italy, Milan Fashion Week takes place twice a year in February and September. Milan Fashion week puts fashion in the spotlight and celebrates it in the heart of Milan with fashion lovers, buyers and media.

=== Japan ===
Most Japanese fashion houses are in Tokyo which is home to Tokyo Fashion Week, Asia's largest fashion week. The Japanese look is loose and unstructured (often resulting from complicated cutting), colors tend to be sombre and subtle, and richly textured fabrics. Famous Japanese designers include Kenzo Takada, Issey Miyake, Yohji Yamamoto and Rei Kawakubo.

=== China ===
Chinese clothing has historically been associated with lower quality both inside and outside China, leading to a stigma on Chinese brands. Due to government censorship, Chinese citizens were only able to access fashion magazines in the 1990s. However, as more and more Chinese designers matriculate from the world's top fashion schools, Chinese designers such as Shushu/Tong and Rui Zhou have made their way into the world's top fashion weeks, and Shanghai has become a fashion hub in China. In the early 2020s, Gen Z shoppers pioneered the guochao (Chinese: 国潮; pinyin: Guó cháo) movement, a trend of preferring homegrown designers which incorporate aspects of Chinese history and culture. Hong Kong clothing brand Shanghai Tang's design concept is inspired by Chinese clothing and set out to rejuvenate Chinese fashion of the 1920s and 30s, with a modern twist of the 21st century and its usage of bright colours. Additionally, a revival in interest in traditional Han clothing has led to interest in haute couture clothing with historical Chinese details, particularly around Chinese New Year.

=== Russian fashion ===
Russian fashion is diverse and reflects contemporary fashion norms as well as the historical evolution of clothing across the Russian Federation. Russian fashion is thought to be influenced by the state's former socialist ideology, the various cultures within Russia, and the cultures of surrounding regions.

=== Switzerland ===
Most of the Swiss fashion houses are in Zürich.

=== Mexico ===
In the development of Mexican indigenous dress, the fabrication was determined by the materials and resources that are available in specific regions, impacting the "fabric, shape and construction of a people's clothing". Textiles were created from plant fibers including cotton and agave. Class status differentiated what fabric was worn. Mexican dress was influenced by geometric shapes to create the silhouettes. Huipil a blouse characterized by a "loose, sleeveless tunic made of two or three joined webs of cloth sewn lengthwise" is an important historical garment, often seen today. After the Spanish Conquest, traditional Mexican clothing shifted to take on a Spanish resemblance.

Mexican indigenous groups rely on specific embroidery and colors to differentiate themselves from each other.

Mexican Pink is a significant color to the identity of Mexican art and design and general spirit. The term "Rosa Mexicano" as described by Ramón Valdiosera was established by prominent figures such as Dolores del Río and designer Ramón Val in New York.

When newspapers and magazines such as El Imparcial and El Mundo Ilustrado circulated in Mexico, it became a significant movement, as it informed the large cities, such as Mexico City, of European fashions. This encouraged the founding of department stores, changing the existing pace of fashion. With access to European fashion and dress, those with high social status relied on adopting those elements to distinguish themselves from the rest. Juana Catarina Romero was a successful entrepreneur and pioneer in this movement.

== Terms ==
- A fashion designer conceives garment combinations of line, proportion, color, and texture. While sewing and pattern-making skills are beneficial, they are not a prerequisite of successful fashion design. Most fashion designers are formally trained or apprenticed.
- A technical designer works with the design team and the factories overseas to ensure correct garment construction, appropriate fabric choices and a good fit. The technical designer fits the garment samples on a fit model, and decides which fit and construction changes to make before mass-producing the garment.
- A pattern maker (also referred to as pattern master or pattern cutter) drafts the shapes and sizes of a garment's pieces. This may be done manually with paper and measuring tools or by using a CAD computer software program. Another method is to drape fabric directly onto a dress form. The resulting pattern pieces can be constructed to produce the intended design of the garment and required size. Formal training is usually required for working as a pattern marker.
- A tailor makes custom-designed garments made to the client's measure; especially suits (coat and trousers, jacket and skirt, et cetera). Tailors usually undergo an apprenticeship or other formal training.
- A textile designer designs fabric weaves and prints for clothes and furnishings. Most textile designers are formally trained as apprentices and in school.
- A stylist co-ordinates the clothes, jewelry, and accessories used in fashion photography and catwalk presentations. A stylist may also work with an individual client to design a coordinated wardrobe of garments. Many stylists are trained in fashion design, the history of fashion, and historical costume, and have a high level of expertise in the current fashion market and future market trends. However, some simply have a strong aesthetic sense for pulling great looks together.
- A fashion buyer selects and buys the mix of clothing available in retail shops, department stores, and chain stores. Most fashion buyers are trained in business and/or fashion studies.
- A seamstress sews ready-to-wear or mass-produced clothing by hand or with a sewing machine, either in a garment shop or as a sewing machine operator in a factory. She (or he) may not have the skills to make (design and cut) the garments, or to fit them on a model.
- A dressmaker specializes in custom-made women's clothes: day, cocktail, and evening dresses, business clothes and suits, trousseaus, sports clothes, and lingerie.
- A fashion forecaster predicts what colours, styles and shapes will be popular ("on-trend") before the garments are on sale in stores.
- A model wears and displays clothes at fashion shows and in photographs.
- A fit model aids the fashion designer by wearing and commenting on the fit of clothes during their design and pre-manufacture. Fit models need to be a particular size for this purpose.
- A fashion journalist writes fashion articles describing the garments presented or fashion trends, for magazines or newspapers.
- A fashion photographer produces photographs about garments and other fashion items along with models and stylists for magazines or advertising agencies.

== See also ==
- Fashion – Stylish clothing
- Fashion design copyright – Legal rights of fashion designs
- History of western fashion
- List of fashion designers
- List of fashion education programs
- List of fashion topics
- Met Gala – Annual fundraising gala held in New York City
- List of individual dresses
- Runway (fashion) – Event of displaying latest clothing and apparel collection
- Deconstruction (fashion) – Abstracted clothing style of the 1980s–90s
- Sustainable fashion – Reduction of environmental impacts of the fashion industry
- Textile design – Creation of designs for the manufacturing of woven, knitted or printed fabrics
- Time 100 – Annual list of influential people
- Western dress codes – Set of Western dress codes

== Bibliography ==
- Breward, Christopher (1995). The Culture of Fashion: A New History of Fashionable Dress. Distributed exclusively in the USA by Palgrave. Manchester, New York: Manchester University Press. ISBN 9780719041259.
- Hollander, Anne L. (2009). Seeing Through Clothes (8th printing ed.). Berkeley: University of California Press. ISBN 9780520082311.
- Hollander, Anne L. (2020). Sex and Suits: The Evolution of Modern Dress. London: Bloomsbury Academic. doi:10.5040/9781474250641.
- Hollander, Anne L. (1999). Feeding the Eye: Essays (1st ed.). New York: Farrar, Straus and Giroux. ISBN 9780374282011.
- Hollander, Anne L. (2002). Fabric of Vision: Dress and Drapery in Painting. London: National Gallery. ISBN 9781857099072.
- Kawamura, Yuniya (2014). Fashion-ology: An Introduction to Fashion Studies (Reprint ed.). London: Bloomsbury. ISBN 9781859738146.
- Lipovetsky, Gilles (2001). The Empire of Fashion: Dressing Modern Democracy. Princeton, N.J.: Princeton University Press. ISBN 9780691102627.
- McDermott, Kathleen, Style for all: why fashion, invented by kings, now belongs to all of us (An illustrated history), 2010, ISBN 978-0-557-51917-0 — Many hand-drawn color illustrations, extensive annotated bibliography and reading guide
- Mckay Rosenberg, Dawn. "Fashion designer job description: Salary, skills, & more". The Balance Careers.
- Perrot, Philippe; Bienvenu, Richard (1994). Fashioning the Bourgeoisie: A History of Clothing in the Nineteenth Century. Princeton, N.J.: Princeton University Press. ISBN 9780691033839.
- Steele, Valerie (2017). Paris Fashion: A Cultural History (Revised ed.). New York: Bloomsbury USA. ISBN 9781474245487.
- Steele, Valerie (1997). Fifty Years of Fashion: New Look to Now (2nd printing ed.). New Haven, Conn.: Yale University Press. ISBN 9780300071320.
- Steele, Valerie (2005). Encyclopedia of Clothing and Fashion. Farmington Hills, MI: Charles Scribner's Sons. ISBN 9780684313948.
- Strijbos, Bram (2021-05-10). "All the news about Milan Fashion Week on FashionUnited". FashionUnited.
- Sterlacci, Francesca. "What is a fashion designer?". LoveToKnow: Fashion History.
