= Anne Hollander =

American historian

- Hollander in 1999
- Born: Anne Helen Loesser; October 16, 1930; Cleveland, Ohio, U.S.
- Died: July 6, 2014 (aged 83); New York City, U.S.
- Education: Barnard College (BA)
- Known for: History of fashion, costume and art
- Spouse(s): John Hollander (div.); Thomas Nagel (m. 1979)
- Children: Martha Hollander, Elizabeth Hollander

Anne Helen Loesser Hollander (October 16, 1930 – July 6, 2014) was an American historian whose original work provided new insights into the history of fashion and costume and their relation to the history of art. She published numerous books on the history of fashion, modernity, and the body including Seeing Through Clothes and Sex and Suits.

== Early life ==
Hollander was born Anne Helen Loesser in Cleveland, Ohio. She was the only child of pianist and music historian Arthur Loesser and his wife Jean Bassett, a sculptor. Hollander's mother taught her to sew and make her own clothes. Hollander received a degree in art history from Barnard College, New York, graduating in 1952.

== Career ==
Hollander moved in academic circles but never joined a college or university faculty. She became an independent scholar, researching and writing on the history of fashion and costume. Her work was both erudite and original, providing new perspectives on areas that previously had not been considered or had been regarded as unimportant. Her first book was Seeing through clothes (1978; reprinted 1993) where she insisted on talking about cloth and drapery before talking about clothes.

Hollander describes the relationship between dress and art as follows: "In a picture-making civilization, the ongoing pictorial conventions demonstrate what is natural in human looks; and it is only in measuring up to them that the inner eye feels satisfaction and the clothed self achieves comfort and beauty". And she extends the point to the conception of the naked body: "It can be shown that the rendering of the nude in art usually derives from the current form in which the clothed figure is conceived. This correlation in turn demonstrates that both the perception and the self-perception of nudity are dependent on a sense of clothing – and of clothing understood through the medium of a visual convention". "Thus all nudes in art since modern fashion began are wearing the ghosts of absent clothes – sometimes highly visible ghosts".

In her second book, Moving pictures (1991), Hollander divided post-1500 paintings from Europe and the United States into the cinematic and non-cinematic. In Sex and suits (1994), she analysed the male suit and its function. In 2002, Hollander helped organise the exhibition "Fabric of Vision: Dress and Drapery in Painting" at the National Gallery in London, for which she wrote the catalogue. Her interest, as with other works where she considered painting, was not in the techniques used by artists to depict clothing, but in what those depictions revealed about the changing idea of the human body underneath. Hollander's thesis was always that clothes reveal more than they conceal. She held to this view even when considering the burqa worn by Muslim women, which she saw as revealing many details if one looked closely.

Starting in the 1970s Hollander was a regular reviewer for The New Republic, the London Review of Books, the New York Review of Books, and other periodicals, and in the late 1990s she was the fashion columnist for Slate. She was a fellow of the NYU New York Institute for the Humanities and was president of the PEN American Center in the 1990s.

== Personal life ==
Hollander married the poet John Hollander in 1953. They were divorced in 1977. They have two daughters: Martha Hollander, a poet and art historian, and Elizabeth Hollander, a literary scholar. In 1979, Hollander married the philosopher Thomas Nagel. Nagel commented on his wife's meticulous attention to detail about her own appearance: "She thought it was an art" he said, adding that she believed people should check their appearance from all angles: "She thought you should always use the double mirror before you leave the house".

== Death ==
Hollander died from cancer at her home in Manhattan. At the time of her death, she was working on a book about costume in literature, from Homer to the present.

== Selected publications ==
- Seeing through clothes. Viking, 1978. ISBN 0670631744
- Moving pictures. Cambridge, Harvard University Press, 1991. ISBN 0674588282
- Sex and suits. New York, Knopf, 1994. ISBN 0679430962
- Feeding the eye: Essays. University of California Press, 2000. ISBN 0520226593
- Fabric of vision: Dress and drapery in painting. National Gallery, London, 2002. ISBN 1857099079

== See also ==
- History of fashion
