= Deconstruction (fashion) =

Abstracted clothing style of the 1980s–90s

Deconstruction (or deconstructivism) is a fashion phenomenon of the 1980s and 1990s. It involves the use of costume forms that are based on identifying the structure of clothing - they are used as an external element of the costume. This phenomenon is associated with designers Martin Margiela, Yohji Yamamoto, Rei Kawakubo, Karl Lagerfeld, Ann Demeulemeester, Dries van Noten and Helmut Lang. Deconstructivism in fashion is considered as part of a philosophical system formed under the influence of the works of Jacques Derrida.

== Term ==
In fashion, the term "deconstructivism" emerged in the second half of the 1980s and early 1990s. The principles of this direction were outlined in 1985 in Harold Koda's article "Rei Kawakubo and the Aesthetics of Poverty". In the early 1990s, Harold Koda and Richard Martin introduced the concept of fashion deconstruction in the Infra-Apparel exhibition catalog, where "deconstructivism" was described as a unified trend of the 1990s. It is believed that the term "deconstructivism" in relation to fashion began to be used after an architectural exhibition in 1988 at the Museum of Modern Art in New York. The work that summarized the basic principles of deconstructivism in the 1990s can be considered the text by Alison Gill "Deconstruction Fashion: The Making of Unfinished, Decomposing and Re-Assembled Clothes". Gill defined deconstruction in fashion as a term to describe "garments on a runway that are unfinished, coming apart, recycled, transparent or grunge".

== General principles ==
=== Origin ===
Deconstructivism is considered one of the most influential fashion trends of the 1980s and 1990s. It arose as a reaction to continental philosophy and can be seen as one of the attempts to present fashion as an intellectual movement. Designers and critics have emphasized the alternative nature of fashion deconstruction to commercial or runway fashion, although this opposition is rather relative. Deconstructivism was focused not so much on the mechanism and rules of the fashion industry, but on philosophy and architecture.

=== Basic elements ===
Deconstructivism is associated with the emergence of a new cutting technique that emphasized the structural elements of the costume. At the same time, deconstruction is considered a protest against the style of the 1980s. It is assessed as an attempt to create a new direction in costume both in terms of shaping and in the sense of creating a new fashion ideology. Deconstructivism involves identifying elements of cut in the external appearance of a suit.

=== Designers ===
There are different points of view as to which designers should be considered representatives of deconstruction in fashion. The list of main participants is ambiguous. In some cases, it is limited to representatives of the "Antwerp Six", with special emphasis on such names as Martin Margiela and Ann Demeulemeester.

=== Deconstructivism and the concept of intellectual fashion ===
The idea of resistance, embedded within the framework of deconstruction, implied the desire to see fashion as an intellectual sphere. The structure of the costume was represented by the intellectual side of the clothing. Under the influence of deconstruction, a new strategy was formed in fashion - an understanding of fashion as an intellectual phenomenon.

== Deconstruction in fashion and architecture ==
The emergence of deconstructivism in fashion is associated with the architectural tradition. The starting point is considered to be the exhibition "Deconstructivist Architecture", which took place at the Museum of Modern Art in New York in 1988. The exhibition presented works by then little-known artists Rem Koolhaas, Zaha Hadid, Frank Gehry, Peter Eisenman, Daniel Libeskind and Bernard Tschumi.

== Deconstructivism in fashion and philosophy ==
Deconstructivism in fashion is usually correlated with deconstruction as a philosophical movement - primarily with the works of Jacques Derrida. Fashionable deconstructivism is presented as a rethinking of the philosophical method formed by representatives of the European and Yale schools. Fashion deconstruction also implies that the fashion system in general, and costume in particular, is erroneously thought of as a structure. Deconstruction in fashion was part of a philosophical movement where the ideas of deconstruction could be expressed in applied forms. For fashion, turning to the philosophy of deconstruction was one of the ways to confirm its intellectual status.

== Deconstruction and the idea of disorder ==
Deconstructivism in fashion was not a protest against the idea of order as such. It developed as resistance to a certain type of order: deconstructivism assumed the possibility of decentralization of the system (including the fashion system) and the possibility of verifying externally established rules. In fashionable deconstruction, the disorderly was part of an established system. Fashionable deconstruction positioned clutter as a structural element.

== Deconstruction and anti-fashion ==
Deconstructivism in costume has become one of the consistent trends built on opposition to the idea of fashion. It became a form of criticism of standard commercial clothing and implied the possibility of a system focused on a philosophical prototype. Deconstructivism suggested the possibility of a new social reference point for fashion. In addition, deconstructivism was one of the first large-scale movements that outlined the very possibility of alternative fashion.

== See also ==
- Antwerp Six
- Martin Margiela
- 1980s in fashion
- 1990s in fashion

== Sources ==
- Brunette P., Wills D. Deconstruction and the Visual Arts: Art, Media, Architecture. Cambridge: Cambridge University Press, 1994.
- Cunningham B. Fashion du Siècle // Details, 1990, No. 8. pp. 177–300.
- Koda H. Rei Kawakubo and the Aesthetic of Poverty / Costume: Journal of Costume Society of America, 1985, No. 11, pp. 5–10.
- Martin R., Koda H. Infra-Apparel. [Exhibition catalogue]. New York: Metropolitan Museum of Art, 1993.
- O'Shea S. La mode Destroy // Vogue (Paris), 1992, May.
- O'Shea S. 1991. Recycling: An All-New Fabrication of Style // Elle, 1991, No. 2, pp. 234–239.
