= Arthur Loesser =

American classical pianist, musicologist, and writer

Arthur Adolph Loesser (August 26, 1894 – January 5, 1969) was an American classical pianist, musicologist, and writer.

== Early life ==
Born into a musical family in New York City, Loesser received early piano training from his German-born father until he began lessons with Zygmunt Stojowski at the Institute of Musical Art, now called the Juilliard School.

== Career ==
Loesser was the author of the books Humor in American Song and Men, Women, and Pianos: A Social History. He also wrote program notes for the Cleveland Orchestra and liner notes for recordings by Vladimir Horowitz and other musicians.

Loesser served on the faculty of the Cleveland Institute of Music beginning in 1926. From 1953 until his death in 1969, he was head of the piano department. His pupils included Sergio Calligaris, Anton Kuerti, and Jane Corner Young.

As a pianist, Loesser gave numerous concerts and recitals, his first during 1913 in Berlin. He often coupled his recitals with lectures which were known for their wit. He was active during the 1920s and 1930s as one half of a piano duo with the Canadian pianist and conductor Wilfrid Pelletier. The two made a number of piano rolls for the American Piano Company's "AMPICO" reproducing piano system; these were piano duet arrangements of orchestral works that were literally "conducted" by Pelletier's Metropolitan Opera colleague Arthur Bodanzky. He also made several solo recordings, some of which have been issued on compact disc.

Arthur Loesser wrote Men, Women & Pianos: A Social History which was published by Simon & Schuster in 1954.

== Army service ==
During World War II, from 1943, Loesser served in the US Army where he worked in the Japanese intelligence department. It was during this period that he mastered the Japanese language and after the war ended he gave recitals with lectures in Tokyo. Loesser eventually retired from the army with the rank of major.

== Personal life ==
Arthur Loesser was the half-brother of Broadway composer Frank Loesser. He jokingly described Frank as "the evil of two Loessers".

Loesser was married to Jean Basset; the couple had one daughter, fashion historian Anne Hollander.

Loesser died from a heart attack at the wheel of his car outside the Cleveland Institute of Music on January 4, 1969, aged 74.
