= Antwerp Six =

Group of Belgian fashion designers

The Antwerp Six in 2013: From left: Marina Yee, Dries Van Noten, Ann Demeulemeester, Dirk Bikkembergs, Walter Van Beirendonck, Dirk Van Saene

The Antwerp Six are a group of fashion designers who trained at Antwerp's Royal Academy of Fine Arts between 1980–1981 under Mary Prijot. The press began referring to them as a group beginning in about 1990 after the group in 1986 drove in a van from Belgium to present at a London tradeshow and unexpectedly made an impression.

== Members ==
- Walter Van Beirendonck
- Ann Demeulemeester
- Dries Van Noten
- Dirk Van Saene
- Dirk Bikkembergs
- Marina Yee

== History ==
The fashion collective presented a distinct, radical vision for fashion during the 1980s that established Antwerp as a notable location for fashion design. The breakthrough occurred in 1986 as the group rented a truck and set out for the London Fashion Week with their collections. The reporters could not pronounce their names so began collectively referring to them as the Antwerp Six. Shortly after, the 6 were becoming famous in the fashion world due to their unity and curious designs; quickly making a sale to legendary department store Barneys New York. They returned to London frequently as their fame and name (on account of the Brits inability to pronounce their Flemish names) rose rapidly. In fashion and design, the Six was characterized by Van Noten's rich floral patterns, Van Saene's surrealist artworks, Demeulemeester's curious mix of sharp contrasts and romanticism, Van Beirendonck's colourful and quirky patterns, Yee's radically deconstructed tailoring, and Bikkembergs' massively popular footwear line.

Now in their 60s, four of the Antwerp Six continue to work, though most have turned to other art forms. Dries Van Noten retired from his fashion house in 2024, but will soon open a residency and exhibition space dedicated to general skill across the arts, with his partner Patrick Vangheluwe. Ann Demeulemeester stepped down from her fashion house more than 10 years ago and turned her artistic passion to porcelain. Now living with her husband, Patrick Robyn, she has launched her own line of furniture that matches her black-and-white aesthetic. Walter Van Beirendonck is the only member of the Six who still designs collections; Belgian retailer JBC announced, last autumn, that 5000 sweater designed by him would be available in an Antwerp store, they sold out in an hour. He lives in the Campine region with his husband and fellow Sixer Dirk Van Saene. Dirk Van Saene is mostly a sculptor and painter these days, selling his work at the famed Gallery Sofie Van de Velde in Antwerp. He is married with fellow Sixer Walter Van Beirendonck, whom he met at the fashion department about 55 years ago. Dirk Bikkembergs is the only member who has fully embraced retirement. "Enjoying his time not doing anything", he splits his time between his houses in Rio de Janeiro and Cape Town. Marina Yee was the member of the Six most known for being discreet and independent. Yee passed away from cancer in November 2025. She had returned to creating collections a few years before, following many years of teaching in local art schools. She lived in Antwerp, where she was born, at the time of her death.

Martin Margiela, another Belgian contemporary, was not actually part of the group that showed in London, although he is often mistakenly described as one of the Antwerp Six because he also emerged from the Antwerp scene immediately before the "Antwerp six" came to being. He subsequently moved to Paris, initially working for Jean Paul Gaultier and then opening his own label.

From 28 March 2026 — 17 January 2027, MoMu Fashion Museum Antwerp will exhibit The Antwerp Six celebrating the 40^{th} anniversary of the group.
