= Dries van Noten =

Belgian fashion designer (born 1958)

Coordinates: 51.2180817°N 4.4006012°E

Dries Van Noten
- Coat of arms of Dries Van Noten
- Born: 12 May 1958 (age 68); Antwerp, Belgium
- Education: Royal Academy of Fine Arts, Antwerp
- Label: Dries Van Noten
- Partner: Patrick Vangheluwe
- Awards: 2008 International Designer of the Year Award from the Council of Fashion Designers of America
- Website: driesvannoten.com

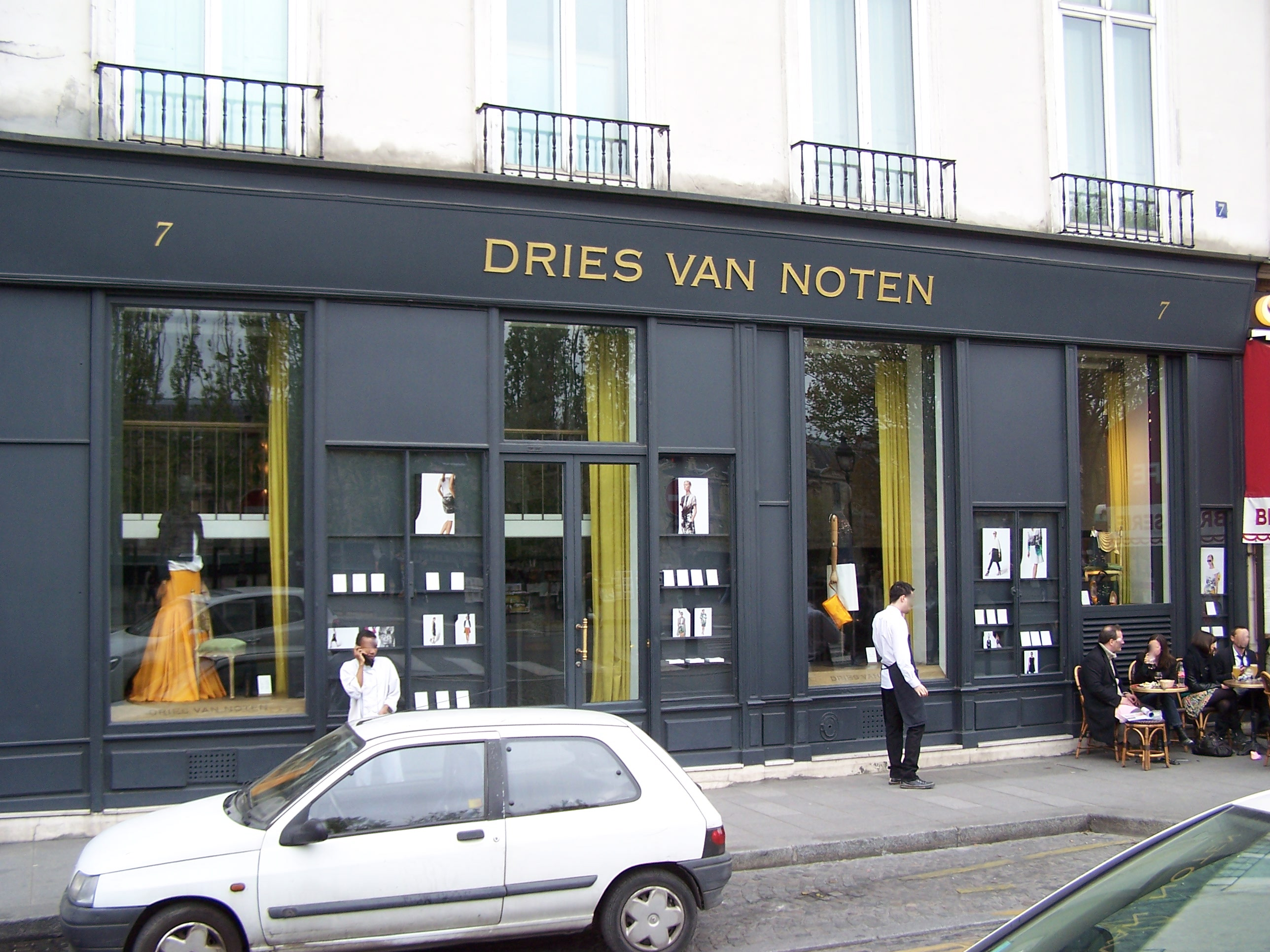
Boutique Dries Van Noten in Paris.

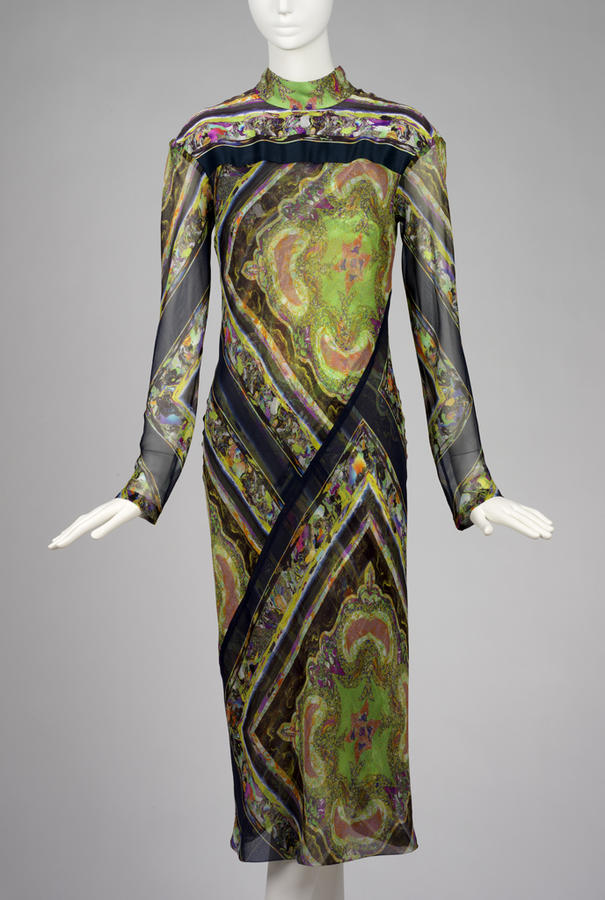
Printed silk dress by Dries van Noten, 2008

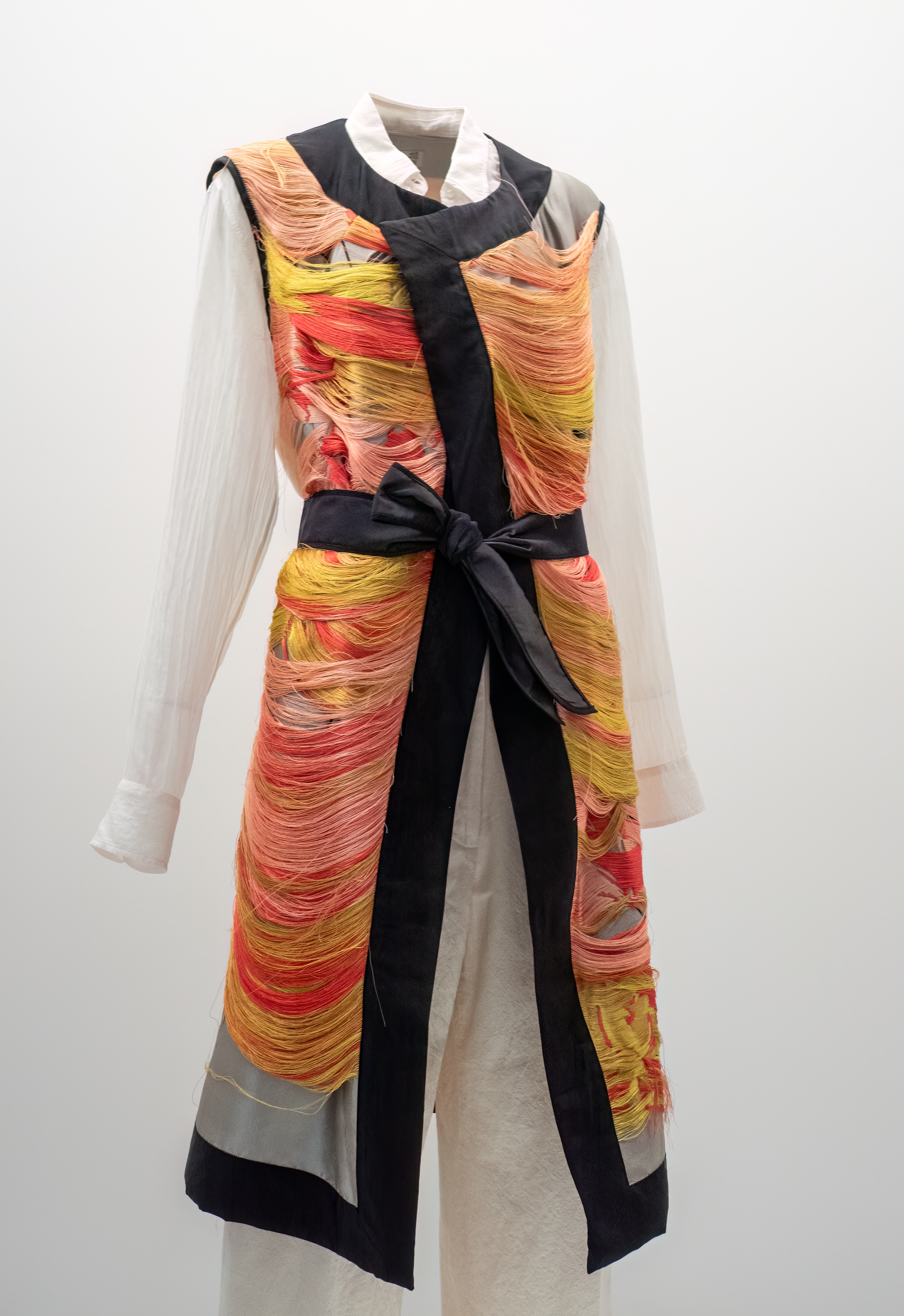
Spring/summer 2014 ensemble featured in the Sleeping Beauties: Reawakening Fashion exhibition at the Metropolitan Museum of Art

Dries Van Noten, Baron Van Noten (born 12 May 1958 in Antwerp) is a Belgian fashion designer and an eponymous fashion brand, which he co-founded with CEO and business partner Christine Mathys.

== Early life and education ==
Van Noten was born into a family of garment makers and traders – his father owned a menswear shop, while his grandfather was a tailor. He graduated in 1980 from the Royal Academy of Fine Arts in Antwerp.

== Career ==
Van Noten freelanced for a variety of local designers before launching a menswear line in 1986. That year, he presented his first menswear collection in London as part of The Antwerp Six collective. That led to a small order from Barneys New York. The Louis Boston firm was one of the first U.S. retailers to bring his clothes to America, carrying his collection and selling it in Boston. He currently creates four collections a year (men's and women's, both for summer and winter).

In 2005, The New York Times described him as "one of fashion's most cerebral designers". His style is said to be "eccentric", and fell out of favor during the long period of minimalistic fashion in the early 1990s, only to make a comeback towards the mid-2000s, culminating with Van Noten's winning of the International Award of the Council of Fashion Designers of America in 2008.

In 2008, Van Noten dressed actress Cate Blanchett for the Academy Awards, and he has continued to dress her for other red carpet events since then. Other notable customers include Queen Mathilde of Belgium, and actress Maggie Gyllenhaal. In 2018, the third episode of television show Killing Eve notably featured one of his items, known eponymously as the Dries van Noten suit.

The brand does not offer haute couture; all of its designs are ready to wear and available at retail: "I'm a little naive but I don't like the idea of showing things that you don't sell in a store", said Van Noten in a 2005 interview. His work is said to be characterized by use of prints, colors, original fabrics and layering. He does not advertise.

Van Noten's brand has shops in multiple locations worldwide. The first, opening in Antwerp in 1989, was Het Modepaleis. Shop openings in Hong Kong and Tokyo followed. In early 2007, a shop was opened in Paris, decorated with antiques collected by Van Noten and his partner Patrick Vangheluwe, followed ten months later by a shop in Singapore. The brand is said to be carried in some 400 fashion shops around the world.

As the brand is a private company, not much is known about its financial affairs, although it claimed in 2007 to have annual sales of some 30 million euro. In 2018, it was acquired by family-owned Spanish fragrance and fashion firm Puig; Van Noten himself remains a minority shareholder.

In March 2024, Van Noten announced his retirement from his namesake label after working in fashion for 38 years. His final collection was Menswear Spring/Summer 2025.

== Legacy ==
The Musée des Arts Décoratifs in Paris mounted an exhibition in 2014 devoted to Van Noten's designs and their influences, which later traveled to Antwerp. The show included 180 Van Noten pieces and 100 more paintings, garments and clips from outside collections.

== Honours ==
- 2008: International Designer of the Year Award from the Council of Fashion Designers of America.
- 2014: Officer of the Ordre des Arts et des Lettres of the French Republic.
- 2017: granted the Belgian noble title of baron by royal order of King Philippe of Belgium.

== Personal life ==
Van Noten and his partner Patrick Vangheluwe work and live in Antwerp. The couple resides in a house situated on a nearly seven-acre plot of land outside of the city.

In May 2025 he acquired the Palazzo Pisani Moretta in Venice (Italy).

== See also ==
- Deconstruction (fashion)
- Antwerp Six
