= Dirk Bikkembergs =

Belgian fashion designer

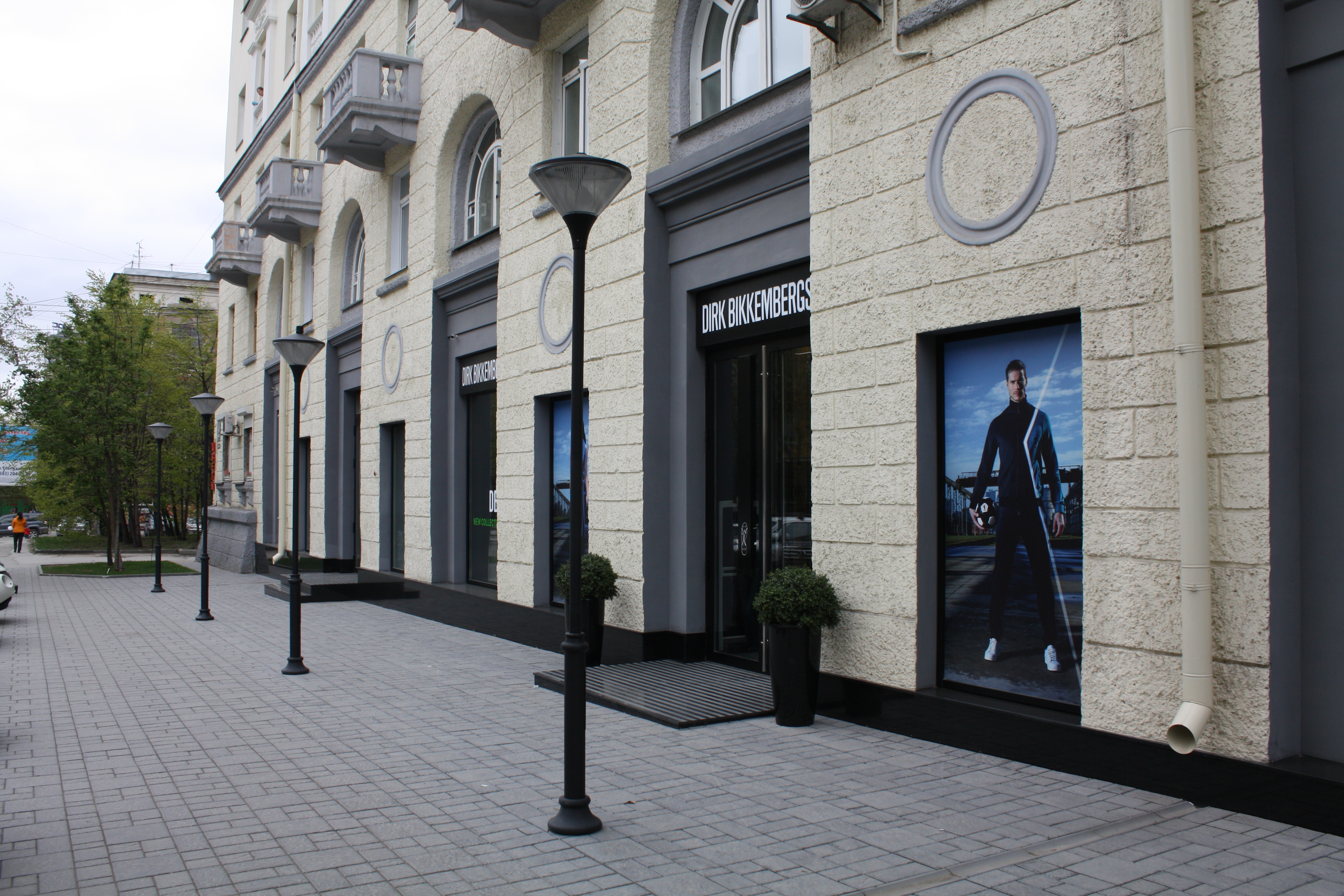
Clothing shops in Novosibirsk.

Dirk Bikkembergs (born 2 January 1959) is a Belgian fashion designer.

== Early life ==
Dirk Bikkembergs was born in Cologne, Germany, as his father was in the Belgian Army. He lived most of his years in Diepenbeek, Limburg, Belgium. In 1982, Bikkembergs graduated from the Royal Academy of Fine Arts in Antwerp, Belgium.

== Designer career ==
Men's blue and red strip linen jacket. Dirk Bikkembergs Homme purchased South Moulton Street, London circa 1997. Tassels no longer present.

In 1996, the Bikkembergs label was introduced to focus on football clothing. He was the first ever fashion designer to receive permission to hold a fashion show in a football stadium. Bikkembergs started using the team as his laboratory for styling and fabric technology. From exclusive jackets to high-performance underwear, all his designs are now tested and promoted by football players. The Dirk Bikkembergs Group's sponsorship of the team, now re-christened F.C. Bikkembergs Fossombrone, involved not only investment to bring in fresh talent, but also a revamp of their image.

== See also ==
- Antwerp Six
- List of fashion designers
