= Yuima Nakazato =

Japanese fashion designer (born 1985)

- ユイマナカザト
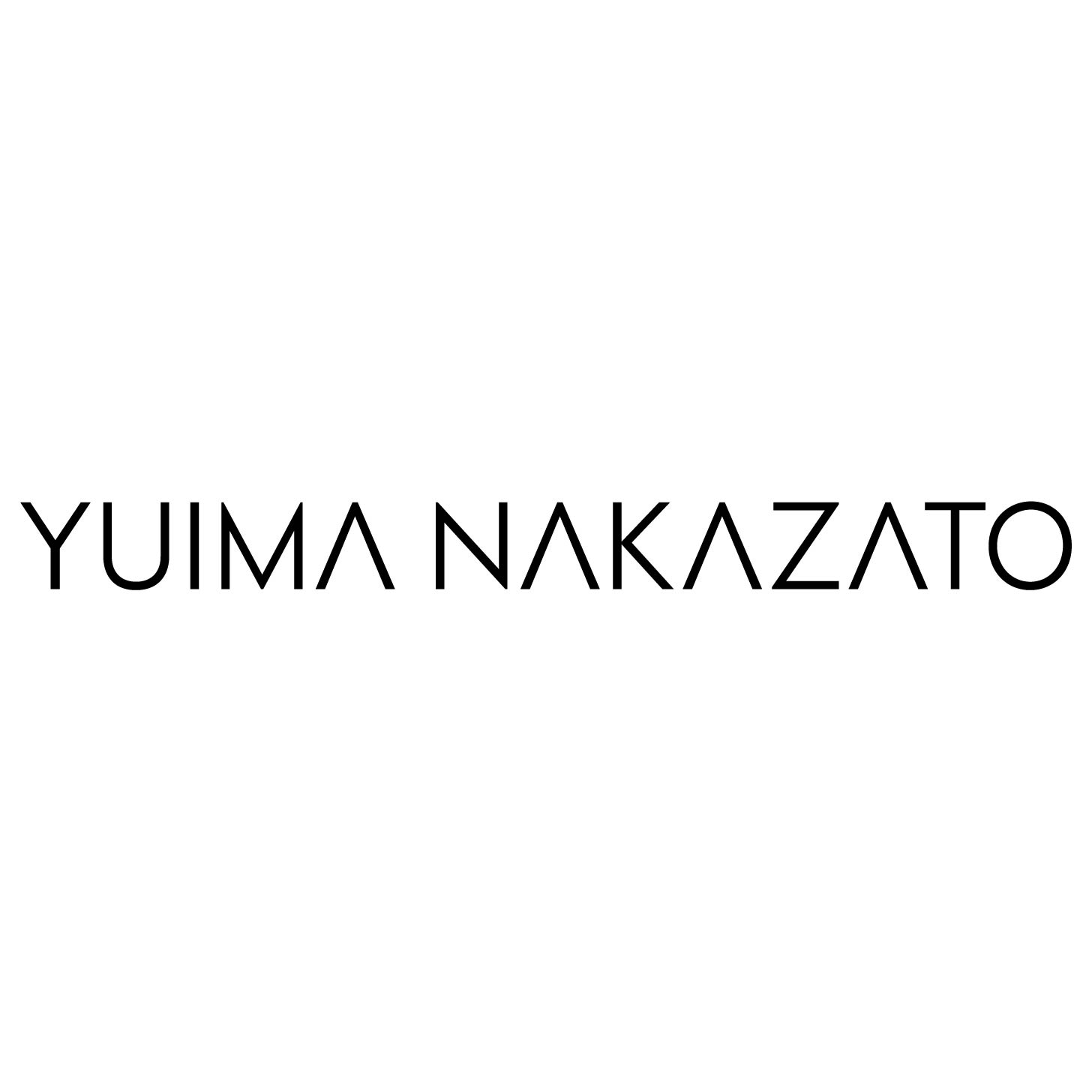
- Born: 29 September 1985 (age 40); Tokyo, Japan
- Education: Royal Academy of Fine Arts (Antwerp)
- Occupation: Fashion designer
- Website: https://www.yuimanakazato.com/

Yuima Nakazato (born 29 September 1985 in Tokyo) is a Japanese fashion designer and an eponymous fashion brand. As of 2023, he is the only guest member of Haute Couture Week from Japan.

== Early life and education ==
Yuima Nakazato was born in Tokyo to a family of a sculptor and a jewelry designer.

He began making clothes as a self-taught designer from his high school days before graduating from the Antwerp Royal Academy with a degree in fashion design in 2008. At the time, he was the youngest Japanese graduate from the program.

While at Antwerp, Nakazato instructors included Linda Loppa, Dries van Noten and Walter Van Beirendonck.

His graduation piece was awarded an Innovation Award from a designer Ann Demeulemeester for incorporated ideas from origami, where the dress changes into a three-dimensional sculptural piece when opened. Shoes that he designed as a student are preserved in ModeMuseum Antwerpen.

== Career ==
In 2009, Nakazato launched his eponymous label after becoming the only finalist in the history of ITS to be selected for two different competitions in different editions. That year, he presented his first collection at showroom in Antwerp together with other graduates from the Antwerp Academy including Demna Gvasalia.

Nakazato designed a costume for Fergie which she wore while performing in a world tour with the Black Eyed Peas in 2010. In October 2010, he presented his first runway collection at Yoyogi National Gymnasium in Tokyo. He went on to collaborate with Matthew Stone to create The Body Beyondo, a limited edition art book, which presented his 2012 S/S collection in 2011.

In 2016, Nakazato was invited by the Fédération de la Haute Couture et de la Mode to present his collection at the Haute Couture Week in Paris. This made him the second official guest member from Japan, following 12 years after Hanae Mori's inclusion.

The brand since then continues to present couture collections biannually as part of Haute Couture Week in Paris as of 2023.

In 2018, 21 21 Design Sight, a museum in Tokyo founded by Issey Miyake mounted Nakazato’s first exhibition ‘HARMONIZE’ devoted to reintroduce his couture works to Japanese audience and was visited by Issey Miyake.

Nakazato collaborated with Japan's Ministry of the Environment in 2021 to introduce an educational program on social responsibility and environmental issues in fashion design. The program's jury included Kazuyo Sejima and Ai Tominaga among others.

Since 2022, Nakazato began collaborating with choreographers and theatre directors to design costumes for Operas and Ballet productions in both US and Europe.

In 2022 Nakazato designed costume for Belgian choreographer Sidi Larbi Cherkaoui’s artistic directorial debut at Geneva Grand Theatre, immediately followed by his second collaboration with Cherkaoui for Hanjo, an opera produced by Bavarian State Opera in Munich.

In 2023, Nakazato designed costume for Boston Ballet’s new production La Mer, created by a Dutch choreographer Nanine Linning

In 2024, Nakazato designed costume for Geneva Grand Theatre's new production Idomeneo directed by Cherkaoui, making it his first costume design for the full opera production.

== Style ==
Yuima Nakazato’s work is at the intersection of innovation, tradition and cutting-edge technology. The designer develops sustainable fashion, inspired by the creativity of haute couture and traditional Japanese techniques. His poetic vision of clothing is driven by a desire to render bespoke creations more accessible.

Since his first collection, Nakazato has been creating pieces of clothes that are progressive, sustainable and able to create a unique emotional bond with the people who wear them. To achieve this, he develops techniques that he creates himself or uses from Eastern and Western craftsmanships. His inspiration, mainly drawn by nature recall the contribution of Asian thought through his work. The environmental impact of the fashion industry is one of Yuima Nakazato’s biggest concerns. His couture is a laboratory for a more responsible fashion, incorporating upcycling materials and waste that are not recycled by the industry. Alongside specialists, researchers and industrialists, he pushes back technological boundaries to develop innovative textiles and manufacturing processes, such as 3-D printing, creating textile fibres using fermented bacteria and implementing novel techniques.

== Legacy ==
In 2018 KCI (Kyoto Costume Institution) acquired one of looks from his first couture collection ‘Unknown’ as the museum’s permanent collection.

In 2020 MoMu praised ‘the Face to Face’ project, a charity project the brand presented as alternative to regular couture collection at Haute Couture Week during the pandemic, and purchased its custom made look as permanent collection.

In 2022 Museum für Kunst und Gewerbe Hamburg acquired one of bio-smocking looks from brand’s EVOKE couture collection as museums permanent collection.

In 2024 Cité de la Dentelle et de la Mode presented brand's first monographic exhibition, also making it the first exhibition for the museum to feature a Japanese fashion brand. Nakazato is the fourth Japanese fashion designer to have a retrospective held at a public art museum in France, following Issey Miyake, Yohji Yamamoto and Hanae Mori, being the youngest among them.

== Couture Collections ==
2016: UNKNOWN – autumn-winter 2016-2017 6 July, Palais de Tokyo

2017: IGNIS, AER, AQUA, TERRA – spring-summer 2017 23 January, Maison des métallos

FREEDOM – autumn-winter 2017-2018 5 July, House of Culture of Japan in Paris

2018: HARMONIZE – spring-summer 2018 22 January, Eléphant Paname

2019: LIFE – spring-summer 2019, 26 January, Hôtel National des Arts et Métiers

BIRTH – autumn-winter 2019-2020 30 July, École de Médecine Paris Descartes

2020: COSMOS – spring-summer 2020 23 January, Théâtre National de Chaillot

FACE TO FACE – autumn-winter 2020-2021 Alternative project

2021: ATLAS – spring-summer 2021 Digital presentation

EVOKE – autumn-winter 2021-2022 Osanbashi Hall, Yokohama, Japan and digital presentation

2022: LIMINAL – spring-summer 2022 27 January, Oratoire du Louvre

BLUE – autumn-winter 2022-2023 7 july, Palais de Tokyo

2023: INHERIT – spring-summer 2023 25 January, Palais de Tokyo

MAGMA – autumn-winter 2023-2024 5 July, Palais de Tokyo

2024: UTAKATA – spring-summer 2024, 24 January, Palais de Tokyo

UNVEIL – autumn-winter 2024-2025 26 June, Palais de Tokyo

2025: FADE – spring-summer 2025, 29 January, The 55 Haussmann

GLACIER – autumn-winter 2025-2026 9 July, Palais de Tokyo

2026: SILENT– spring-summer 2026, 28 January, The American Cathedral in Paris

== Exhibitions ==
2013: FFI Showroom, Paris

2013: Wonderingmode and Dreams of Reason at Centre of Contemporary Art Znaki Czasu (CoCA) in Torun

2018: HARMONIZE at 21_21 DESIGN SIGHT, Tokyo

Japon Japonismes. Objets inspirés, 1867-2018 at Le musée des Arts décoratifs, Paris

STATE OF FASHION 2018 SEARCHING FOR THE NEW LUXURY, Arnhem

2019: Future and the Arts: AI, Robotics, Cities, Life - How Humanity Will Live Tomorrow at Mori Museum, Tokyo

THE GINZA YUIMA NAKAZATO Exhibition and Store at THE GINZA SPACE, Tokyo

2020: Dress Code:Are You Playing Fashion? At The National Museum of Modern Art, Kyoto, Contemporary Art Museum, Kumamoto and Tokyo Opera City Art Gallery, Tokyo

Making Fashion Sense at HeK - House of Electronic Arts, Basel, Basel

A BIOLOGICAL FUTURE FOR FASHION BY BIOFABRICATION, AS PART OF ‘OUR TIME ON EARTH’ at Barbican Centre, London

2021: Fashion in Japan 1945-2020 at National Art Center Tokyo, Tokyo

2022: Cloud Walkers at Leeum museum, Seoul

2023: FASHION FICTIONS at Vancouver Art Gallery, Vancouver.

2024: YUIMA NAKAZATO BEYOND COUTURE at Cité de la Dentelle et de la Mode, Calais.

2025: YUIMA NAKAZATO Exhibition in Tokyo at Tokyo City View

Dirty Looks Desire and Decay in Fashion at Barbican Centre, London

== Awards ==
- VERTICE AWARD, INTERNATIONAL TALENT SUPPORT #7 FASHION, 2008
- YKK AWARD, INTERNATIONAL TALENT SUPPORT #8 ACCESSORY, 2009
- Mercedes Benz Presents Designer, Japan Fashion Week, 2012
- SHISEIDO AWARD FOR THE BEST NEW DESIGNER OF THE YEAR, MAINICHI FASHION GRAND PRIX, 2017
- WIRED Audi INNOVATION AWARD, 2018

== Publications ==
- 『Matthew Stone: THE BODY BEYOND Yuima Nakazato Presents』（JUNSUKE YAMASAKI, 2011)
- 『YUIMA NAKAZATO Behind the Design』(Bookend, 2022)
- 『YUIMA NAKAZATO BEYOND COUTURE』(LIENART, 2024)
