= Lotta Volkova =

Russian fashion stylist (born 1984)

Lotta Volkova рус. Лотта Волкова
- Born: February 13, 1984 (age 42); Vladivostok, Russian Soviet Federative Socialist Republic Soviet Union
- Occupation: Fashion stylist
- Notable work: Balenciaga (early), Vetements (early), Miu Miu (now)
- Website: https://www.instagram.com/lottavolkova

Lotta Volkova (born 1984) is a Russian fashion stylist and model. She is a fashion stylist for Miu Miu. Previously she was stylist at Vetements and Balenciaga.

== Early life and education ==
Volkova was born in 1984 in Vladivostok, Russia. She was named after the Led Zeppelin song "Whole Lotta Love". Her mother was a professor of physics, and her father was a sea captain. It was her mother who, from childhood, instilled in her the idea that she needed to live by her own rules. Lotta Volkova said about her mother: "She loved post-punk, the early eighties, the era of alternative rock, so I grew up in that atmosphere." It was her mother who instilled in Lotta a love of fashion - she took her twelve-year-old daughter with her on shopping trips to London and Tokyo. As Lotta Volkova admitted: "I had Prada shoes and Dior by Galliano jumpers." Early in her life she lived in an isolated region of Russia, and the internet was an important tool for her to find information. In an interview with Jina Khayyer she stated the following, "I grew up in Vladivostok, Russia, in the former USSR. We had nothing, but we had the Internet. I was obsessed with information. I was obsessed with finding things out. That is still my driving force, to find something new."

When she was 17, she moved to London and enrolled in three art courses. When she was old enough, she enrolled at Central Saint Martins where she studied art and design.

== Career ==
While studying art and photography in London, Volkova became involved in the city's club scene and began making clothes for herself and her friends. Around 2004, she launched a label named Lotta Skeletrix, producing pieces influenced by punk, New Wave and post-punk culture. The label was stocked by boutiques including The Pineal Eye and Dover Street Market. Volkova later discontinued the label and moved to Paris in 2008 to concentrate on styling.

In Paris, Volkova began working with Russian designer Gosha Rubchinskiy.

She later met Demna Gvasalia and joined Vetements from the label's second season and first runway presentation. Contemporary profiles described her role at Vetements as extending beyond runway styling to casting, fittings and creation of individual looks. She also appeared as a model in the label's shows.

After Demna became artistic director of Balenciaga, Volkova worked on his early collections for the house and consulted on its casting and runway presentations. Her collaborations with both Vetements and Balenciaga ended in 2017. During the same period, she worked with labels including Sies Marjan and Mulberry, and styled editorial projects for magazines including Dazed, i-D, Document Journal and 032c.

In 2020, she collaborated with Adidas on a collection of ready-to-wear clothing and accessories.

During Nicola Brognano's tenure as creative director of Blumarine, Volkova styled a number of the label's collections. Her styling of its Fall/Winter 2021 and Spring/Summer 2022 shows accompanied Brognano's revival of Blumarine's early-2000s visual codes. She continued styling the house's runway presentations through at least its Autumn/Winter 2023 collection.

Volkova's first work with Miu Miu was the label's Autumn/Winter 2021 show. She subsequently became a consultant across its collections and styled its runway shows and advertising campaigns. Fashion-industry coverage identified her styling as one factor in Miu Miu's renewed visibility, particularly following the widely publicized cropped sweater and micro-miniskirt look from its Spring/Summer 2022 collection.

In 2022, she launched her first collection with Jean Paul Gaultier.

In 2026, Volkova collaborated with Saint Laurent, styling its Summer 2026 campaign, photographed by Glen Luchford. She also styled the brand's Winter 2026 campaign, photographed by Juergen Teller under the creative direction of Anthony Vaccarello.

== Influence ==
Volkova has been identified by fashion publications as an influential figure in contemporary fashion styling, particularly for her role in developing the visual identities of Vetements, Balenciaga and Miu Miu. Her work is associated with the combination of subcultural references, unconventional casting and the reinterpretation of everyday clothing within luxury fashion.

During her collaborations with Demna Gvasalia at Vetements and Balenciaga, Volkova contributed to the presentation and styling of collections that helped popularize an aesthetic drawing on streetwear, post-Soviet youth culture and deliberately unconventional combinations of garments. Her work extended beyond styling to casting and creative consultation, contributing to the overall visual presentation of the collections.

Her subsequent collaboration with Miuccia Prada at Miu Miu attracted renewed attention to her influence on fashion trends. The brand's styling, including unconventional layering, visible underwear and abbreviated proportions, became widely discussed in fashion media. In 2024, Volkova ranked first in Vogue Runway's Stylist of the Year poll.

In a 2025 profile, The Business of Fashion described Volkova as one of the most influential creative figures working in contemporary fashion, highlighting her ability to adapt her recognizable styling approach to different designers and fashion houses.
