= Sasha Spilberg =

Russian video blogger (born 1997)

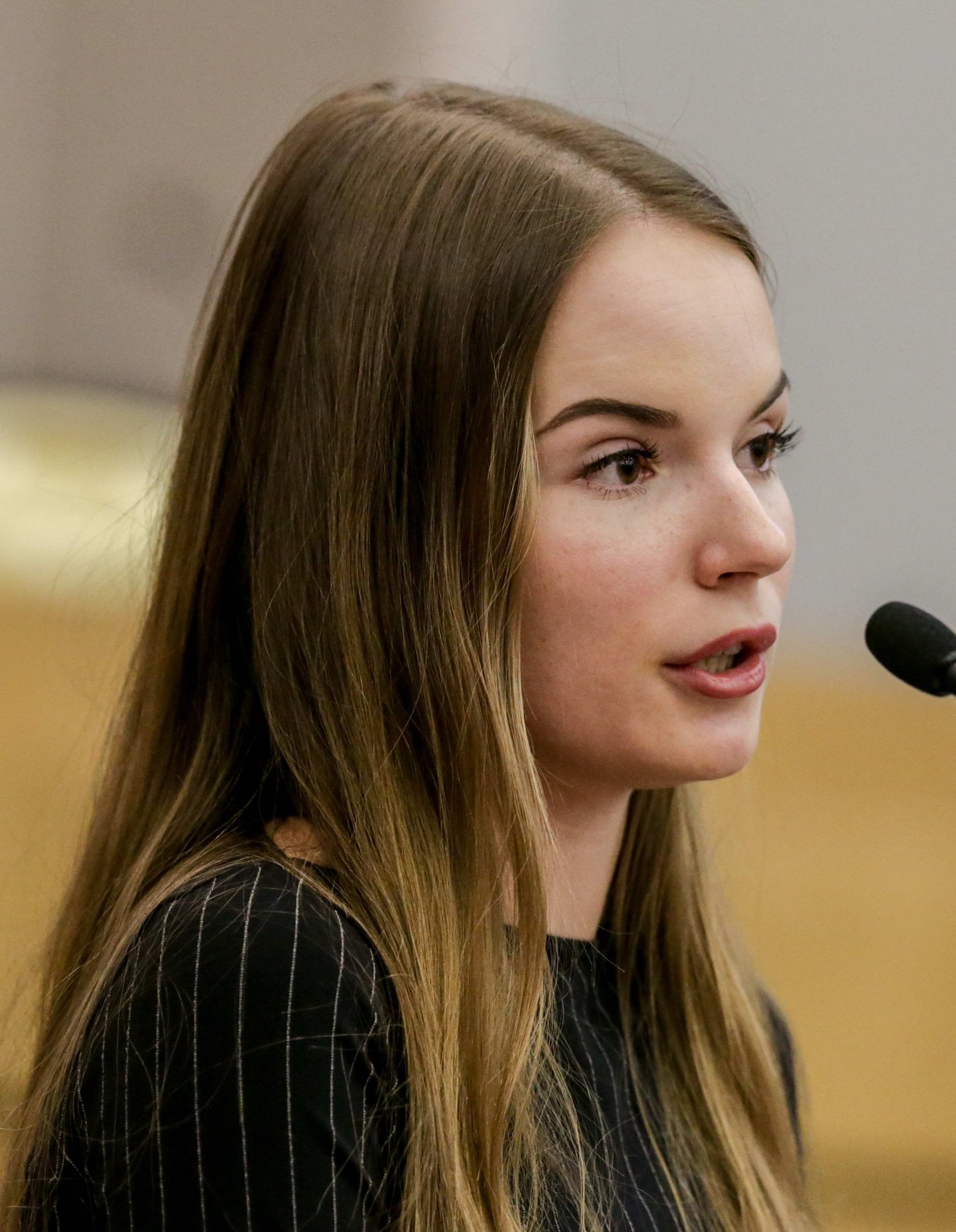
- Born: November 27, 1997 (age 28); Moscow, Russia

YouTube information
- Channel: YouTube channel
- Subscribers: 6.4 million
- Last updated: October 2025

Aleksandra Aleksandrovna Balkovskaya (Russian: Александра Александровна Балковская; born November 27, 1997, Moscow), better known as Sasha Spilberg (Russian: Саша Спилберг), is a Russian video blogger, singer, composer, film actress and model. Spilberg became a teen idol in the 2010s, along with video bloggers such as EeOneGuy and Katya Clap.

In November 2023, Sasha Spilberg had over 6.3 million subscribers on her main YouTube channel.

== Early life ==
Alexandra Balkovskaya was born on November 27, 1997 in Moscow. Her father Alexander Balkovsky is an entrepreneur, co-owner of Z-Tech. Her mother Elena Alexandrovna Balkovskaya is an blogger, stylist, and model. At the age of seven, for health reasons, she moved to Europe with her family, lived in Cyprus, Italy and Switzerland, and returned to Russia at the age of 13. According to Sasha Spilberg, her love of videography and separation from friends pushed her to create her own channel in 2010, she recorded her first videos in English, then, after returning to her homeland, she expanded her audience and continued to run the channel in Russian.

In 2020, Sasha Spilberg was the host of the TV show "Dom-2".

== Creativity ==
Sasha Spilberg is a pseudonym, which Balkovskaya took by agreement with her parents. They gave her complete freedom online with the condition that no one would recognize her real surname. This was told by her father in an interview with Kommersant.

Sasha made her debut on television as a TV presenter in 2015. In the author's show "Spilberg Vlog" on the RU.TV channel, the pilot show aired 24 episodes of the three-minute show, which talked about interesting trends on the Internet. In September 2015, together with Pasha Mikus participated in a campaign for KitKat. In the same year, the girl was on the cover of the November issue of Elle Girl magazine for the first time and gave an interview about life and work as a video blogger.

In 2016, the video blogger was included in the Top 10 most influential girl bloggers on YouTube, at the same time Spilberg made her debut in the film of Bazelevs studio (produced by Timur Bekmambetov) - Vzlomat Blogerov (directed by Maxim Sveshnikov), also starring popular bloggers EeOneGuy, Maryana Ro and others.

In April 2017, Russian Culture Minister Vladimir Medinsky gave an interview on Spilberg's blog; during the conversation, he talked about the ministry's youth-oriented projects - the films Bolshoi and Time of the Firsts, the websites Culture.RF and History.RF.

On May 22, 2017, at the invitation of Sergey Neverov, Deputy Chairman of the State Duma and Secretary of the United Russia General Council, Spilberg took part in a parliamentary hearing on youth policy. The blogger's speech in the State Duma touched on the topic of establishing a dialog between the state and the younger generation; the girl told why video bloggers are so popular and urged parliamentarians to be more open, she also gave a personal assessment of Ruslan Sokolovsky's trial over use of the AR game Pokémon Go in the church. Her speech resonated in society and was widely discussed in the media. The blogger's speech in parliament had no precedents before, either in Russia or abroad.

In the same year, with other video bloggers, Spilberg again appeared on the cover of the January issue of Elle Girl (in total, Sasha appeared four times on the cover). In the fall, Spilberg was invited as a model to the Dolce & Gabbana fall-winter season show.

In May 2019, the number of views on Sasha Spilberg's channel (SaySasha) reached 1 billion. She became the first Russian female blogger with such number of views reached on YouTube.

The year 2020 for Spilberg was marked by several major projects at once: the newspaper Kultura announced the start of filming of the youth series Rummate with Anfisa Chernykh, Mikhail Politsymako and Sasha Spilberg, in the summer of the same year she was invited to TNT, to the show Dom-2, as a new presenter.

== Musical career ==
In her family, both parents have a musical education, so Sasha was involved in music from an early age. At first she wrote songs in English (she has two native languages - Russian and English). Her first song - "Orange City Skies" was written and performed in 2014. In 2015, the first song in Russian "Your Shadow" was released. The composition topped the iTunes and Google Play charts and was in rotation on several Russian radio stations at once (after the success of her song, Spielberg was invited to Russian Radio with an interview). In 2016, she starred in an advertisement for Unilever's Cornetto ice cream, where she sang along with DJ Leonid Rudenko. In the same year, together with other stars, she starred in the music video of the band Gradusy for the song "Gradus 100".

== Personal life ==
In November 2021, she broke up with her boyfriend, Parul Gujral, whom she dated for 3 years.
