= International Talent Support =

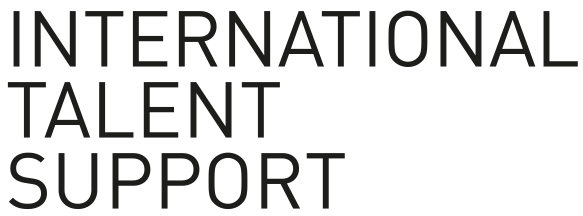

International Talent Support (ITS) is a platform created to give support and visibility to young talents in the field of fashion design, design of accessories and jewelry. The most artistic-oriented designers are also challenged with ITS Artwork, a purely artistic contest.

== Description ==
Contestants are selected from more than 80 countries around the world. After this selection process, they are invited to Trieste to present their works and are evaluated by a special jury that awards the prizes in the competition. ITS is not just a contest, it includes a Creative Archive showcasing projects of the past finalists: a collection of 16,000 portfolios, 220 dresses, 80 jewelry pieces and 120 accessories, and more than 700 digital photo projects. In addition, it produces a yearly trends report "The Seismographer" and has built a wide network made up of designers, journalists, opinion leaders, design teachers, head hunters, heads of studio and more.

The platform was founded and is directed by Barbara Franchin.

Here are some of the past ITS jurors: the performance artist Marina Abramovic, photographers Nick Knight, Ari Marcopoulos and Sarah Moon, the Editor in Chief of Vogue Italy Franca Sozzani, the founder of Business of Fashion Imran Amed, the former head curator of the Costume Institute at the Metropolitan Museum in New York Harold Koda the singer-songwriter Mika and designers such as Raf Simons, Viktor & Rolf, Consuelo Castiglioni, Manish Arora as well as journalists like Hilary Alexander, Angelo Flaccavento and Cathy Horyn.

Many past finalists hold key positions in the fashion industry, like Demna Gvasalia (Creative Director Balenciaga & founder Vetements), Aitor Throup (Executive Creative Director G-Star Raw) and Peter Pilotto (eponymous line).

== Editions ==
=== 2023 ===
The finalists were selected in November 2023. The award ceremony was held in March 2024.

=== 2017 ===
The 2017 edition was suspended for insufficient funding.

=== 2016 ===
2016 marked the fifteenth birthday of ITS, an anniversary edition that welcomed in the jury Demna Gvasalia (founder and artistic director of Vetements and artistic director of Balenciaga), designer Iris Van Herpen and AltaRoma President Silvia Venturini Fendi, while the theme of the event was “Utopia. The winners were:

- Mayako Kano, ITS Fashion Award in partnership with OTB
- Niels Gundtoft Hansen & Anna Bornhold, OTB Award
- Helen Kirkum, ITS Accessories Award in partnership with YKK
- Young Jin Jang, YKK Award
- Marco Baitella, ITS Artwork Award in partnership with Swatch
- Jana Zornik, Swatch Award
- Hazuki Katagai, Swatch Art Peace Hotel Award
- Sari Rathel, ITS Jewelry Award in partnership with Swarovski
- Tatiana Lobanova, Swarovski Award
- Justin Smith, Generali Future Award
- Anna Bornhold, Modateca Deanna Award
- Helen Kirkum, Vogue Talents Award

=== 2015 ===
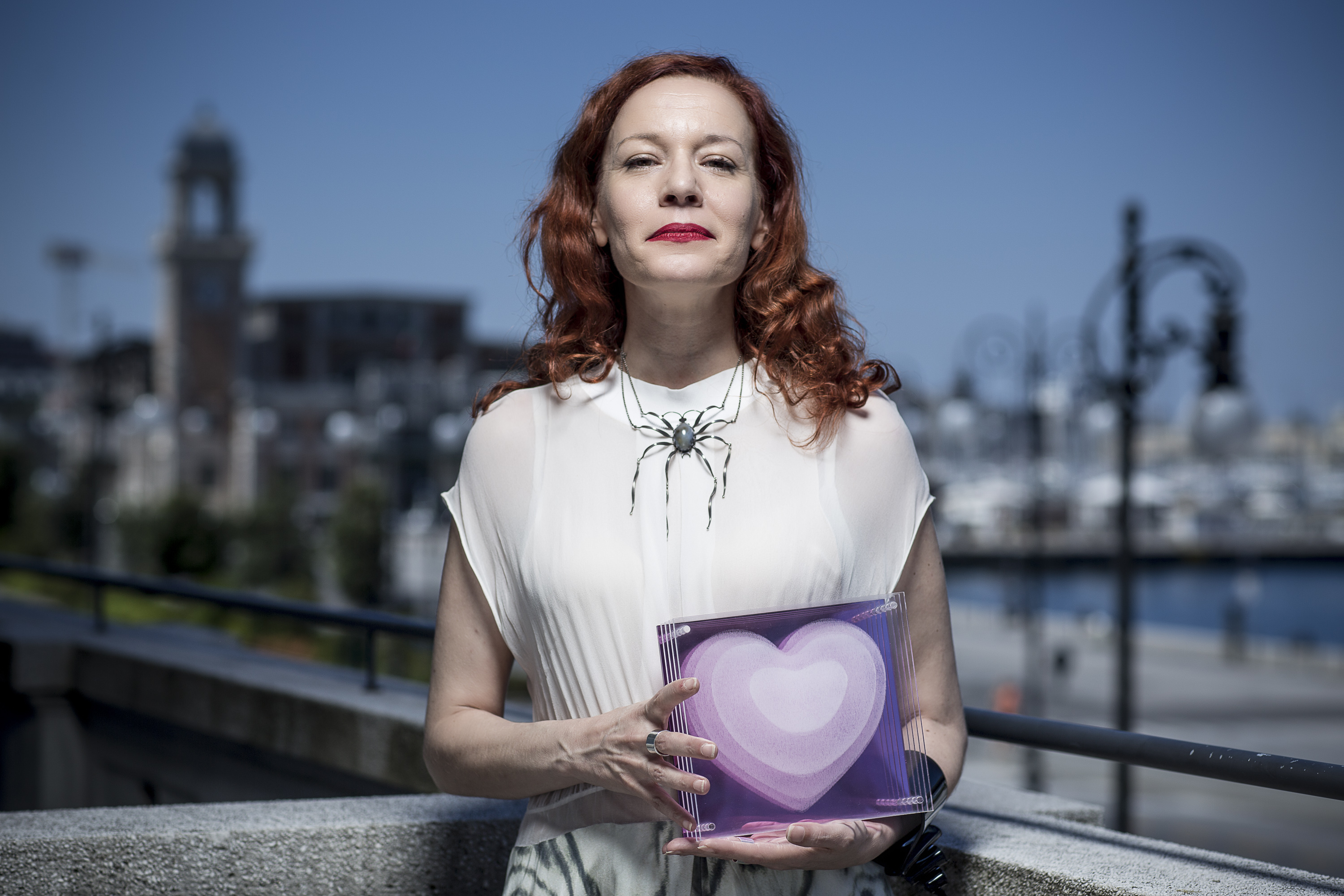
Barbara Franchin holding the heart trophy at ITS 2015

The jury for this edition featured, among others, Massimo Giorgetti (Founder and Creative Director of MSGM), Carlo Capasa (President of the National Chamber of Italian Fashion) and Oriole Cullen (Acting Senior Curator of Contemporary Fashion, Victoria & Albert Museum). Aitor Throup, a finalist in 2006, received a lifetime achievement award. The concept for this edition was "THE FUTURE". The winners were:

- Paula Knorr, ITS Fashion Award in partnership with OTB
- Yuko Koike, OTB Award and Modateca Deanna Award
- Jenifer Thévenaz-Burdet, Eyes on Talents Award
- Elina Määttänen, Vogue Talents Award
- Isabel Helf, ITS Accessories Award in partnership with YKK
- Bianca Chong, YKK Fastening Award
- Hiroki Kataoka, ITS Artwork Award in partnership with Swatch
- Shay Tako, Swatch Award
- Alexis Gautier, Swatch Art Peace Hotel Award
- In Wai Kwok, ITS Jewelry Award in partnership with Swarovski
- Kota Okuda, ITS Jewelry Award in partnership with Swarovski
- Yun Sun Jang, Swarovski Award
- Yang Wang, Samsung Galaxy Award
- Aitor Throup, Generali Special Award

=== 2014 ===
Consuelo Castiglioni (MARNI), Nick Knight, Nicholas Kirkwood and pop star Mika (in the jury for the new ITS ARTWORK contest) were among the jurors. On July 12, the day of the final evening, the event reached the 9th position as a global trending topic on social networks. CNN [4] and France 2 covered the event. The concept for this edition was "Lucid Dreams". The winners were:

- Katherine Roberts-Wood, Fashion Collection of the Year and Vogue Talents Award for fashion
- Zoe Waters, Diesel Award
- Anita Hirlekar, Fashion Special Prize
- Natalija Mencej, Camera Nazionale della Moda Italiana Award
- Yasuto Kimura, Showstudio Prize
- Anna Bornhold, Modateca Award
- Mirja Pitkaart, Accessories Collection of the Year
- Takafumi Arai, YKK Special Award
- Ivana Damjanovic, YKK Award and Eyes on Talents Award
- Maiko Takeda, Vogue Talents Award for accessories
- Virginia Burlina, Swatch Award
- Noriko Nakazato, Swarovski Jewelry Award
- Lior Shulak, Swarovski Jewelry Award
- Leonie Barth, Samsung GALAXY Award

=== 2013 ===
ITS becomes even more present on social with the launch of a live feed that collects any ITS related content. Nicola Formichetti, Carla Sozzani and Yasuhiro Mihara were among the jurors. This edition was characterized by the concept "The Physics of Creativity". The winners were:* Han Chul Lee, Fashion Collection of the Year and Vogue Talents Award

- Xiao Li, Diesel Award
- Tomohiro Sato, Fashion Special Prize and Modateca Award
- Nelly Hoffmann, Yoox.com Award
- Felix Chabluk Smith, Business of Fashion Award
- Leonard Kahlcke, Accessories Collection of the Year
- Percy Lau, YKK Award
- Cat Potter, Eyes on Talents Award
- Youngwon Kim, Vogue Talents Award for Accessories
- Lili Colley, Swarovski Elements Jewelry Award
- Milko Boyarov, Swatch Award

=== 2012 ===
In 2012, the performance artist Marina Abramovic was in the fashion competition jury with Renzo Rosso and the fashion blogger Susie Bubble. The jury also featured two past finalists, Aitor Throup and Mark Fast, both of whom have since become famous for their respective fashion lines. This edition's concept played with two extremes, "Good or Evil". The winners were:* Ichiro Suzuki, Fashion Collection of the Year

- Marius Janusauskas, Diesel Award and D la Repubblica Award
- Luke Brooks, Fashion Special Prize
- Mark Goldenberg, Avery Dennison Brand Innovation Award and Vogue Talents Award for fashion
- Isabel Vollrath, Saturday Night Fever Award
- Shengwei Wang, Modateca Award
- Ana Rajcevic, Accessories Collection of the Year
- Benjamin John Hall, YKK Award
- Victoria Spruce, Vogue Talents Award for accessories
- Xiao Zi Yang, Swarovski Elements Jewelry Award

=== 2011 ===
The 2011 edition marked the contest's 10th anniversary, with a jury that included Hilary Alexander, the Academy Award for Photography Dante Spinotti and featured the return of Viktor & Rolf. It was the year of the launch of ITS JEWELRY, the competition devoted entirely to jewelry. Shaun Samson, the winner of the Fashion Collection of the Year, participated in the London Fashion Week with his fashion line a short while later. The winners were:

- Shaun Samson, Fashion Collection of the Year
- Niran Avisar, Diesel Award
- Kristian Guerra, Fashion Special Prize and D la Repubblica Award
- Fah Chakshuvej, Maison Martin Margiela Award
- Ruth Green, Skunkfunk Sustainability Award
- Kevin Kramp, Modateca Award
- Oliver Ruuger, Accessories Collection of the Year
- Laura Amstein, YKK Award
- Anna Schwamborn, Modamont Award
- Sarah Vedel Hurtigkarl and Raluca Grada, Swarovski Elements Jewelry Award
- Nika Kupyrova, Disaronno Photo Award
- Gerardo Vizmanos, SVA PhotoGlobal Award

=== 2010 ===
The designers Viktor & Rolf participated as first-time jurors and Nina Nitsche (Maison Martin Margiela) was also part of the jury. Shortly after the event, the winner of Accessories Collection of the Year Sarah Williams established a partnership with another Accessories finalist, Kirsty Ward, launching an exclusive line of custom made accessories. The winners were:

- Takashi Nishiyama, Fashion Collection of the Year
- Michael Kampe, Diesel Award
- Yong Kyun Shin, Fashion Special Prize
- Niels Peeraer, RA Award
- Sarah Williams, Accessories Collection of the Year and Absolut Award
- Emma Yeo, YKK Award
- Yuwen Lu, Modamont Award

=== 2009 ===
Yuima Nakazato became the second finalist in the history of ITS to be selected for two different competitions in two different editions. The edition concept transformed ITS in the "Greatest Show of All", drawing inspiration from the touring circus shows of the early 20th century. The winners were:

- Mason Jung, Fashion Collection of the Year
- Yuima Nakazato, YKK Award
- Ali Forbes, Crystallized Accessories Award
- Chau Har Lee, Accessories Collection of the Year
- Elise Gettliffe, I-D Styling Award
- Alice Knackfuss, Diesel Award
- Masha Lamzina, Fashion Special Prize
- Michael Van Der Ham, Vertice Award
- Saana Wang, Mini Clubman Photo Award
- Silvia Noferi, Pitti Immagine Photo Award
- Monica Lozano Red, Air Dolomiti Photo Award
- Noemie Goudal, Pitti Immagine Photo Award
- Clare Bottomley, ITS Photoweb and SVA Photoglobal Award

=== 2008 ===
Mark Fast's knitwear attracted everyone's attention, and was the prelude to a brand that received a lot of attention as a result of ITS. The finalists of the photography competition Mashid Mohadjerin won the World Press Photo award for a project that started immediately after ITS. Designer Gareth Pugh and photographer Sarah Moon were among the jurors. The winners were:

- Valentim Manuel Estevão Quaresma, Accessories Collection of the Year
- Benjamin Shun Lai Ng, YKK Award
- Tomasz Donocik, YKK Special Prize
- Elise Gettliffe, Fashion Special Prize
- Yuima Nakazato, Vertice Award
- Alithia Spuri-Zampetti, Maria Luisa Award
- Mark Fast, I-D Styling Award
- Heikki Salonen, Diesel Award
- David Steinhorst, Fashion Collection of the Year
- Mashid Mohadjerin, ITS Photoweb
- Debora Vrizzi, Pitti Immagine Photo Award
- Kazutaka Nagashima, Mini Clubman Photo Award
- Matthieu Lavanchy, SVA Photoglobal Award
- Venetia Dearden, Air Dolomiti Photo Award
- Martine Fougeron, Pitti Immagine Photo Award

=== 2007 ===
The generation of young talents selected in 2007 featured many finalists that, following ITS, made a name for themselves thanks to their respective brands: Justin Smith, David Longshaw, Taro Horiuchi, Mareunrol, Ek Thongprasert, Heaven Tanudiredja (who was a finalist in both Fashion Accessories, anticipating the launch of her own line of jewelry). The winners were:

- Liron Braker, YKK Accessory Award
- Anna Sheldon, YKK Special Award
- Justin Smith, i-D Styling Award and Maria Luisa Award
- Susanne Happle, Accessories Collection of the Year
- Ek Thongprasert, Fashion Collection of the Year and Develon Award
- Migle Kacerauskiene, Fashion Special Prize
- Heaven Tanudiredja, Vertice Award
- Taro Horiuchi, Diesel Award
- Maria Giulia Giorgiani, Pitti Immagine Photo Award and Finalist Involved In The Mini Clubman Tour
- May Heek, SVA Photoglobal Award
- Jing Quek, MINI International Photo Award and Pitti Immagine Photo Award

=== 2006 ===
In 2006 the ITS ACCESSORIES contest was inaugurated. Aitor Throup was the revelation of the year with a menswear collection that redesigned the production processes. Franca Sozzani, Raf Simons and Cathy Horyn were on the jury. The winners were:

- Heather Blake, Accessories Collection of the Year
- Maria Hjelm, YKK Accessory Award
- Mikio Sakabe, Special Jury Prize
- Matthieu Blazy, Maria Luisa Award
- Tamar Daniel (Schreiber), WGSN Best Portfolio
- Aitor Throup, Fashion Collection of the Year and I-D Styling Award and ITS 2015 Generali Special Award
- Daniel Ivarsson, Diesel Award
- Catherine Sundqvist, VMAN / V Magazine Award
- Remigiusz Pyrdol, MINI International Photo Award and Le Book Award and Stage Fabbrica

=== 2005 ===
Antonio Marras, Boudicca and Antonio Berardi were on the jury. The ITS PHOTO contest was launched and its jury featured the founder of Visionaire Cecilia Dean. Christopher de Vos, who later worked for Vivienne Westwood before joining forces with Peter Pilotto's homonymous brand, was one of the finalists. The winners were:* Christoph Froehlich, Diesel Award

- Eli Effenberger, Maria Luisa Award and Special Jury Prize
- Marga Weimans, I-D Styling Award
- Mie Albaek Nielsen and Caroline Hansen, Ingeo Sustainability Award
- Ryo Yamada, WGSN Best Portfolio Award
- Marcus Lereng Wilmont, Collection of the Year
- Danielle Mourning, MINI International Photo Award

=== 2004 ===
Yoshikazu Yamagata was among the winners of 2004. He would later set up a school in Tokyo that would produce numerous ITS finalists. Peter Pilotto was among the finalists. In the following years he created the Peter Pilotto brand together with a 2005 finalist, Christopher de Vos. Raf Simons was in the jury together with Richard Buckley, Hilary Alexander and Ennio Capasa. The winners were:

- Iris Eibelwimmer, Maria Luisa Award
- Demna Gvasalia, Collection of the Year
- Peter Pilotto, Maria Luisa Award
- Takashi Sugioka, 3rd Jury Prize
- Steven Hoffman, 2nd Jury Prize
- Yoshikazu Yamagata, Special Prize, Ingeo Sustainability Award and WGSN Best Portfolio
- Lesley Mobo, Diesel Award

=== 2003 ===
The winner Cathy Pill had the honour of being invited to present her collection during the Parisian fashion week, where she continued to present her brand for nearly a decade. Dombrovicz Laurent, Xavier Delcour and Jenny Meirens were some of the jurors. Fabrizio Talia, winner of the Best Womenswear Collection Award, later joined forces with Justin Smith – the two met in 2007 – for the launch of the project (Es) * Artisanal, chosen as a finalist in 2010. The winners were:

- Slobodan Mihajlović, Maria Luisa Award
- Cathy Pill, Collection of the Year
- Anne Ventzel, Best Menswear Collection
- Fabrizio Talia, Best Womenswear Collection
- Akihiro Kiuchi, Jury Prize
- Teppei Sugaya, Diesel Award

=== 2002 ===
The jury of the first edition of the International Talent Support featured, among others, Isabella Blow, Editor in Chief of Nylon Magazine Marvin Jarrett, Director of i-D magazine Terry Jones and the Creative Director of Black Book Magazine Evan L.Schindler. The winners were:

- Anais Buscail and Vanessa Raveau, PlayStation
- Assaf Bitton, INTESABCI Award
- Bernadett Penkov, Dupont Total Look
- Céline Gautron, Dupont Shirt/Trousers Category
- Chu Po Ho, Dupont Knitwear Top Category
- Daniele Controversio, Collection of the Year and Dupont Trousers category
- Einav Zucker, Diesel Award
- Elisa Grazioli, PlayStation
- Erik Jan Frenken, Best Womenswear Collection
- Rianne Caminada, PlayStation
- Roel Ruyten, PlayStation
- Vishvajeet Dhir, Best Menswear Collection
- Goldy Serussi, Dupont Shirt/Trousers Category
