= Almost Naked party =

Public scandal in Russia in 2023

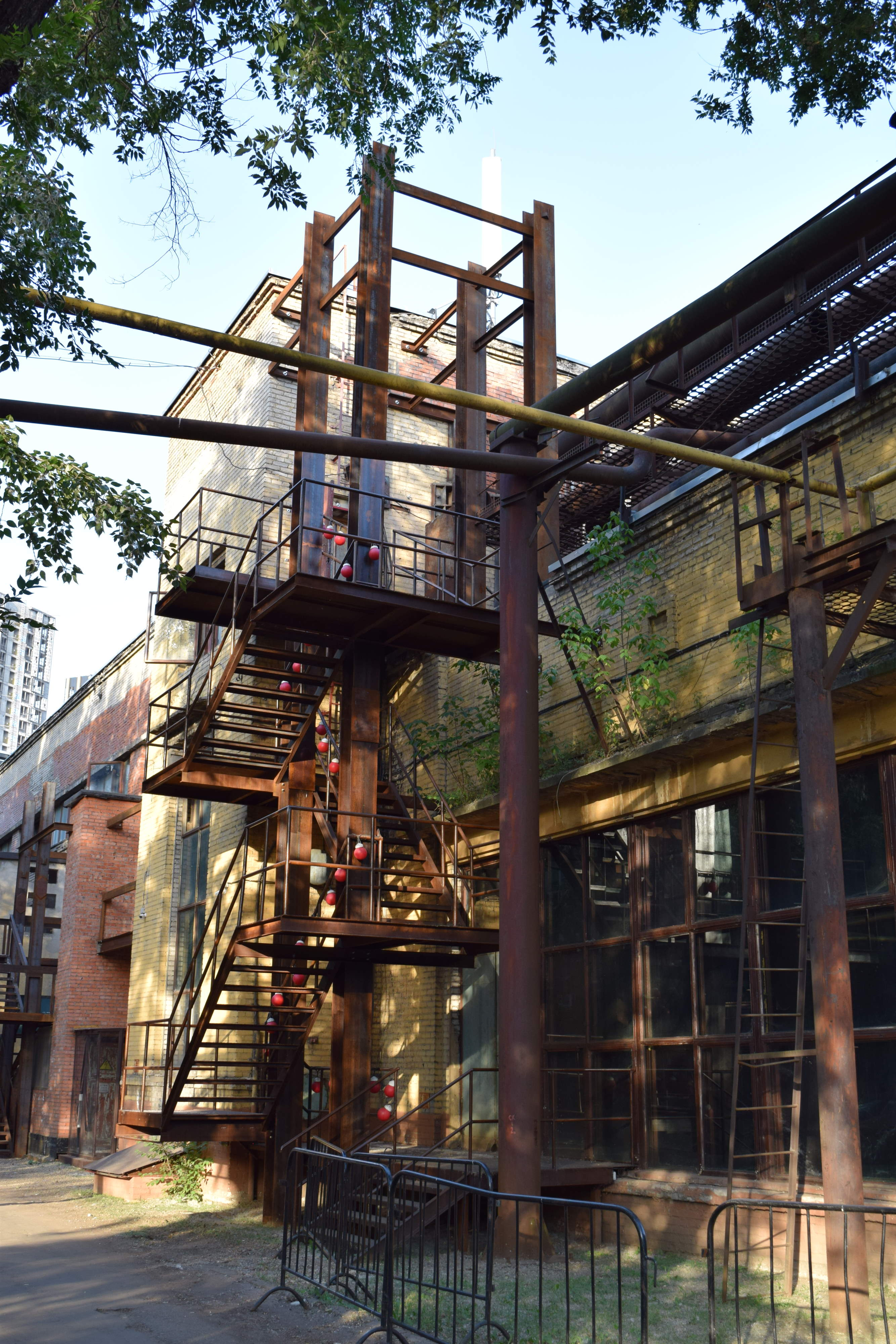
- The building of the Mutabor club, located on the territory of GPZ-1, where the party took place
- Date: December 20–21, 2023
- Venue: Mutabor club
- Location: Building 32, 13 Sharikopodshipnikovskaya street, Moscow, Russia
- Participants: Nastya Ivleeva; Philipp Kirkorov; Ksenia Sobchak; Dima Bilan; GeeGun; Alyona Vodonayeva; Sasha Sulim; Vacío; Glukoza; Lolita Milyavskaya; Olga Orlova; Anna Asti; Sasha Spilberg

The Almost Naked party was a party held by Russian blogger and TV presenter Nastya Ivleeva in Moscow on 20–21 December 2023, attended by many Russian celebrities. The event sparked a public scandal after photos were published on the Russian Internet. It was sharply criticized by pro-government propagandists and bloggers as being inappropriate while Russian soldiers are dying in the ongoing Russian invasion of Ukraine. Those present at the party faced public censure. Deputies, patriotic organizations, and war correspondents demanded that the party be investigated for LGBT propaganda, drugs, and extremism, and also called for a boycott of the people present at the event.

The Russian government considered the party a challenge to the state-promoted traditional values of Russian society. Despite public apologies, musicians who attended were subsequently removed from New Year broadcasts, fined, and sentenced to arrest. The Lefortovo Court of Moscow recognized the party as "propaganda of non-traditional sexual relations." This is stated in the decision in the case of rapper Vacío, who was arrested for 15 days for participating in the event. The party participants issued a public apology. Ivleeva, as the organizer of the party, was fined 100,000 rubles.

The condemnation of the event was supported by Russian President Vladimir Putin. It was notable as those who attended were mostly supportive of the Putin government and had previously avoided criticism.

== Background ==
According to publications by The Independent, The Guardian and The Washington Post, the party took place during the Russian leadership's efforts in recent years to strengthen conservative social policies in Russia. Russian President Vladimir Putin has actively supported social conservatism, calling for families to have more children and introducing strict sanctions against the LGBT movement. The scandal became one of the indicators of changes in Russian society, which reflect the strengthening of the conservative trend, the condemnation of liberal values, and growing nationalism in the context of the invasion of Ukraine. On 30 November 2023, the Supreme Court of Russia declared the LGBT movement extremist, which complements the general context of strengthening conservative politics in Russia.

== Event ==
The event was a Christmas dress-up ball held at Moscow's Mutabor nightclub on 20–21 December 2023. The first night, 20 December, was exclusive for celebrities and invitation only, with tickets costing US$11,000. More than 200 people attended the party. Photos and videos from the party went viral on social media. Both the concept of the event and the costumes of the guests were criticized.

Among the guests of the party were Ksenia Sobchak, Philipp Kirkorov, Dima Bilan, GeeGun, Alyona Vodonayeva, Lolita Milyavskaya, Anna Asti, and Sasha Spilberg. Celebrities who were invited but did not attend included Timati, Feduk, Big Baby Tape, Nico Cartosio, Tina Kandelaki, Svetlana Bondarchuk, Zivert, Moneyken, Nyusha, Yana Rudkovskaya, Nastasya Samburskaya, Kristina Si, Filipp Yankovsky, and Fyodor Smolov. In total, about 450 people were invited to the party.

Vacío wore only training shoes and a sock on his penis. Ivleeva claimed she wore a 23 million rouble (about US$257,600) diamond and emerald necklace around her waist (the jewels positioned on her backside) .

The second night (21 December) was open to the general public for 2,500 rubles (about US$28). Partying continued into 22 December.

According to Ksenia Sobchak, Nikita Mikhalkov informed Vladimir Putin about the party.

== Condemnation of the event ==
We need to pay attention to the guys who are returning from the zone of a special military operation. When people decide to do this, when they go through this crucible and return, many life priorities are lined up differently. Here you will no longer jump without pants at any events, here people look at life completely differently, the priorities and values are different.

— Vladimir Putin, 16 January 2024

According to Radio Free Europe/Radio Liberty, many "turbo-patriotic" bloggers were outraged by the event being held while Russian soldiers are dying in Ukraine. Those present at the party were accused of treason. On 21 December 2023, some Russian pro-war Telegram channels, some members Russian military participating in the invasion of Ukraine, and the social movements Sorok Sorokov and Call of the People contacted the prosecutor's office with a demand to investigate the Moscow club Mutabor for LGBT propaganda because of Ivleeva's party.

The party was condemned by United Russia deputy Maria Butina, propagandist Vladimir Solovyov, head of the Safe Internet League Ekaterina Mizulina, A Just Russia deputy Dmitry Gusev, and deputy chairman of the Synodal Department for Church-Society and Media Relations Vakhtang Kipshidze. Vladimir Putin was reported to have been disappointed with the event, to have demanded punishments and to have approved of the condemnations. The issue became a public scandal and dominated news reporting in Russia for several days.

Critics said the event was insulting to Russian soldiers fighting in Ukraine and that the event promoted LGBTQ+ values, illegal under Russian law. Soldiers in Ukraine were reported to have complained about the event.

=== Response to criticism ===
Ivleeva, Kirkorov, Milyavskaya, Sobchak, and others apologised on social media.

Ivleeva had initially responded to the criticism with mockery, but later released a two-part apology video.

Kirkorov said he was only briefly in attendance. Bilan stressed that he was conservatively dressed and not responsible for how others dressed. Milyavskaya described the event as an "art project".

== Consequences ==
On 22 December 2023, as part of an ongoing investigation, police seized recordings from surveillance cameras at the Mutabor club.

Party attendants who were condemned, including Ksenia Sobchak, began to make public apologies, posting apology videos on their blogs and other Internet resources. The practice of public apologies have become prevalent in Russia in 2015, when critics of Chechen leader Ramzan Kadyrov were often forced to apologize to him on camera, and has become increasingly common since the invasion of Ukraine in 2022.

The concerts of some attending artists and their participation in the Little Blue Light were canceled, except for Kirkorov and Lolita, who were instead edited out of the program. Kirkorov's image was removed from the poster of the New Year's comedy Ivan Vasilyevich Changes Everything! The singer has also been boycotted on television.

According to Meduza, Kirkorov, Milyavskaya, Glyukoza, Bilan, and Anna Asti were included in the list of 50 banned musicians compiled by the Russian authorities along with artists who did not support the war.

During Vladimir Putin's address to the Federal Assembly, Ivleeva and Sobchak spoke out in support of the program voiced there. Ivleeva announced plans to vote for "initiatives and projects that have been announced." During the 2024 Russian presidential election, attendees publicly announced their votes.

=== Ivleeva ===
Faced with mass criticism, on 24 December, Ivleeva released a public apology for the event and promised to donate all the proceeds to charity.

Ivleeva was fined 100,000 roubles. The telecommunications company MTS and Tinkoff Bank broke their contracts with Ivleeva, and a class action lawsuit was filed against her for 1 billion rubles (with the money to go to veterans of the invasion of Ukraine). Information appeared in the press that an unscheduled tax audit by the Federal Taxation Service found an underpayment of 137 million rubles. Ivleeva may face criminal prosecution for tax evasion on a particularly large scale.

On 2 May 2024, Ivleeva reported that she visited the Russian-occupied territories of Ukraine, including the destroyed Mariupol, which is "actively being restored" and "listened to the war" on the contact line. Ivleeva also changed her attitude towards the Russian invasion of Ukraine, Alexei Navalny, and Vladimir Putin. She stated that when she previously posted an anti-war post, she "had no analysis, no understanding, no knowledge of any historical data," that she never supported Alexei Navalny and "was subject to the fashionable trend," and that she always viewed Vladimir Putin "with sympathy." Ivleeva also stated that she provides support to the Russian military, showing a video where a Russian military man thanks her for her help in purchasing a bus and an unmanned aerial vehicle.

=== Vacío ===
Rapper Vacío (real name Nikolai Vasiliev), who came to the event with a sock on his genitals, received a sentence of 15 days in prison and a fine of 200,000 rubles and he also apologized on camera. He was found guilty of petty hooliganism and for propaganda of non-traditional sexual relations, which was for a video recording of male party participants licking the sock Vacio was wearing.

A video was also posted online of the sock being quickly taken off Vacio's penis by another attendee at the party, and Vacio commented that while "...he regretted his first act, ...the second arrest was completely incomprehensible to him." as the sock was taken off by other people at the party who also posted a video of it online.

Vasilyev commented the idea for the sock came from a friend of his who suggested it to him and that he did not imagine that there would be such a huge and resonant response from the public.

At the end of his 15 day prison sentence, his detention was extended for another 10 days again due to petty hooliganism and he was also taken to the military conscription office and given a military summons for 9 January. At first it was not clear why Vacio was summoned to the military recruitment center as he was legally unfit to serve in the armed forces due to an unspecified medical condition and it was also commented that "...Vasilyev, 'doesn’t face the threat of serving in the army because he had allegedly failed the military-medical commission in his native Yekaterinburg for health reasons.'"

On 14 May 2024, Vasilyev's representative announced that the rapper had left Russia for the United States. This came after he failed to appear at the military enlistment office the previous day. Singer Yana Djalu, a friend of Vasilyev, confirmed his departure, stating that Vasilyev felt "pressured" and "not free" in Russia. Vasilyev then later confirmed that he had travelled to Yerevan in Armenia and not the United States and that he had been telling his friends that he had moved to the United States as he was concerned of there being any possibility that he could be extradited from Armenia and he wanted to keep a low profile. Reports also suggested Vasilyev considered renouncing his Russian citizenship, although no official confirmation has been made regarding his emigration or citizenship status.

On 7 January, the St. Petersburg club MOD hosted a concert by the rock group Schenki, during which the group's lead singer Maxim Tesli (real name Maxim Moiseev) went on stage wearing a sock on his penis during the performance. The sock fell to the floor and the singer appeared completely naked in front of the audience for a short moment, but then went backstage and got dressed. A video of the incident ended up on the Internet and outraged Ekaterina Mizulina, who considered the singer's actions to be an imitation of Vacío. On the night of 9 January, the singer was arrested at Pulkovo Airport - he intended to fly to Yekaterinburg, and from there to Kazakhstan.

As noted in the media, Maxim Tesli appeared in public in a similar form back in 2016, and a number of foreign performers even earlier. It was unclear whether Tesli’s concert appearance was intended as a gesture of support for Vacio.

=== Kirkorov ===
A petition demanding that Kirkorov be deprived of the title of People's Artist of Russia has received tens of thousands of signatures on the Internet. On 29 December 2023, the Ministry of Culture of the Russian Federation stated that it would not deprive Kirkorov of his title. In his defense, Kirkorov said that he "dropped by for five minutes at the event" and simply "entered the wrong door" (this phrase quickly became an Internet meme). Shortly before the New Year, information appeared that scenes with Kirkorov would be cut out "minute by minute" from the New Year's TV show Little Blue Light on the Russia-1 channel, from a TNT channel film Ivan Vasilievich Changes Everything based on Leonid Gaidai's comedy film Ivan Vasilievich Changes His Profession, and also that in the New Year's broadcast of The Masked Singer on NTV, his participation would be minimized due to the impossibility of cutting it out completely. On 8 January, on his Telegram channel Primadonna, Kirkorov announced that he would donate his fee for participating in The Masked Singer to residents of Belgorod who suffered as a result of the bombing.

Since all party participants were threatened with unscheduled tax audits, at the end of the year, Kirkorov tried to pay off all his tax debts in the amount of 12.3 million rubles. At the beginning of January 2024, the Russian Authors' Society filed a lawsuit against Kirkorov, demanding to recover 2 million rubles from him "for the use of artistic works belonging to the organization."

The premiere of the fifth season of The Masked Singer, in which Kirkorov is the chairman of the jury, was originally supposed to take place on 11 February 2024, but for unknown reasons was postponed to a week later, on 18 February. According to media reports, the postponement of the premiere of the fifth season of the show was associated with Kirkorov's participation in the party. On 9 February, it was revealed that Kirkorov would remain the chairman of the jury in The Masked Singer. Music critic and TV presenter Sergey Sosedov denied the rumors about the postponement of the premiere of the fifth season, calling them "nonsense." In Sosedov's opinion, Kirkorov can always be replaced, clarifying that the exact reason for postponing the premiere of the fifth season of the show has not been stated.

On 13 February 2024, Kirkorov visited the Donetsk People's Republic, where he spoke to wounded Russian soldiers; previously, Russian authorities demanded that artists who opposed the war in Ukraine "repent" and go to Donbass so that they would be allowed to continue performing in Russia.

=== Mutabor club ===
On 29 December, it was revealed that against Art Center LLC, which managed the club, at the request of the Federal Service for the Oversight of Consumer Protection and Welfare, a case was opened for an administrative offense under Article 6.6 of the Code of Administrative Offenses of the Russian Federation (violation of sanitary and epidemiological requirements for organizing catering for the population in specially equipped places). The trial was scheduled for 9 January - by this time, the club had been closed and sealed for a week and planned events were postponed.

On 10 January, the court suspended the work of the Mutabor club for 90 days due to "violation of sanitary standards" (the maximum period under Article 6.6 of the Code of Administrative Offenses of the Russian Federation - violation of sanitary and epidemiological requirements for catering), calculating the closure period from 27 December. It is alleged that the reason for the closure was the presence in the club of a patient with an infectious disease (his identity was established by a cash receipt for beer purchased with a bank card). The protocol was considered behind closed doors at the request of the club, since the case contained personal data and the diagnosis of the patient.

== Reaction to scandal ==
BBC News suggested that the criticism reflected a need for the Russian ruling class to generate scapegoats in the face of poor progress towards Russia's war aims in Ukraine. Opposition activist Maxim Katz was quoted: "For the first time in a long time, the system has pushed back against those who supported all its rules, as long as they weren't applied to them." Pjotr Sauer writing in The Guardian described it as "one of the starkest examples to date of how Vladimir Putin is moving the country in a conservative and anti-liberal direction." According to Novaya Gazeta, "cancel culture" is used instrumentally in Russia and comes not from society, but from the state, which makes it possible to enrich the repressive arsenal while maintaining a "decent appearance."

According to The Moscow Times, the persecution of the celebrities was organized on a command from the Russian government. The persecution is associated with the desire to redirect public negativity towards celebrities in order to shift public attention from other significant events and problems, such as the rejection of journalist Yekaterina Duntsova's participation in the presidential elections. Political analysts speculate that the Russian government used the scandal surrounding the party to divert public attention from important domestic and foreign issues, such as the invasion of Ukraine, the sinking of the landing ship Novocherkassk at Feodosia, rising food prices, and economic problems.

The owner of the Russian Media Group, Vladimir Kiselev, published a statement in Nezavisimaya Gazeta, in which he discusses those who were undeservedly punished and who managed to avoid punishment for participating in and organizing the event (VP of MTS Igor Mishin, director of music and event projects at VK Konstantin Sidorkov, and head of marketing at Yandex-Ultima Dmitry Vikulin).

Film director Karen Shakhnazarov evaluated the party, taking into account changes in Russia that have affected politics, economics, and culture: "Such events took place for decades almost every Friday, and no one paid attention to it. But look at the sharp rejection that has suddenly arisen now. That is, morality is also changing." In his opinion, after the invasion of Ukraine, order must be maintained in Russia and internal discord must not be allowed.

== See also ==
- Naked party
