= Face (rapper) =

Russian rapper (born 1997)

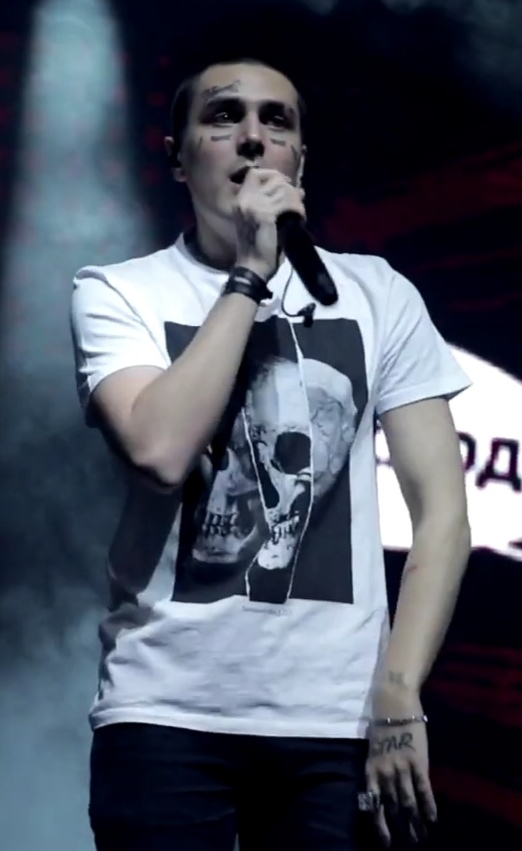
- Face in 2018

Background information
- Also known as: Face; ФЕЙС; Batei Aurora; Lil Thot
- Born: Ivan Timofeyevich Dryomin; 8 April 1997 (age 29); Ufa, Russia
- Genres: Cloud rap; trap; mumble rap; Russian hip hop
- Occupations: Rapper; singer; producer
- Years active: 2015–present

Ivan Timofeyevich Dryomin (Russian: Иван Тимофеевич Дрёмин; born 8 April 1997), better known by his stage name Face, is a Russian rapper who made his debut in 2015 with his EP Cursed Stamp (Russian: Проклятая печать) and has been producing music since.

== Early life ==
Ivan Dryomin was born on 8 April 1997 in Ufa. His father, Timofei Dryomin (born c. 1968), was a struggling businessman. Dryomin has an older brother, Bogdan (born c. 1992). Their parents divorced when the younger son was less than a year old. Both children were baptized in the Russian Orthodox Church. Their mother was devoutly religious, and was diagnosed with schizophrenia when Dryomin was in the eighth grade. As a youth, Dryomin participated in boxing at school and won medals in city competitions.

In 2013, Dryomin and his friends swore a blood brother oath to the allegiance of Adolf Hitler to lead racial holy war. However, Dryomin quickly realized the wrongfulness in such white nationalist views and has since disavowed such beliefs. He was a member of the gopnik subculture and joined "Aurora Gang", a youth street gang, and was nicknamed Batei Aurora, after the street he grew up on. This gang engaged in petty crime including underage drinking, vandalizing cars, shoplifting, and street fights. In 2014, Dryomin supported himself by growing and dealing marijuana and hashish from his rented apartment. He was caught by police and sent to live with his grandmother. It was then that he turned away from his life of hooliganism due to fear of being killed or incarcerated, and started to create music.

== Career ==
In 2015, Dryomin attended a concert by Russian rapper Pharaoh and was inspired to make his own rap songs. His stage name Face was invented with his brother and is meant to characterize his many-sidedness and constant metamorphosis in his work. He released his debut EP Проклятая печать ("Cursed Seal") on SoundCloud on 30 October 2015. A video was released for one of its tracks, "Гоша Рубчинский" ("Gosha Rubchinskiy"), a homage to the fashion designer of the same name, on 3 January 2016.

Face released three EPs in 2016: Vlone, Mayhem, and Playboy. He released the EP Revenge in 2017. He released two full-length albums, Hate Love and No Love, in 2017, as well as non-album singles "Бургер" ("Burger") and "Я роняю запад" ("I'm Dropping the West"), the latter a sarcastic take on Russian patriotism with a music video that features the rapper riding a bear and standing on a burning American flag.

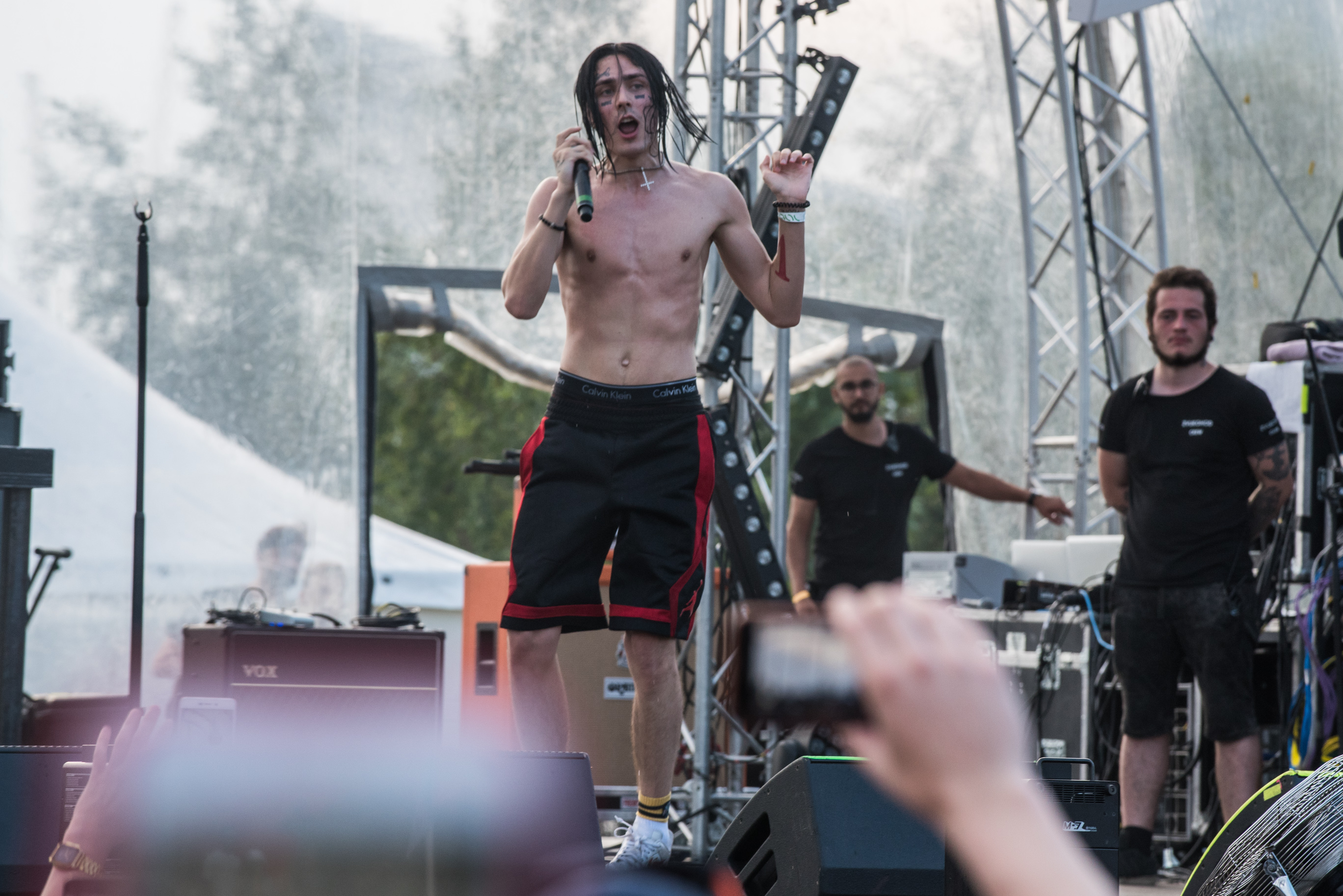
Face performing at VK Fest in 2018

Face's songs are often profane, sexually explicit, and contain references to drugs, which has led to socially conservative law enforcement in Russia to cancel his concerts. In response to this censorship, he released a politically charged album, Пути неисповедимы ("Mysterious Ways"), on 2 September 2018, that criticizes the corruption and social problems in Russia, which he has described as a "third world country." Face had received offers from President Vladimir Putin's public relations officials to produce pro-government content for the Kremlin, but turned it down.

His latest album, Slime, was released on 1 February 2019 and spawned the singles "Woof", "Мой калашников" ("My Kalashnikov"), and "Спасательный Круг" ("Lifebuoy"). He also released the titicular soundtrack song for the Mikhail Idov drama film Юморист ("The Humorist").

In March 2022 he criticized the Russian invasion of Ukraine, and subsequently emigrated to Poland, noting that he faces arrest in Russia for his critique of the government. Despite his music being in Russian and most of his fans being Russians, he pulled his music from Russian online stores to express his protest. In Poland he participated in a concert collecting funds for Ukrainian refugees, apologizing to them for Russian actions.

=== Artistry and image ===
Dryomin's hip hop influences include American rappers such as ASAP Rocky, Kanye West, Playboi Carti, Lil Pump and Lil Uzi Vert. Outside of rap, he also enjoys soul artist Marvin Gaye, and rock bands Best Coast, and Nirvana.

Dryomin has several tattoos, including the words "Hate" and "Love" below each of his eyes, the word "Numb" on his forehead, the Playboy bunny and Vlone logos on each of his forearms, and the words "Rock" and "Star" on the back of each hand.

== Personal life ==
Dryomin has been diagnosed with major depressive disorder and experiences panic attacks. He received treatment for mental illness for two weeks at a psychiatric hospital. He references this event in his song "Burger": "I'm so fucking crazy, I was in the loony bin." The video for the song was partially filmed outside a psychiatric hospital named after former Moscow mayor Nikolay Alekseyev.

Dryomin moved from Ufa to Moscow with his brother Bogdan in April 2017. He has been dating Russian YouTuber Maryana Ro since September 2017.

As a result of the 2022 Russian invasion of Ukraine, Dryomin left Russia. He announced in an Instagram post on 12 March that he was in a foreign country, and would not return to Russia or pay taxes there. On 8 April, the Ministry of Justice designated him as a "foreign agent". On 18 July 2025, the Russian Interior Ministry added Dryomin to the federal wanted list, though it did not disclose the charges. In December 2025, Dryomin was charged with violating the Russian foreign agent law.

== Discography ==
=== Albums ===
- 2017 – Hate Love
- 2017 – No Love
- 2018 – Пути неисповедимы ("Mysterious Ways")
- 2019 – Slime
- 2019 – 12
- 2021 – "Искренний" (Sincere)
- 2023 – "Ничего хорошего" (Nothing Good)
- 2024 - "Бог рэпа" (Rap God)

=== EPs ===
- 2015 – Проклятая печать ("Cursed Seal")
- 2016 – Vlone
- 2016 – Mayhem
- 2016 – Playboy
- 2017 – Revenge
- 2021 – Жизнь удалась ("Life is Good")
- 2021 – Варвар ("Barbarian")
- 2021 – Krazy ("Crazy")

=== Singles ===
- 2015 – "Веб-панк" ("Web Punk")
- 2015 – "Саб-Зиро (Freestyle)" ("Sub-Zero")
- 2015 – "Kanji"
- 2015 – "Mask" (feat. heartsnøw)
- 2015 – "Murder" (feat. DJ Smokey)
- 2015 – "All Good"
- 2015 – "Кот" ("Cat")
- 2016 – "Skate"
- 2016 – "Baby Face"
- 2016 – "Blazer"
- 2016 – "Megan Fox" (feat. Enique)
- 2016 – "Payback"
- 2016 – "Vans"
- 2016 – "January"
- 2016 – "Vlone"
- 2016 – "Мне похуй" ("I Don't Give a Fuck")
- 2016 – "Я ебанутый" ("I'm Crazy")
- 2016 – "Иди нахуй" (feat. Lizer) ("Get the Fuck Out")
- 2017 – "Бургер" ("Burger")
- 2017 – "Baby"
- 2017 – "Я роняю запад" ("I'm Dropping the West")
- 2017 – "24 на 7" ("24/7")
- 2018 – "ЗЕМФИРА" ("ZEMFIRA")
- 2018 – "162"
- 2019 – "Southside Baby"
- 2019 – "Woof"
- 2019 – "Мой калашников" ("My kalashnikov")
- 2019 – "Юморист" ("Humorist")
- 2019 – "Почему это лучше, чем твой полноценный альбом?"("Why is this better than your full album?")
- 2020 – "Надежда" ("Hope")
- 2020 – "Просто" ("Just")
- 2020 – "Рейман" ("Rayman")
- 2023 – "Прада" ("Prada")
- 2024 – "Ненавижу" ("Hate")
- 2024 – "От Земли" ("From the Earth")

=== Videography ===
- 2016 – "Гоша Рубчинский" ("Gosha Rubchinskiy")
- 2016 – "Megan Fox" (feat. Enique)
- 2016 – "Бляяя Фэйс вот ты флексишь" ("Daaamn, Face, You Be Flexing")
- 2017 – "Мне похуй" ("I Don't Give a Fuck")
- 2017 – "Бургер" ("Burger")
- 2018 – "Я роняю запад" ("I'm Dropping the West")
- 2019 – "Woof"
- 2019 – "Мой калашников" ("My Kalashnikov")
- 2019 – "Юморист" ("Humorist")
- 2019 – "Спасательный Круг" ("Lifebuoy")
- 2020 – "Просто" ("Just")
- 2020 – "Рэйман" ("Rayman")
- 2021 – "Плачу" ("Pay")
- 2021 – "Ван Дейк" ("Van Dijk")
