= Vacio =

Vacio or Vacío, meaning "void" or "emptiness" in Spanish, may refer to:

- El vacío, 2023 Chilean romantic drama film
- Emptiness (film) (Spanish title: Vacío), 2020 Ecuadorian drama film
- Natividad Vacío (1912-1996), American actor
- Vacío, single by Luis Fonsi
- Vacío (Nikolai Vasilyev), Russian rapper
