= Demna =

Demna (Georgian: დემნა) is a Georgian masculine name. Notable people with the name include:

- Demna of Georgia (died c. 1178), Georgian royal prince
- Demna Gvasalia (born 1981), Georgian fashion designer
