= Gosha Rubchinskiy =

Russian fashion designer and photographer (born 1984)

- Георгий Рубчинский
- Born: Georgiy Aleksandrovich Rubchinskiy; 29 June 1984 (age 42); Moscow, Russian SFSR, Soviet Union
- Other name: Гоша Рубчинский
- Education: Moscow College of Technology and Design
- Occupations: Designer; photographer

Georgiy Aleksandrovich Rubchinskiy (Russian: Георгий Александрович Рубчинский; born 29 June 1984), known professionally as Gosha Rubchinskiy (Russian: Гоша Рубчинский), is a Russian fashion designer and photographer.

Rubchinskiy's work is known for its collaborative sportswear brands and Russian cultural influence.

== Early life and education ==
Rubchinskiy was born in Moscow on 29 June, 1984. From a young age, Rubchinskiy aspired to work in fashion. While studying at the Moscow College of Technology and Design, he began working in hair and makeup, which introduced him to Russia's fashion circles.

== Career ==
Rubchinskiy launched his men's fashion label in 2008. In 2012, he began to work with Comme des Garçons to handle production, sales and marketing of the brand. In the 2010s, he dominated the fashion scene with his post-Soviet-inspired streetwear.

In 2016, Rubchinskiy launched a skateboard label called RASSVET (stylized "PACCBET" in Cyrillic) . The label offers more affordable options, with a focus on t-shirts and sweats. In 2020 RASSVET collaborated with the Pushkin State Museum of Fine Arts to create a series of items inspired by paintings and prints from the Japanese Edo period.

Rubchinskiy presented a photographic exhibition, The North Wind, at Moscow's Triumph Gallery in October 2021. He also previously worked as a stylist and set designer for Litvinova's theatrical piece of the same name, staged in 2017.

In 2023, Rubchinskiy joined Yeezy as the head of design. In February 2025, he announced the end of his collaboration with Yeezy which began after West lost his Adidas collaboration deal. The same year, Rubchinskiy relaunched the Eponymous label.

== Influence ==
Rubchinskiy's style is influenced by Russian culture, especially its working-class youth. His collections are characterized by "sportswear silhouettes, roughly-fitting garments and unique color palettes". Graphic prints that feature Cyrillic typography and the colors of Russia’s flag are also found in his work.

He has collaborated with labels such as Fila, Sergio Tacchini, Kappa, Adidas Originals, Reebok and Vans. In 2018, he collaborated with Burberry for its Spring/Summer collection.

== Controversies ==
In December 2018, a 16-year-old boy alleged that Rubchinskiy requested explicit photographs of him via text message, including screenshots as evidence. Shortly thereafter, another man claimed that Rubchinskiy requested explicit photographs. Rubchinskiy denied both accusations, but shut down the brand in 2018 due to the scandal. During the 2025 relaunch of the eponymous label, Rubchinskiy included a new casting policy that prevented casting opportunities via text message, and implemented the presence of a casting team.

== See also ==
- Virgil Abloh
- Balenciaga
- Vetements
- Raf Simons
- Demna Gvasalia
