= Cité de la Dentelle et de la Mode =

Museum of lace in Pas de Calais, France

Coordinates: 50.95033°N 1.85956°E

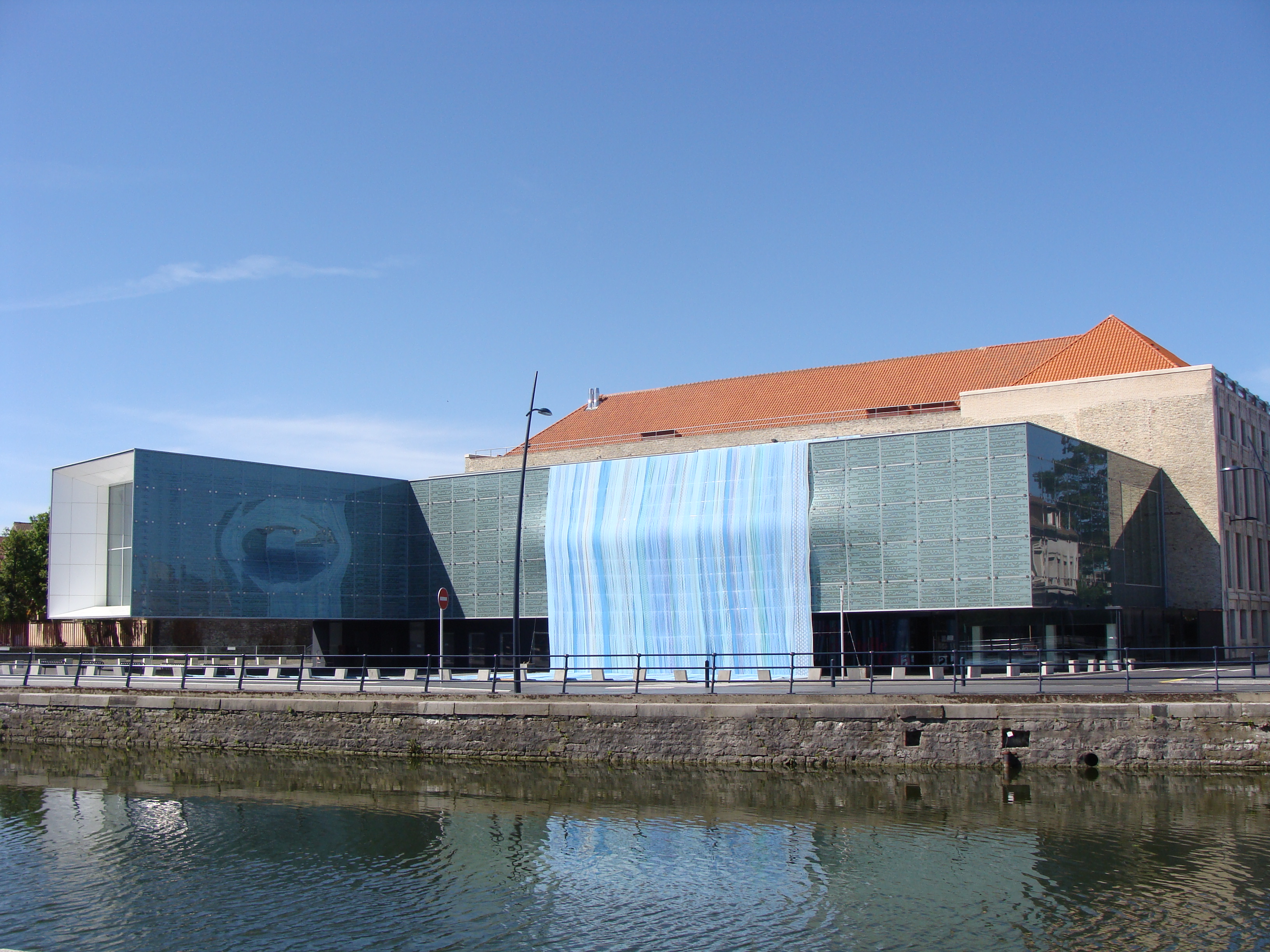

The Cité de la Dentelle et de la Mode is a museum of lace in Pas-de-Calais in northern France. It is one of two museums in France to celebrate machine lace making, the other being Musée des Beaux-arts et de la Dentelle d'Alençon. The museum is an Anchor point on the European Route of Industrial Heritage. Cité de la Dentelle et de la Mode is a museum of both fashion and industry, its vast galleries present the techniques, the lingerie, and haute couture associated with this prestigious textile, as well as its most contemporary aspects. Derived from a technique invented in England in the nineteenth century, today lace woven on Leavers looms is primarily produced in Northern France. The Museum for Lace and Fashion is a focal hub for fashion. In its exhibition gallery, it showcases great couturiers and renowned young designers alike (Cristóbal Balenciaga, Anne Valérie Harsh, Iris Van Herpen, Hubert de Givenchy, On Aura Tout Vu, Yves Saint Laurent.)

== History ==
- 1816 – the first Leavers loom, made in England, arrives in Calais. Four years later 500 women are working on finishing the lace.
- 1824 – 40 manufacturers run 55 looms and employ 137 workers. 900 women complete the products.
- 1874 – the Boulart factory was built in two main phases, consisting of three main buildings on four levels arranged in a U around a central courtyard. In the interior square, two stair towers allowed the workers to access the floors by passageways and this without going through the competing workshops. This architecture of large factories allowed through the central courtyard an easy access to the workshops and a spatial layout responding to a new organization of work. The introduction of the steam engine justifies its location.
- 1927 – 170 trades resonate their bobbin carts, their number increases until the First World War to reach 2,744 Leavers trades and 31,000 employees.
- 1932 – the crisis put an end to 1,200 professions and the Second World War reduced the number to 319. Calais was then the world leader in lace.
- knitted lace that imitates mechanical Leavers weaving sounded the death knell for Leavers lace with the new Raschel, Jacquardtronic and Textronic looms.
- 1987 – the city acquires the site.
- 1991 – project feasibility studies
- 1995 – a team is formed for the foreshadowing of the city of lace around a curator.
- 1999 – the architects of the city are Henri Rivière and Alain Moatti, winners of the competition for the rehabilitation of the former Boulart factory. Their twenty-seven million euro project was to deploy the Cité over 7,800 m2 spread over a contemporary building on the Quai de la Gendarmerie side with a glass facade evoking the sensual curves of women, screen-printed with Métier Jacquard cardboard patterns and the old factory made of existing yellow brick masonry accented with the blue, orange and red hues of the window glazing.
- 2009 – on 14, 15, 16, 17 and 18 May the project is carried out and as part of the Long Night of Museums a monumental and temporary work by the Italian artist Maria Dompé was presented in sound and light until 24 May 2009. The work required 80 kilometers of lace at a cost of €210,000.
- 2010 – building rehabilitation project by the Bordeaux architecture firm Flint.
