= Maryana Ro =

Russian-born YouTuber (born 1999)

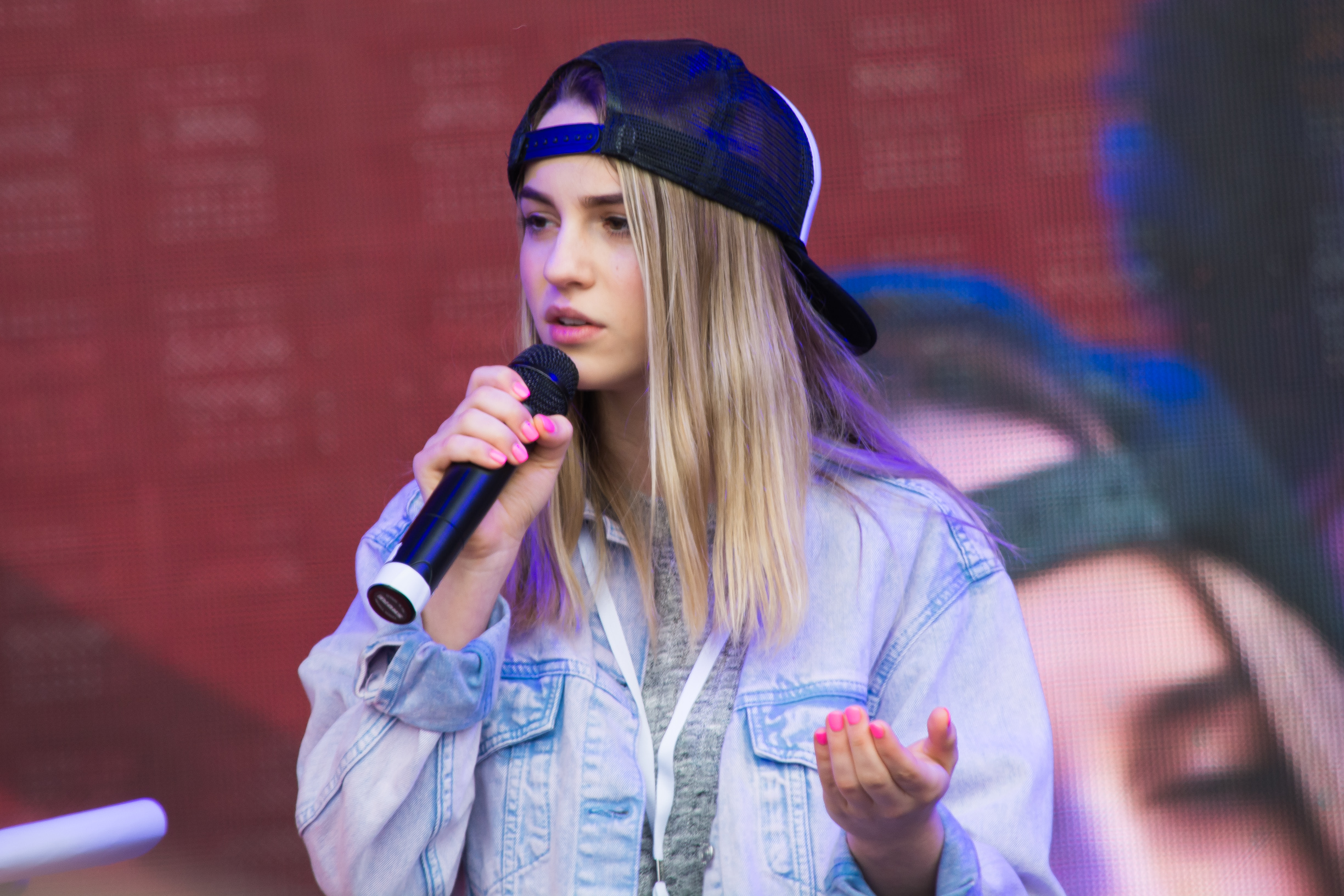
- Maryana Ro in 2016
- Born: Maryana Viktorovna Rozhkova; October 7, 1999 (age 27); Yuzhno-Sakhalinsk, Russia

YouTube information
- Channel: Maryana Ro
- Years active: 2014–present
- Subscribers: 6.55 million
- Views: 779 million
- Last updated: 2 September 2024

Maryana Andreyevna Rozhkova (Russian: Марьяна Андреевна Рожкова; born October 7, 1999, Yuzhno-Sakhalinsk), better known as Maryana Ro (Russian: Марьяна Ро) is a Russian vlogger, singer and actress. She became an idol of teenagers in the 2010s, along with vloggers such as Roma Zholud and EeOneGuy.

== Biography ==
She was born on October 7, 1999, in Yuzhno-Sakhalinsk. She has a younger sister, Maresya, and an older brother, Miroslav.

In 2015, she entered a relationship with vlogger EeOneGuy. In December 2016, it became known that the couple had broken up.

In September 2017, it became known about a relationship between Maryana Rozhkova and rapper FACE.

In July 2020, she came out as pansexual. In 2020, Maryana revealed that Ivan Dremin was her legal husband.

Since January 2022, Maryana Ro has been living in Japan after leaving Russia.

== Career ==
Since 2013, she has been a vlogger on YouTube. Many attribute Rozhkova's rise in popularity to her close relationship with vlogger EeOneGuy.

On September 19, 2015, she released her first music single, thus launching her music career.

Maryana's musical career has often been compared to that of Roma Zholud, who also gained popularity at the age of 15 on Russian YouTube.

== Filmography ==
Year	Type	Title	Role
2016	Comedy	Vzlomat Blogerov	Herself
2017	TV show	Hype Camp	member of the jury in the selection of participants in Moscow and a guest on one of the programs
