= Vacío (rapper) =

Russian rapper (born 1998)

- Born: Nikolai Mikhailovich Vasilyev; February 13, 1998 (age 28); Yekaterinburg, Russia
- Genre: Trap
- Occupation: rapper

Nikolai Mikhailovich Vasilyev (Russian: Николай Михайлович Васильев; born 13 February 1998), better known as his stage name Vacío (Russian: Васио), is a Russian rapper.

== Biography ==
Vasilyev was born on 13 February 1998 in Yekaterinburg. In his early years he obtained musical education through classes on piano, and later, guitar.

Later, he began to get involved in rap and create compositions in this genre.

=== Almost Naked Party ===
On 21 December 2023, Vasilyev attended Nastya Ivleeva's "almost naked" party wearing only a sock to cover his genitals. The event sparked widespread public outrage in Russia and beyond. On 22 December, Vasilyev released a public apology video, stating that he does not support LGBT movements, did not intend to promote any agenda, and condemns the movement's supporters.

Vasilyev commented the idea for the sock came from a friend of his who suggested it to him and that he did not imagine that there would be such a huge and resonant response from the public.

Male attendees at the party were seen in a video licking the sock, which led the Lefortovo District Court in Moscow on 27 December to declare the event as "propaganda of non-traditional sexual relations". A video was also posted online of the sock being quickly taken off Vacio's penis by another attendee at the party, and Vacio commented that while "...he regretted his first act, [wearing the sock] ...the second arrest was completely incomprehensible to him." as the sock was taken off by other people at the party who posted a video of it online.

Vasilyev was found guilty of petty hooliganism and spreading "gay propaganda" and the court ruled that the "almost naked" party had spread "propaganda of non-traditional sexual relations." Vasilyev was imprisoned for 15 days and fined 200,000 rubles. At the end of the 15 day sentence, Vasilyev's detention was extended for another ten days again due to petty hooliganism and he was taken to the military conscription office and handed a military summons. Authorities discussed sending him to serve in the military orchestra. At first it was not clear why Vacio was summoned to the military recruitment center as he was legally unfit to serve in the armed forces due to an unspecified medical condition and it was also commented that "...Vasilyev, 'doesn't face the threat of serving in the army because he had allegedly failed the military-medical commission in his native Yekaterinburg for health reasons.'"

On the 14 May 2024, Vasilyev's representative announced that the rapper had left Russia for the United States. This came after he failed to appear at the military conscription office the previous day. Singer Yana Djalu, a friend of Vasilyev, confirmed his departure, stating that Vasilyev felt "pressured" and "not free" in Russia. Vasilyev then later confirmed that he had travelled to Yerevan, Armenia and not the United States and that he had been telling his friends that he had moved to the United States as he was concerned of there being any possibility that he could be extradited from Armenia and he wanted to keep a low profile. Reports also suggested Vasilyev considered renouncing his Russian citizenship, although no official confirmation has been made regarding his emigration or citizenship status.

On 7 January 2025, the St. Petersburg club MOD hosted a concert by the rock group Schenki, during which the group's lead singer Maxim Tesli (real name Maxim Moiseev) went on stage wearing a sock on his penis during the performance. The sock fell to the floor and the singer appeared completely naked in front of the audience for a short moment, but then went backstage and got dressed. A video of the incident ended up on the Internet and outraged Ekaterina Mizulina, who considered the singer's actions to be an imitation of Vacío. On the night of 9 January, the singer was arrested at Pulkovo Airport - he intended to fly to Yekaterinburg, and from there to Kazakhstan.

As noted in the media, Maxim Tesli appeared in public in a similar form back in 2016, and a number of foreign performers even earlier. It was unclear whether Tesli's concert appearance was intended as a gesture of support for Vacio.

== Discography ==
=== Studio albums ===
- 2019 — "88"
- 2020 — "Неожиданно глубоко"
- 2020 — "Индепендент"
- 2022 — "Отец"

=== Singles ===
- 2019 — "Любовь" (with OG Buda)
- 2020 — "Punk" (with OFFMi)
- 2020 — "Спокойствие"
- 2020 — "Франция" (with AP)
- 2021 — "Soda" (with Eldzhey)
- 2021 — "Soda (Remixes)" (with Eldzhey)
- 2021 — "Трейнспоттинг" (with Rravingriot)
- 2021 — "Осень"
- 2022 — "Project X"
- 2022 — "Skate" (with "ЛСП")
- 2022 — "Я / Мы животные"
- 2022 — "Уу-хуу" (with "Пошлой Молли")
- 2022 — "Притон" (with Morgenshtern)
- 2022 — "Когда..."
- 2022 — "Фотик"
- 2022 — "XXX"
- 2022 — "Дурочка" (with Mipunga)
- 2023 — "11111" (with Mipunga)
- 2023 — "Знакомство" (with Nxn)
- 2023 — "Папа"
- 2023 — "Песня двух романтиков" (with Dima Bilan)
- 2023 — "Уроды боятся красоты"
- 2023 — "Внутривенно"
- 2023 — "Утки 2" (with Mipunga)

=== Guest appearances ===
Year	Track	Singers	Album	Ref.
2018	"Танцы на костях"	ВесЪ feat. Vacío	Y	
2018	"Caramba!"	ВесЪ feat. Vacío	—	
2019	"Почему не падает небо"	Boris Grebenshchikov & "Счастливые люди" feat. Vacío	—	
2019	"Uan"	Maib feat. Vacío	Sugar Nugan	
2020	"Биг дерьмо"	Мезза feat. Vacío	"Ванхана"	
2020	"Друзья"	Feduk feat. Vacío	"Останься"	
2020	"Надеюсь что ты ждёшь так же как я"	Enique & Vacío	"Доброе утро"	
2020	"Не плачь"	Maib feat. Vacío	Epilogue	
2020	"Они говорили"	Tenderlybae feat. Vacío	"Юность"	
2020	"Опиум"	Enique & Vacío	"Доброе утро"	
2020	"Свали"	Мезза feat. Vacío	"Ванхана"	
2020	"Смех (Remix)"	OFFMi feat. Vacío, Hugo Loud & Suroknablokk	"КПД 100"	
2020	"Ты меня ранишь"	«Мальбэк» feat. Vacío	—	
2020	"Яд"	Zavet feat. Vacío	—	
2021	"А о и и э и а"	Alizade feat. Vacío	Molly Mo Music	
2021	"ВПНП"	Anikv feat. Vacío	—	
2021	"Воины (Freestyle)"	Pretty Scream feat. Vacío & AP	Leave Your Bones	
2021	"Запомню"	White Punk feat. Vacío	"Сириус"	
2021	"Красный закат"	Лауд feat. Vacío	"Красный закат"	
2022	"План"	Lizer feat. Vacío	"Оттенки"	
2023	"Антидепрессанты"	«Мальбэк» feat. Vacío	—	
2023	"Невыносимо"	Pinq feat. Vacío	"Луна сегодня красивая, правда?"	
2023	"Останься"	White Punk feat. Vacío	Wockstar!	
2023	"Танцуй со мной"	GeeGun feat. Vacío & Mayot	Bang	
2023	"Bbbitch!"	Saluki feat. Vacío & Bato	Wild East	
