= EeOneGuy =

Ukrainian vlogger and musician (born 1996)

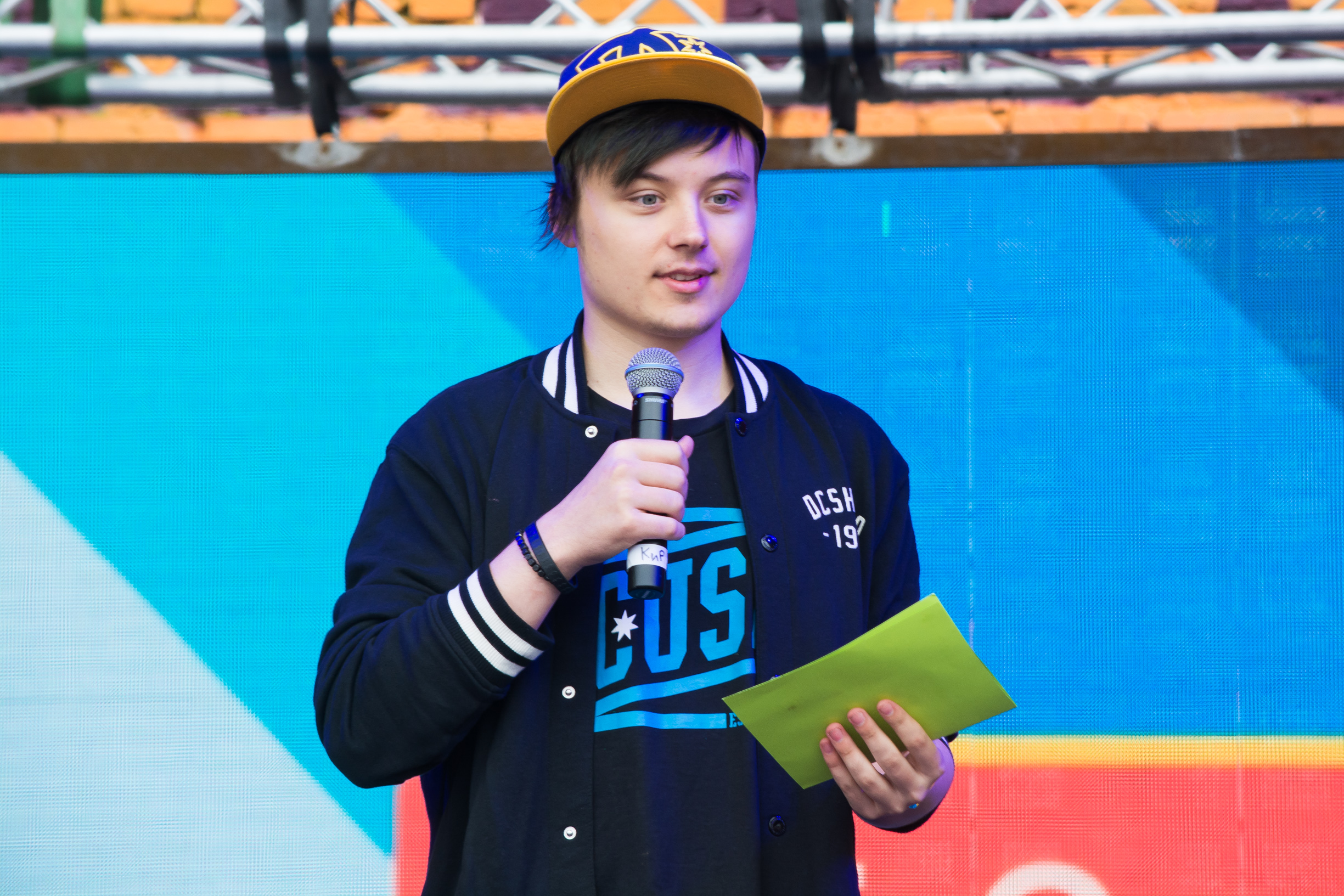
- EeOneGuy in 2016
- Born: Ivan Romanovych Rudskyi; January 19, 1996 (age 30); Hannivka, Kamianske Raion, Dnipropetrovsk Oblast, Ukraine
- Other names: IVAN; AWEN; Ivangai

YouTube information
- Channel: EeOneGuy
- Years active: 2013–2017; 2020–present
- Genres: Vlog; let's play; reaction; music
- Subscribers: 16.5 million
- Views: 3.8 billion
- Last updated: 3 May 2025

Ivan Romanovych Rudskyi (Ukrainian: Іван Романович Рудський; born January 19, 1996), known online as EeOneGuy (Russian: Ивангай; Ukrainian: Іванґай), is a Ukrainian web-based vlogger and musician, best known for his Let's Play commentaries, comedy videos and vlogs on YouTube. He was once the most popular YouTuber in Ukraine and Russia. After that, he stopped being active on social media, sometimes appearing on different shows.

== Early life ==
Ivan Rudskyi was born in Hannivka, Dnipropetrovsk Oblast, on 19 January 1996. He studied at school 127 in Kryvyi Rih.

== Career ==
Rudskyi created his YouTube channel on 19 March 2013, and began uploading on 24 March 2013.

At first, all his videos were filmed in Ukraine. Then he met his girlfriend Maryana Ro and moved to Sapporo, Japan, where he made a lot of content. In April 2017, he became the most popular Russian-speaking YouTuber.

In 2017, he left YouTube and social media to study in Warsaw and focus on beatmaking. In 2018, he signed a contract with Russian YouTube network Yoola, and the next year he released his first song in English. In late 2019, he released three songs under the new stage name AWEN. In 2020, he started making videos for YouTube again as well as releasing new songs. He used the AWEN name for songs in English and EeOneGuy for songs in Russian.

After Russia invaded Ukraine in 2022, he started to make songs in Ukrainian, apparently cutting ties with the Yoola label.

== Filmography ==
Year	Title	Role
2016	Взломать блогеров	Himself

== Discography ==
=== As EeOneGuy ===
==== Singles ====
Name	Year	Album
"Демон"	2021	Non-Album singles
"Нафиг"	2021	Non-Album singles
"Kyivstar"	2022	Non-Album singles
"Теплий дощ"	2022	Non-Album singles
"Еней"	2022	Non-Album singles

==== Music videos ====
Name	Year	Notes
"Песня задрота"	2013	More than 2 million views.
"#ДЕЛАЙПОСВОЕМУ"	2015	More than 48 million views.
"Хаю-Хай"	2016	Featuring Trinergy. More than 34 million views.
"ЛИМОНЫ"	2016	More than 17 million views.
"One Guy"	2017	More than 10 million views.
"Демон"	2021	More than 3 million views.
"Нафиг"	2021	More than 2 million views.

=== As IVAN ===
==== Singles ====
Name	Year	Album
"My Heart"	2019	Non-album single

=== As AWEN ===
==== Singles ====
Name	Year	Album
"Angst"	2020	Non-album single
"Flame"	2020	Non-album single
"Sugar"	2020	Non-album single
"Gravity"	2020	Non-album single
"Porsche"	2022	Non-album single
"Cash"	2022	Non-album single
"Lowkey"	2022	Non-album single

== Awards ==
Year	Category	Work	Result
2014	OOPS! Choice Awards	LifeStyle Blogger	Won
