= Vetements =

Luxury fashion brand

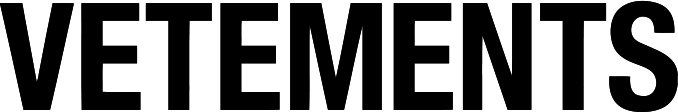
- Industry: Fashion
- Founded: 2014; 12 years ago
- Founders: Demna Gvasalia, Guram Gvasalia
- Headquarters: Zürich, Switzerland
- Products: Clothing, shoes, accessories
- Owner: Vetements Group AG
- Website: vetements.com

Vetements (stylised VETEMENTS) (from vêtements [vɛtmɑ͂]; French for "clothes") started in 2014 as a Swiss-French luxury fashion house founded by Georgian fashion designers Demna Gvasalia and Guram Gvasalia. Initially established as a design collective, the label became known for oversized proportions, reconstructed garments, streetwear and the reinterpretation of familiar clothing and imagery.

The brand experienced near-immediate success, with Demna being hired to Balenciaga after only three collections at Vetements. In 2019, Demna left the brand. In 2021, Guram Gvasalia was appointed as the new creative director.

== History ==
=== 2014–2016: first collections and breakthrough ===
The first Vetements collection was presented at a Paris gallery during the AW14–15 season. Vetements's early designs were clean-lined and predominantly monochrome, with exaggerated proportions, extra-long sleeves and slits adding visual interest to otherwise minimally embellished garments. By May 2014, the debut collection had secured 27 stockists.

Vetements developed this approach in its second collection, SS15, which marked the label's first runway show and was presented at the Espace Pierre Cardin in Paris. The collection continued the manipulation of proportion through wide-legged trousers, cropped knitwear, thigh-high splits and sleeves extending over the hands.

Vetements's third collection, AW15–16, was shown during Paris Fashion Week at Le Dépôt, a sex club in Paris. It consolidated the label's early design vocabulary through high-waisted vintage jeans, spliced sweatshirts, oversized bomber jackets and tailored coats, floral tea dresses, and garments reconstructed from firefighter and security uniforms. Vogue critic Nicole Phelps noted that the collection’s workwear, grunge and deconstructive references were not individually unprecedented, but distinguished the collection for combining them with technical skill and an unusually abrasive presentation within Paris Fashion Week. The collection became Vetements's breakthrough: the collective advanced to the final of the 2015 LVMH Prize for Young Fashion Designers and 26th ANDAM Fashion Award..

The following SS16 collection, presented at Le Président, a Chinese restaurant in Paris's Belleville neighbourhood, featured a yellow DHL-branded T-shirt. By placing imagery associated with an inexpensive courier uniform in a luxury collection, the shirt made Vetements's treatment of ordinary workwear and commercial branding an international talking point; it sold out despite its high price and became one of the label's best-known designs.

The AW16–17 show took place at the American Cathedral of Paris. It marked the label's first runway presentation to include garments designed as menswear.

During this period, Vetements gained increased visibility within the fashion industry and popular culture, with its clothing worn by musicians and other public figures.

=== 2016–2018: calendar change, collaborations and international recognition ===
For the SS17 season, Vetements were invited to show on the first evening of Paris Haute Couture Fashion Week, during store hours at the French department store, Galeries Lafayette underneath its famous cupola. Vetements worked with 18 different brands, among them: Alpha Industries, Brioni, Canada Goose, Carhartt, Champion, Comme des Garçons, Dr. Martens, Juicy Couture, Levi's, Mackintosh, Manolo Blahnik, Reebok and Schott NYC. The collection was intended to reinterpret each company's most recognisable products through Vetements's construction and proportions.

The AW17–18 collection, titled "Stereotypes", was presented at Centre Georges Pompidou, a modern-art museum in Paris, in January 2017. Each look represented a social or subcultural archetype, including a police officer, punk, metalhead, vagabond, bouncer, emo, gabber and fashionable Parisian woman. The collection was principally inspired by Exactitudes, an ongoing photographic project begun in 1994 by Dutch photographer Ari Versluis and profiler Ellie Uyttenbroek.

The SS18 collection was introduced through a "NO SHOW" event, consisting of a concert and exhibit of photographs of the new collection shot by Demna Gvasalia around Zürich, Switzerland, where the company had recently relocated its headquarters.

Vetements returned to the runway for AW18–19, presenting the collection outside the official calendar at the Marché Paul Bert Serpette antiques market in Saint-Ouen, outside Paris.

=== 2018–2019: final Demna collections and departure ===
Vetements’s tenth collection, SS19, drew on the Gvasalia brothers’ upbringing in and eventual departure from war-torn Georgia. The show was held in Paris on 1 July 2018, beneath the Boulevard Périphérique. Many street-cast models were flown in from Georgia for the show. The collection included Vetements's collaboration with Oakley.

The AW19–20 show, titled "Anti-Social", took place at the French National Museum of Natural History. Its themes included the dark web, online anonymity and surveillance. Face coverings, distorted corporate signs, upside-down garments, anarchy symbols and parkas with viewing holes appeared alongside the house’s familiar tailoring and printed dresses; one look referenced the black turtleneck associated with Steve Jobs.

The SS20 collection was presented on 20 June in a McDonald's restaurant on the Champs-Élysées. The show addressed consumerism, corporate power, political populism and environmental waste through uniforms, altered logos, reconstructed denim and slogans such as "Hello I am Capitalism". It was the final Vetements collection created under Demna’s direction.

=== 2020–2021: post-Demna period and collective design ===
The AW20–21 collection, credited to the label's design team, was presented in January 2020 at Garage Amelot in Paris. The show was staged in near-darkness, with guests asked to illuminate the runway using their phone flashlights. The collection retained house signatures—oversized tailoring, puffers, floral dresses, uniforms and slogans. Vogue reported that several models appeared to have been celebrity lookalikes, with suggested resemblances including Kate Moss, Snoop Dogg, Mike Tyson and others, although Vetements did not confirm that the resemblances were intentional.

During the pandemic, Vetements presented multiple collections in a digital lookbook format.

=== 2021–2024: new creative direction and return to physical shows ===
The AW22–23 collection, released digitally in November 2021, examined new forms of status and wealth associated with social media and cryptocurrency. All but one of its 72 looks featured a face covering. The collection also extended Vetements's approach to tailoring: shirts, trousers, jackets, and coats were made from jersey ordinarily used for T-shirts and hoodies. On 15 December 2021, the house announced that Guram Gvasalia had been appointed creative director, with AW22–23 identified as his first collection in that capacity.

Vetements released its SS24 collection in June 2023. The collection extended the label's oversized design language through a "16XL" concept, scaling hoodies, bomber jackets, suits, and jeans to as much as 16 times the size of its existing oversized patterns. The collection included T-shirt-based ball gowns with skirts measuring six meteres in circumference developed with couturier Elie Saab. In July 2023, Vogue ranked Vetements's S/S 2024 collection second among the season's most-viewed menswear shows on Vogue Runway. The publication characterised the collection as an “anti-AI” exploration of exaggerated streetwear and eveningwear silhouettes.

For the AW24–25 season, Vetements returned to the Paris Fashion Week womenswear calendar. The 90-look collection continued its exploration of extreme proportions. Georgina Rodríguez walked the show wearing a floor-length red jersey dress modelled on Cristiano Ronaldo's football jersey and bearing his signature.

=== 2024–present: first Met Gala, anniversary show and current collections ===
In May 2024, Vetements dressed rapper Doja Cat for the annual Met Gala. In the days before the gala, Doja Cat appeared publicly in Vetements looks made from transparent plastic wrap, a bedsheet, clothing packaging, and a leather interpretation of a Vetements garment bag, prompting speculation about the collaboration. At the gala, she wore a floor-length white cotton T-shirt gown treated to appear wet, which was presented as a conceptual interpretation of “The Garden of Time” dress code through cotton as a floral reference.

The SS25 collection was shown on 27 September 2024 in the disused basement of a former shopping centre in Paris's Montparnasse district. Planned as the label's tenth-anniversary presentation, the show used a mound of deadstock clothing at its entrance to position the collection as a response to overproduction and consumption within the luxury industry. DIY was the main theme of the collection, shown through deconstructed garments, exposed tags and mismatched fabrics. The collection revisited motifs from Vetements's early work, including a motorcycle outfit worn by Travis Scott and DHL-branded packing tape fashioned into a minidress for Gigi Hadid. During the finale, Anok Yai improvised a sudden run from the runway while wearing a voluminous bridal gown. This unscripted moment circulated widely on social media as the show's “runaway bride” moment.

The SS26 collection, shown in Paris in 2025, continued the house's use of exaggerated proportions and face coverings, and included garments with open or transparent backs, outerwear with high "privacy collars" and tailoring with forward-projecting shoulders.

Vetements designs were featured in Costume Art exhibition at the Metropolitan Museum of Art's Costume Institute. The presentation included a tattoo top designed by Demna for SS19 collection and a show look designed by Guram Gvasalia from AW24-25 collection.

The SS27 collection was shown in June 2026. It was Vetements's first appearance on the Paris Fashion Week menswear calendar. It was inspired by office drescode amd paired usually restrained tailoring with disrupted construction: neckties were reversed, jacket sleeves left unfinished, shirts extended below waistbands and outerwear was turned inside out. Menswear and womenswear were connected through shared tailoring and shoes with integrated jewelry. Reviewing the collection, A Shaded View on Fashion wrote that Gvasalia had revisited familiar Vetements signatures with renewed restraint and that the collection doubled down on the house's original language; Denimology noted that presentation shifted from spectacle towards precision. It was a runway debut for Sean Preston and Jayden James, Britney Spears’s Sons. Sharon Stone closed the show, marking her first runway appearance in more than three decades.

== Design and influence ==
Vetements developed its design language by treating familiar garments as material for alteration. Vintage jeans were cut apart and reassembled, while hoodies, bomber jackets, trench coats and tailored jackets were enlarged, displaced or given elongated sleeves and exaggerated shoulders. Fashion scholars Adam Geczy and Vicki Karaminas have placed the label within a deconstructivist lineage associated with Martin Margiela, noting its use of repurposed clothing, visible construction and distorted proportion, as well as the addition of streetwear and contemporary urban references. Robin Givhan described Vetements as one of the labels redefining luxury by turning oversized outerwear, work shirts and other commonplace garments into objects of desire.

Vetements's DHL-branded T-shirt, sold as part of the SS16 collection, became a prominent example of this approach. Writing in "The Guardian", Lauren Cochrane situated it within traditions including Marcel Duchamp's readymades, pop art and the détournement of commercial signs, and framed its reception as a debate over whether it was a "scam or subversion". Geczy and Karaminas interpreted Vetements's treatment of corporate logos as a way of interrupting their original meanings and demonstrating how context affects perceived value.

Fashion publications subsequently credited Vetements with influencing both the appearance and presentation of luxury fashion. In 2016, Vogue described the influence of the label's floral tea dresses, asymmetrical hoodies, widened shoulders and elongated sleeves as spreading rapidly through the industry. In a 2019 retrospective, British Vogue credited the label with elevating deconstructed casualwear to luxury status, challenging conventional ideas of ugliness, experimenting with the fashion calendar and presenting a collection composed entirely of collaborations.
