= Demna (designer) =

Georgian fashion designer

Demna დემნა
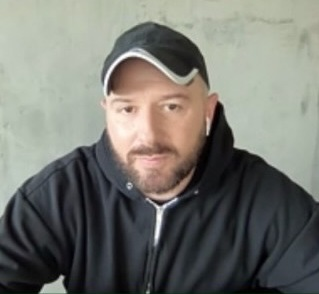
- Born: Demna Gvasalia; 25 March 1981 (age 45); Sokhumi, Georgian SSR, USSR
- Education: Tbilisi State University; Royal Academy of Fine Arts
- Occupation: Fashion designer
- Labels: Gucci (2025－); Balenciaga (2015－2025); Vetements (2014－2019); Louis Vuitton (2013－2015)
- Spouse: Loïk Gomez (m. 2017)
- Relatives: Guram Gvasalia (brother)
- Awards: Order of Honor

Demna Gvasalia (Georgian: დემნა გვასალია dem-NAH gvah-SAH-lee-AH; born 25 March 1981), known mononymously as Demna (/dɛmnʌ/ dem-NAH) is a Georgian fashion designer. Since 2025, he has been the creative director of Gucci. Prior to Gucci, for a decade he was the creative director of Balenciaga and the co-founder of Vetements.

== Early life and education ==
Demna was born in Georgia in 1981. During the War in Abkhazia, 10-year-old Demna and his family had to flee Sukhumi during an ethnic cleansing by separatist forces, who destroyed his home in a bombing. Demna and his family undertook a journey through the Caucasus Mountains, eventually reaching the capital Tbilisi where they took refuge. The family subsequently also lived in Ukraine and Moscow. During his teenage years, Demna experienced bullying as a gay youth in a “very religious, very macho” country. Demna and his parents relocated to Düsseldorf, Germany, in 2001. Demna, who spoke German, served as the family’s intermediary. His experience navigating a "hardcore" bureaucracy heightened his interest in “sociological uniforms,” which include jackets, caps, armbands, boots, badges, and patches used by individuals to indicate authority within a group.

Demna studied international economics for four years at Tbilisi State University and later attended the Royal Academy of Fine Arts in Antwerp, where he graduated with a master's degree in Fashion Design in 2006. After graduating, Demna relocated to Paris, where he said that he was just “some Georgian weird guy” with no established connections or network, as he had not participated in fashion events. Though he has not returned to Georgia, Demna has stated that "he feels deeply connected to Georgian culture, which he often incorporates into his work".

== Career ==
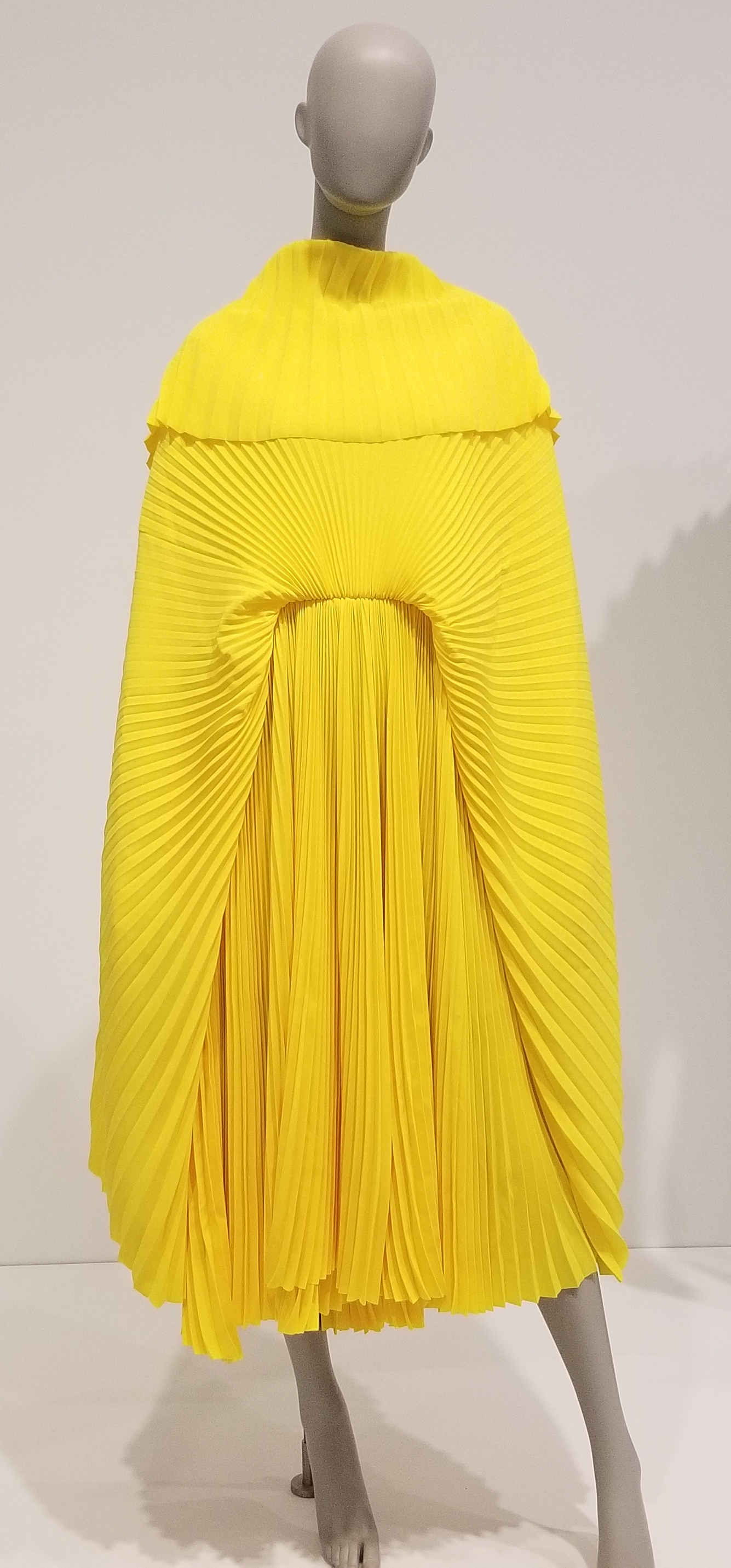
A dress by Demna, 2023

In 2006, Demna collaborated with Walter van Beirendonck on his men’s collections.

In 2009, Demna opened a showroom in Antwerp with Yuima Nakazato and Mikio Sakabe. Demna joined Maison Martin Margiela, where he was responsible for women’s collections until 2013. In 2013, he was appointed senior designer of women’s ready-to-wear collections at Louis Vuitton, initially under Marc Jacobs and briefly under Nicolas Ghesquière.

Together with his brother Guram Gvasalia, Demna launched the brand Vetements in 2014, along with a small group of anonymous friends, displaying their work in small gay clubs in Paris. Demna has said that his original purpose with the brand was to subvert the high fashion status quo. Vetements’ first women’s ready-to-wear collection was presented at Paris Fashion Week in 2014. The brothers were nominated for the LVMH’s Young Fashion Designer Prize after producing 3 collections.

In 2015, Demna became the creative director of Balenciaga, succeeding Alexander Wang. During Demna's ten year tenure at Balenciaga, revenues grew close to $2 billion from an estimated $390 million.

In 2019, Demna departed Vetements to pursue new artistic ventures, having accomplished his goals with the company, telling Highsnobiety that he had "accomplished [his] mission of a conceptualist and design innovator."

In January 2020, it was announced that Demna will revive Balenciaga's haute couture operation, establishing a dedicated team at the house's historic salon at 10 Avenue George V. His debut, originally scheduled for July 2020, was postponed because of the COVID-19 pandemic. On 7 July 2021, he presented Balenciaga's 50th couture collection, marking the house's return to couture after Cristóbal Balenciaga closed his atelier in 1968.

In August 2021, Demna collaborated with Kanye West, acting as the creative director for West’s second and third Donda album listening event, held at Mercedes-Benz Stadium.

At the 2021 Met Gala at New York City's Metropolitan Museum of Art, Demna walked the stairs with reality television star Kim Kardashian, both in his head-to-toe body feature obscuring Black Balenciaga designs completely masked, with Vogue offering that events rules had been rewritten.

In October 2021, Kim Kardashian wore Demna's custom designs for Balenciaga during her hosting debut on Saturday Night Live. She also wore his designs to rehearsals and cast dinners in the days preceding the broadcast.

In December 2022, Demna apologized after Balenciaga ran an ad campaign featuring six children holding teddy bears, which were dressed in BDSM gear, amidst empty wine glasses and champagne flutes. In his February 2023 interview with Vogue, Demna stated that the ad campaign “unfortunately was the wrong idea and a bad decision from me”, subsequently telling The New Yorker that “I didn’t see the creepy part of it. But it’s obvious now.”

In March 2025, he was announced as the next creative director of Gucci, succeeding Sabato De Sarno.

In September 2025, he unveiled his first designs for the house in La Famiglia, a spring/summer 2026 collection presented through a lookbook and The Tiger, a short film directed by Spike Jonze and Halina Reijn. The collection revisited Gucci's established design codes and referenced several periods in the house's history. Demna presented his first Gucci runway collection, for fall/winter 2026, at Milan's Palazzo delle Scintille in February 2026.

In May 2026, he presented his first cruise collection for Gucci in Times Square, New York City, using its digital billboards as part of the presentation. The production was reported to have cost approximately US$10 million, placing it in the same cost range as some of the most expensive fashion shows staged.

In August 2026, Demna dressed Cristiano Ronaldo and Georgina Rodríguez in custom Gucci designs for their civil wedding in Cascais, Portugal.

In November 2026, Demna served as creative director for Gucci's holiday campaign, which starred Mariah Carey in a short film directed by Harmony Korine. Set in a hotel preparing for Carey's arrival, the film featured her song "All I Want for Christmas Is You".

== Style ==
Demna's designs combine everyday clothing with exaggerated proportions and use of deconstruction, that started during his experience at Maison Margiela. At Balenciaga, he applied this approach to the house's archival silhouettes, translating the volumes of Cristóbal Balenciaga's couture coats into oversized bomber jackets. His use of volume is also autobiographical: as a child, he wore hand-me-downs and clothing bought in larger sizes so that it would last longer.

During his career, he often transformed objects and commercial imagery into luxury products, including Vetements' DHL-logo T-shirts and Balenciaga's leather interpretations of shopping bags and garbage bags. In Le Monde, Sophie Abriat connected these designs to an ironic examination of how fashion assigns value to ordinary objects. She also described the combination of streetwear, grunge and music-subculture references with couture craftsmanship, noting that deliberately distressed finishes could require substantial technical work.

== Fashion presentations ==
Demna's work included experiments with digital media and alternatives to conventional runway shows. In October 2020, he presented the label's 2021 pre-collection through a music video filmed on the streets of Paris at night, featuring models lip-syncing to "Sunglasses at Night". The autumn 2021 collection was subsequently presented through Afterworld: The Age of Tomorrow, a video game set in 2031 featuring digital avatars wearing the collection. Reviewing the project, Sarah Mower described Balenciaga under Demna as a fashion house operating across physical and digital media.

For the spring/summer 2022 presentation, Demna turned arrivals on a red carpet into the fashion show itself, with celebrities and members of the Balenciaga studio appearing before an audience watching a livestream inside the Théâtre du Châtelet. The event concluded with a screening of The Simpsons Balenciaga, an animated short depicting Springfield residents modelling the house's clothing. Vogue critic Nicole Phelps highlighted the presentation as an example of experimentation with the runway format and the use of humour in fashion.

His runway productions also used immersive environments to address social and environmental themes. In 2019, Gvasalia presented Vetements' spring/summer 2020 collection at a McDonald's restaurant on the Champs-Élysées in Paris. The show featured altered corporate logos and show notes printed on McDonald's napkins. Reviewing the collection for Vogue, Sarah Mower interpreted its use of corporate imagery as a critique of late-stage capitalism. His Balenciaga autumn/winter 2022 show placed models inside an artificial snowstorm enclosed by glass. Initially conceived as a reflection on climate change, the staging acquired additional significance following Russia's invasion of Ukraine; Demna connected it to his own experience of displacement from Georgia. For spring/summer 2023, models walked through a mud-covered set staged by artist Santiago Sierra, accompanied by a scent of decomposition created by Sissel Tolaas. Phelps interpreted the presentation as a response to contemporary political and social crises.

== Notable designs ==
=== Triple S sneaker ===
Introduced in Balenciaga's autumn/winter 2017 collection under Demna, the Triple S sneaker featured oversized, triple-stacked soles and deliberately distressed detailing. It helped popularise the chunky "dad sneaker" trend, influencing subsequent designs across the industry. In 2018, it ranked first in Lyst's list of the year's most popular sneakers, based on searches, sales and page views across online retailers.

== Humanitarian work ==
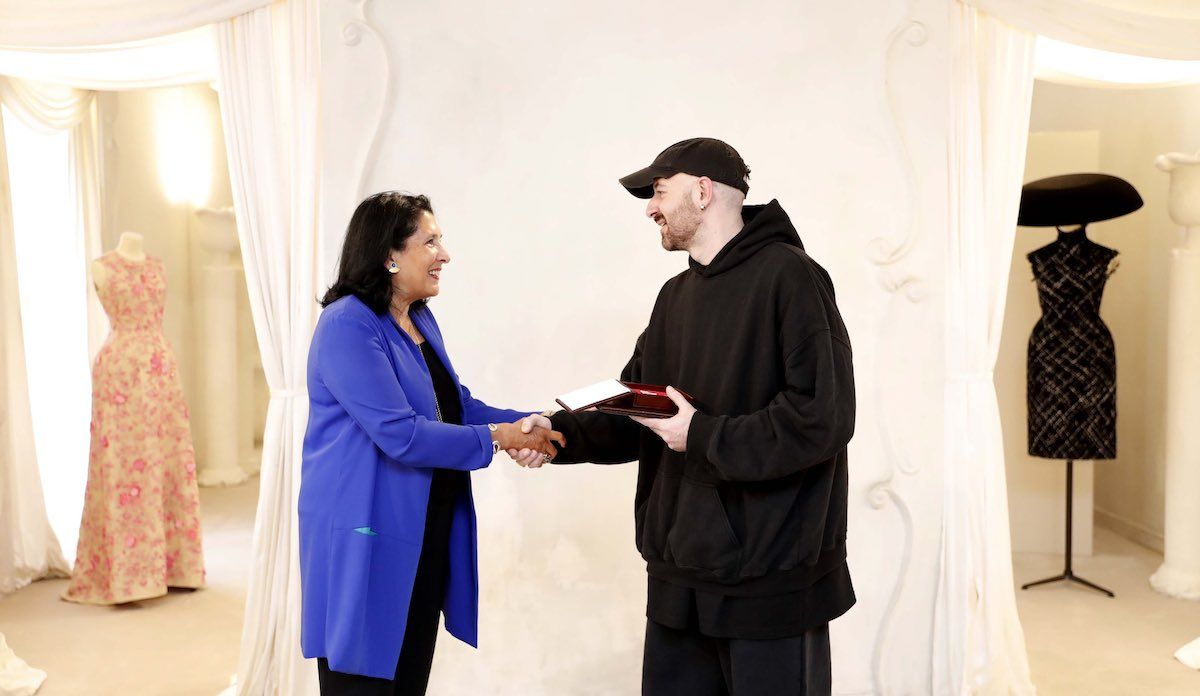
President of Georgia Salome Zourabichvili awarding Demna with the Order of Honor, symbolically given on the anniversary of the fall of Sokhumi.

Demna has used his creative work to raise awareness of war crimes committed against Georgians, dedicating one of his Vetements' collections to this theme and featuring a downloadable application linking users to information on Georgia's struggles.

In 2018, he launched Balenciaga's collaboration with the United Nations World Food Programme (WFP). The partnership aimed to raise funds and draw attention to the recent spike in global hunger.

Following the Russian invasion of Ukraine, Demna expressed support for Ukraine and became an ambassador of United24, a fundraising platform initiated by the Ukrainian President Volodymyr Zelenskyy.

== Awards and honours ==
- 2016 – The Fashion Awards: International Ready-to-Wear Designer, for Balenciaga, and International Urban Luxury Brand, for Vetements.
- 2017 – CFDA Fashion Awards: International Award, recognizing his work at Vetements and Balenciaga.
- 2018 – The Fashion Awards: Accessories Designer of the Year, for Balenciaga.
- 2019 – Pratt Institute: Creative Spirit Award.
- 2021 – CFDA Fashion Awards: International Women's Designer of the Year, for Balenciaga.
- 2021 – Order of Honor: Awarded by Georgian President Salome Zourabichvili in recognition of his achievements in fashion and contributions to promoting Georgia internationally.
- 2022 – Time 100: Included in Time magazine's annual list of the 100 most influential people in the world.
- 2025 – Ordre des Arts et des Lettres: Appointed Chevalier (Knight) by French Minister of Culture Rachida Dati, in recognition of his contributions to fashion.

== Influence ==
Fashion critics have credited Gvasalia with influencing wider trends in contemporary fashion through his work at Vetements and Balenciaga. In 2016, Sarah Mower documented in Vogue the rapid spread of Vetements' influence, citing the label's widened shoulders, elongated sleeves and asymmetrical hoodies.

Writing in GQ in 2025, Samuel Hine identified Gvasalia as a leading figure in the broader adoption of oversized clothing and bulky trainers, and described his architectural tailoring at Balenciaga as a turning point in contemporary menswear. Hine also credited his widely circulated designs and theatrical fashion presentations with contributing to menswear's growing mainstream visibility.

== See also ==
- David Koma, Georgian fashion designer, former creative director of Mugler
