= Linda Loppa =

Belgian fashion designer and fashion consultant

- Born: June 26, 1948 (age 78); Antwerp, Belgium
- Occupation: Fashion designer
- Title: Director of Polimoda (2007–2016); Director of Fashion, Royal Academy of Fine Arts (1985–2006)

Linda Loppa is a Belgian fashion designer and fashion consultant. For nine years, she served as the director of Polimoda in Florence, Italy and is now its strategy and vision advisor.

Loppa is known for her role in the development of fashion in Belgium. Prior to working at Polimoda, she served as the director of the fashion department at the Royal Academy of Fine Arts and simultaneously as the director and curator of ModeMuseum Antwerpen. She is also a cofounder of the Flanders Fashion Institute.

== Early life and education ==
Loppa was born in Antwerp on June 26, 1948. Her father, Renzo Loppa, was a tailor. She initially wanted to be an architect, but instead she studied fashion for four years at the Royal Academy of Fine Arts in Antwerp graduating in 1971.

== Early career ==
After completing her studies at the Royal Academy, Loppa worked at Bartsons, a Belgian raincoat manufacturer. She started Loppa, a retail business in 1978 where she was one of the first to sell marques such as Gianni Versace, Claude Montana, Helmut Lang, and Comme des Garçons in Belgium.

== Fashion education ==
Loppa began teaching fashion at the Royal Academy of Fine Arts of Antwerp in the early 1980s. She became head of the Academy's fashion department in 1985, a role which she would hold for over 25 years.

Graduates of the Academy while she was its head included Veronique Branquinho, Haider Ackermann, Kris Van Assche, and Demna Gvasalia. Loppa played a role in Raf Simons' career by having him learn the basic principles of tailoring from her father.

While head of the fashion department at the Royal Academy, Loppa was a cofounder of Mode Antwerpen. Founded in 1996, it was a predecessor of what would eventually develop into the Flanders Fashion Institute. In 1998, she was appointed the director of what would become ModeMuseum Antwerpen serving as its first director and curator.

Loppa left Antwerp in 2007, moving to Florence to take over the directorship of Polimoda. She held the position until 2016 when she moved to Paris but continues to work with Polimoda as the director of the university's Strategy & Vision Platform and as a consultant.

Linda Loppa is active as a consultant, curator and lecturer on fashion, art and the in-between.

In 2019, she published Life is a Vortex ISBN 978-88-572-4062-6 which British Vogue described as "revealing her unique way of decoding the business of fashion." The book was published at the request and with the support of Polimoda. She also published the book THE NEW FASHION CONTAINER PROJECT. ISBN 978-3-9504985-1-6

== Recognition ==
Loppa has been described as the First Lady of Antwerp fashion. She is included in the Business of Fashion 500 Hall of Fame since 2014. She holds an honorary doctorate from University of the Arts London and was nominated by Time as one of the 25 most influential people in the fashion world. She has served on the panel for the LVMH Young Designer Fashion Prize.
