= Bárbara Sánchez =

Bárbara Sánchez may be:

- Bárbara Sánchez (Ecuadorian footballer), born 1987
- Bárbara Sánchez (Venezuelan footballer), born 1990
- Bárbara Sánchez-Kane, Mexican fashion designer
- Bárbara Rebolledo Sánchez, Chilean television presenter
