= Thuillier Paris =

- Industry: Mode
- Founded: 1930
- Founder: Robert Thuillier
- Headquarters: Paris, France
- Products: Shirts
- Owner: Mathias Vandaele

Thuillier Paris, formerly known as Thuillier Chemisier, is a French fashion house created by the master shirtmaker Robert Thuillier in 1930. Also dubbed the "shirtmaker of Presidents", thanks to its several years serving at the Elysee Palace, this house has been fully active for two generations before being temporarily closed for a period of 13 years. In 2022, a French tailor decided to buy the inactive brand from the heirs.

== Robert Thuillier ==
Robert Thuillier was born in Paris in 1894. From the age of six, he was raised by his mother; she worked for Parisian couturiers, in particular doing hems of shirts. Thuillier accompanied his mother to work and helped her with different tasks. He drew the attention of a master shirtmaker who decided to take the young Thuillier under his wing and taught him to become a master shirtmaker. Robert mastered the techniques of designing shirts, and was hired by the luxury house Amos Sulka & Company. He was a cutter in this house before he was called up for World War I.

After World War I, Thuillier resumed his position at Amos Sulka & Company where he quickly rose through the ranks until he became responsible for the whole team of cutters in the Parisian workshops. During this time, he trained a large number of cutters of the next generation.

In 1930, Thuillier left Amos Sulka & Company to set up his own business, Thuillier Chemisier. He opened his first boutique on rue de Marignan, in the 8th arrondissement of Paris. This was a prestigious location, and Thuillier knew that it could help him draw the attention of a demanding clientele, accustomed to high-quality designs.

In the boutique, he was assisted not only by his sons, Jacques, René and André, but also by his wife Gabrielle, who was trained in dressmaking. In those days, the family worked in the workshop located in the back room of the store. In 1938, following several years of activity and after receiving his new certificate of "chemisier créateur", Robert Thuillier decided to move out and chose a more discrete location. His new boutique was located on the upper floor of a building at 21 rue Galilée in the 8th arrondissement.

The years following World War II were challenging for Thuillier Chemisier. In the 1950s, Thuillier dismissed personnel, including his sons Jacques and René. His sons ultimately found work at Korrigan, before being employed by Lacoste. Some years later, André was laid off as well, and went to work at Washington Tremlett, another shirtmaker where he had served as cutter for three years.

At the beginning of the 1960s, Thuillier entrusted the management of the business to his son André. Thuillier died in 1969.

== Three brothers ==
=== Rue Marbeuf ===
André made major changes to the fashion house at the beginning of the 1960s. Along with his brothers, he established the boutique in a prestigious Parisian district, 9 rue Marbeuf, the famous "street of the shirtmakers", which runs through the heart of the 8th arrondissement.

In the 1960s, during the post-war boom period of the "Trente Glorieuses", Thuillier's workshop reached its maximum production capacity. The family entrusted the task of shirts' assembly to another workshop in Palluau-sur-Indre, in order to meet an increasing demand, while maintaining the steps of cutting and patterning in the family workshop on rue Marbeuf.

=== The shirtmaker of presidents ===
When Valéry Giscard d'Estaing was elected President of France in 1974, he appointed André Thuillier to tailor his shirts. In 1981, François Mitterrand succeeded d'Estaing, and used the same shirtmarker as his predecessor. During his two terms in office, more than 195 traditional shirts, 30 nightshirts and 30 dress shirts, were specially designed for Mitterrand, several of which have been sold at auctions organized in his honour.)

In 1996, the newly elected President Jacques Chirac received the President of South Africa, Nelson Mandela. As a welcome gift, he offered him a bespoke shirt designed by the Thuillier family.

It was by serving three presidents that Thuillier became known as "the shirtmaker of Presidents".

== Relaunch of the Thuillier brand I ==
In 1998, the Thuillier family retired and decided to put an end to shirt making. More than a decade passed before Didier Thuillier (son of René and Huguette Thuillier) considered relaunching the brand. The premature death of Huguette Thuiller, who had always regretted the decision to stop the activity, encouraged him to register the trademark "Thuillier Chemisier" at the National Institute of Industrial Property in 2011.

In 2014, Didier Thuillier and his son Franck established a partnership with entrepreneur Chadi Srour. Srour and Franck Thuillier have taken over the management of the company, under the trademark Thuillier Paris. They continue to work with historic suppliers, in Palluau-sur-Indre for the shirts and in Paris for the handmade ties.

For the first time in its history in 2017, Thuillier Paris has been exported to overseas markets.

For his state visit to the United States in April 2018, the French President Emmanuel Macron has been sporting French finery, wearing ties and shirts from Thuillier Paris. For the White House gala, Macron wore a cotton poplin plastron shirt which took 11 hours to make.

== Relaunch of the Thuillier brand II ==
It was in 2016 that Mathias Vandaele first heard about the Thuillier house and its history. But it was not until 2022, while he was still working at Charvet, that he had the opportunity to acquire the Thuillier Paris brand. The family wanted 1 Euro, but sold for much more than this. It is currently active and ready to take order https://thuillierparis.com/en
