= Kris Van Assche =

Belgian fashion designer (born 1976)

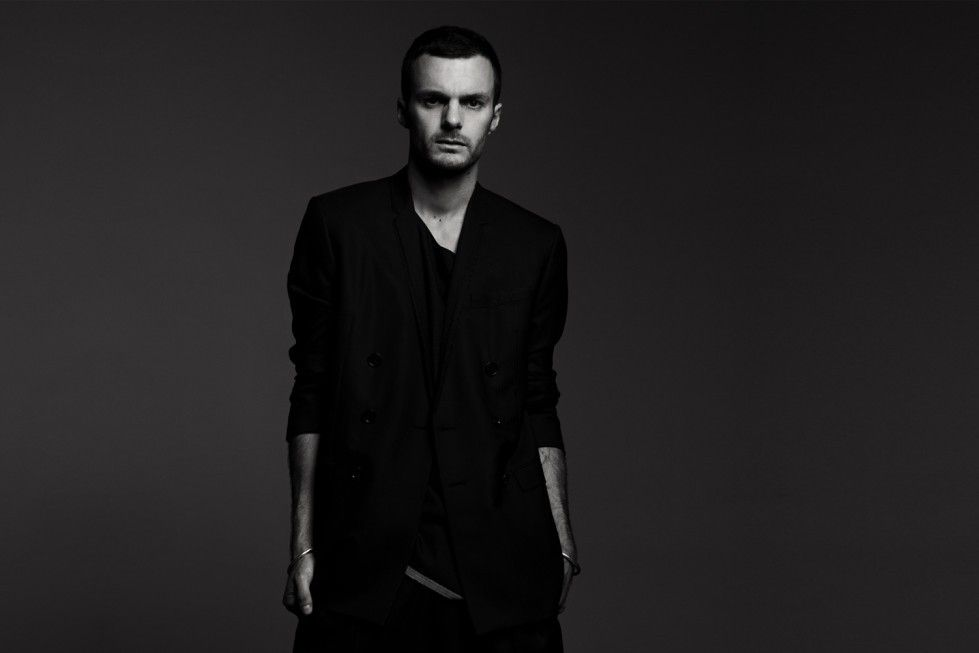
- Born: 12 May 1976 (age 50); Londerzeel, Belgium
- Education: Koninklijke Academie voor Schone Kunsten Antwerpen, Fashion and Design
- Labels: KRISVANASSCHE; Dior Homme; Berluti

Kris Van Assche (born 12 May 1976) is a Belgian fashion designer. He was the creative director of Berluti (2018-2021), a luxury leather brand owned by LVMH, and artistic director for Dior Homme from 2007 to 2018.

== Early life and education ==
Van Assche grew up an only child in Londerzeel, in Belgium’s Flemish-speaking region, between Antwerp and Brussels. He studied women’s wear at the Antwerp Royal Academy of Fine Arts from 1994 to 1998.

== Career ==
=== Early career ===
After graduating Van Assche moved to Paris in 1998. He was immediately appointed at Yves Saint Laurent as Hedi Slimane's first assistant for the Rive Gauche Homme line.

The collaboration with Slimane continued at Christian Dior for the launching and development of the Dior Homme collection until September 2004. In January 2005, Van Assche finally presented his own men's collection for the first time in Paris during Men's Fashion Week.

=== KRISVANASSCHE, 2005–2015 ===
In addition to his work at Dior, Van Assche founded his own label in 2005. In June 2013, he opened the first KRISVANASSCHE boutique in Paris. Designed by Ciguë, it was located in the 1st arrondissement, at 16 rue Saint Roch.

In 2012 and 2013, KRISVANASSCHE teamed up with American denim brand Lee to produce two capsule collections.

In late May 2015, after several years of collections often judged as irrelevant by the critics and a style outdated by the new Londoner designers (such as JW Anderson or Christopher Shannon), Van Assche announced that he was closing his personal label for the time being, due to the difficulties of being an independent label.

=== Dior Homme, 2007–2018 ===
Van Assche subsequently served as the artistic director for Dior Homme from April 2007 to March 2018.

=== Berluti, 2018–2021 ===
In April 2018, Van Assche was confirmed as the new creative director at luxury brand Berluti, another LVMH company, following the departure of Haider Ackermann. His debut Berluti collection was released January 2019.

For the 2019 Design Miami fair, Van Assche joined forces with art dealer François Laffanour to present a collection of 17 original Pierre Jeanneret furniture pieces, restored by Laffanour and upholstered with Berluti's emblematic Venezia leather.

On 21 April 2021, Kris Van Assche announced on his Instagram that his departure from the brand as its artistic director. He also said that during 3 years time in Berluti had been extremely intense especially in COVID-19 pandemic period.

=== Later career ===
In 2021, Van Assche became a mentor of the Master in Creative Direction at Polimoda fashion school in Florence, Italy.

In 2022, Van Assche created a collection for Chinese kidswear company Balabala, with products for girls and boys ages three to 14.

== Style ==
Van Assche's style icons are Jean Cocteau, for his classic coats and eccentric manner; Pina Bausch, who wore boots for dancing; and Sean Penn and Johnny Depp.

== Personal life ==
Van Assche lives in Paris and has two Siamese cats, named Frida (born in 2013) and Diego after Frida Kahlo and Diego Rivera. He speaks fluent French, Dutch and English.
