= Berluti =

French luxury menswear house

- Company type: Subsidiary
- Industry: Fashion
- Founded: 1895; 131 years ago
- Founder: Alessandro Berluti
- Headquarters: Paris, France
- Number of locations: 77 stores worldwide (2025)
- Products: Shoes, boots, leatherware
- Parent: LVMH
- Website: www.berluti.com

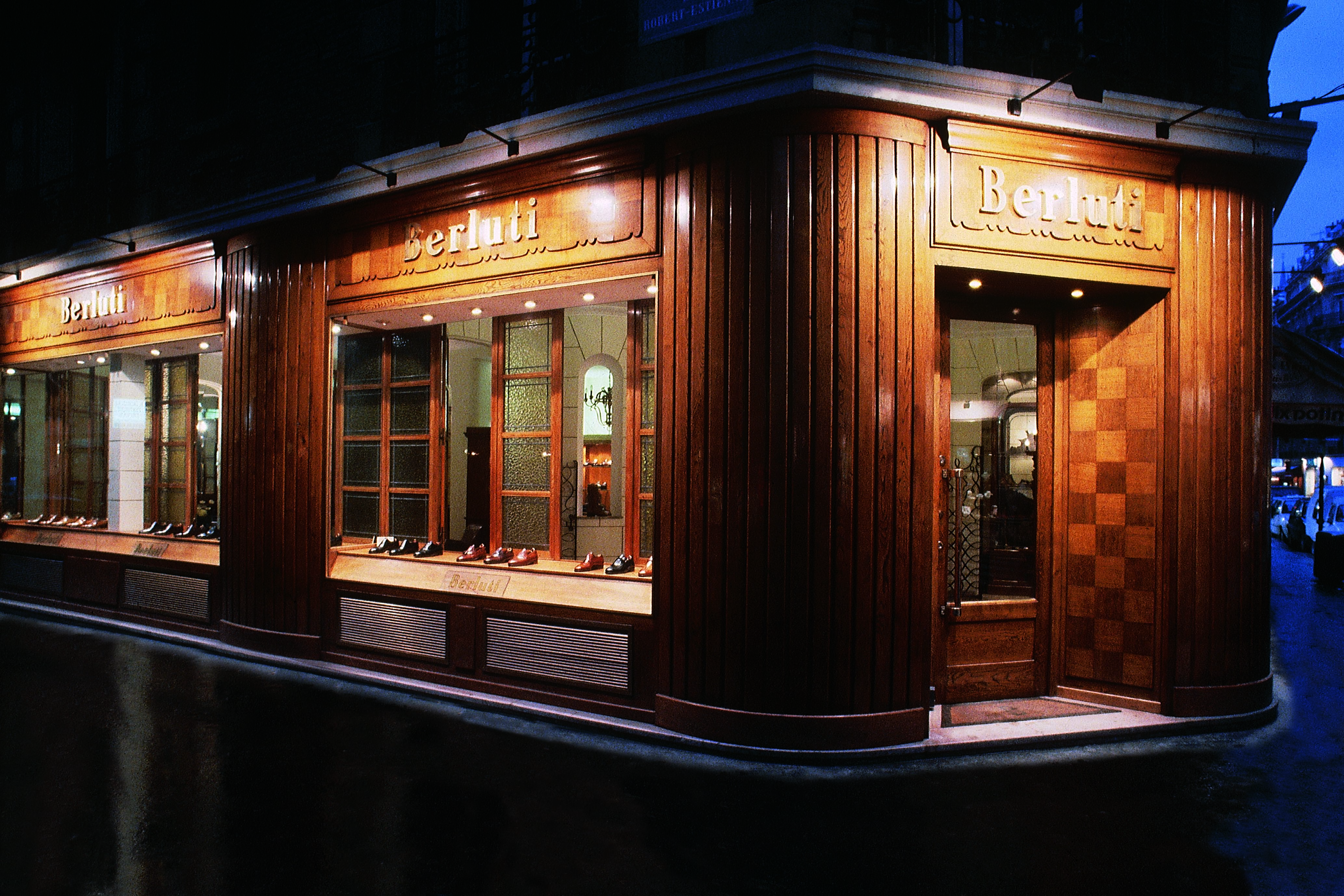
Berluti original store on rue Marbeuf in the 8th arrondissement of Paris

Berluti is a French leather maker that manufactures menswear, especially the leather finishing of calfskin, kangaroo leather and alligator skin in its production of shoes and boots. It makes leather belts, bags, and wallets, as well as bespoke and ready-to-wear garments. Established in 1895 by Italian Alessandro Berluti of Marche, Berluti is based in Paris on rue Marbeuf. The brand was bought by LVMH in 1993.

In 2023, the brand returned to Paris Fashion Week despite operating without a creative director. The role was most recently held by Kris Van Assche from 2018 to 2021.

== History ==
Logo until 2018

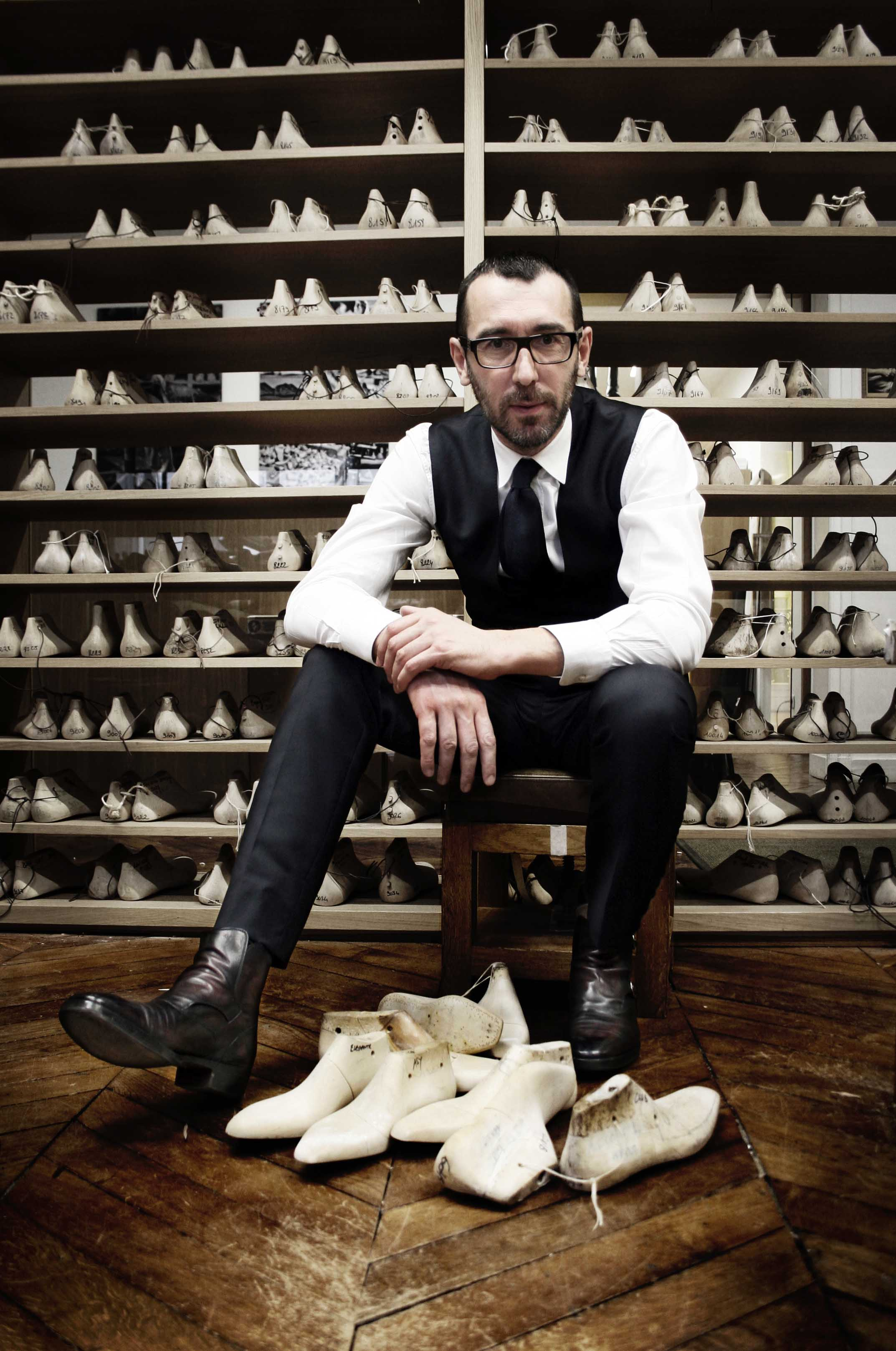
Alessandro Sartori was Berluti's creative director for 5 years, overseeing its first clothing collections

Berluti was founded in 1895 by Italian Alessandro Berluti, and later run by Olga Squeri, also known as Olga Berluti. The LVMH group acquired Berluti in 1993. In 2012, Berluti acquired Paris tailor house Arnys and launched its first prêt-à-porter menswear collections.

In 2011, Olga Berluti was named creative director of the Berluti Art line.

From 2011 to 2023, Berluti was headed by LVMH's CEO Bernard Arnault's son, Antoine Arnault, who also serves as the chairman of Loro Piana. In March 2014, Isabella Capece Galeota became director of image and communications.

Between 2011 and 2014, Berluti increased its annual revenue from less than 30 million euros ($32.6 million) to €100 million ($109 million), having expanded its product offering, bought a custom atelier and increased its global store network to 46 boutiques.

In 2013, Berluti worked with Dutch artist Maarten Baas on created a series of sculptures.

In 2017, Berluti introduced a sunglass collection in collaboration with Oliver Peoples.

In 2018, creative director Kris Van Assche reconfigured the existing Berluti logo based on one he found carved into a shoe last and devised with M/M Paris.

All the footwear manufacturing and leather goods are produced in the town of Gaibanella in the municipality of Ferrara, while Paris is the location of the corporate headquarters.

Berluti designed uniforms for the French team at the opening ceremony of the 2024 Olympics and Paralympics in France.

== Creative directors ==
- 2011–2016: Alessandro Sartori
- 2016–2018: Haider Ackermann
- 2018–2021: Kris Van Assche

== Recognition ==
In 2017 Business of Fashion named Berluti among the 16 best companies to work for in the fashion industry.
