= Samu-Jussi Koski =

Finnish fashion designer (born 1975)

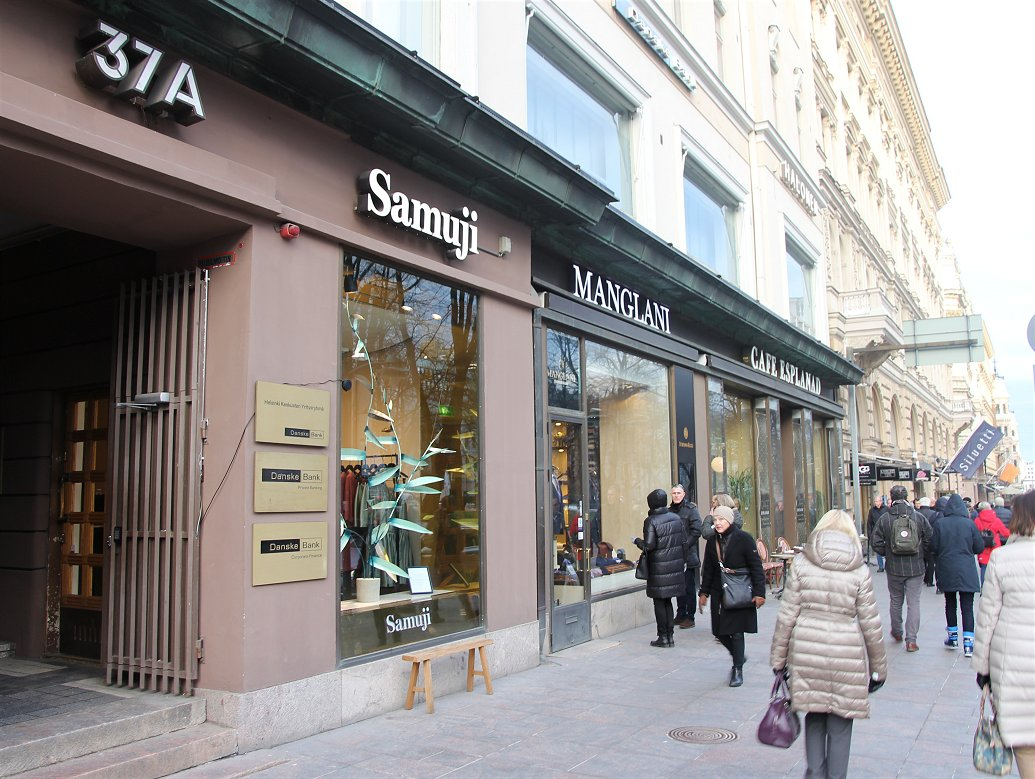
Samuji’s store, Pohjoisesplanadi, Helsinki.

Samu-Jussi Koski (born 3 June 1975 in Helsinki) is a Finnish fashion designer and the founder and Creative Director of Samuji.

Koski holds a Bachelor’s Degree in Fashion Design from the Lahti University of Applied Sciences in Finland, and a Master’s Degree in Fashion Design from the Polimoda Fashion School in Florence, Italy.

Before establishing his own label, Koski worked the major part of his career at the Finnish textile house Marimekko, where he started as an Assistant Designer in 2003. Two years later Koski was promoted to Fashion Designer and he began to design collections carrying his own name under the Marimekko brand.

The working experience was significant for the young designer and allowed Koski to develop his own signature style early in his career. Koski’s vision was well received, and in 2008 he became the Creative Director of the company.

In 2009, Koski moved on to start Samuji with the ambition to pursue a variety of creative projects. He began on his own but soon gathered a team of creative minds to help him with art direction, production, marketing, sales and finance. The first Samuji womenswear collection was launched in spring 2011.

Koski received the Fashion Gloria Award from Gloria magazine in 2008 and the Newcomer of the Year award at the Elle Style Awards in 2010. In 2012, the Samuji brand received the Golden Clothing Tree award.

Samuji was sold to the Nosh clothing brand in 2021. In 2022, Koski founded the creative consultancy S & Co, as well as the bag and accessories brand Borse e Cose and the casual clothing brand Jeans & Towels. In spring 2025, the Samuji company owned by Nosh filed for bankruptcy, and Koski announced the closure of Borse e Cose and Jeans & Towels.

Today, the company’s key areas are design and consulting. Samuji presents four womenswear collections annually, and a menswear line was introduced in fall 2013.

== Personal life ==
Koski's spouse is journalist Ville Blåfield.

Between 2003 and 2006, Koski played the character Timppa in the Sartsa ja Timppa sketches of the television programme Summeri.
