= Sheila Bridges =

American interior designer

Sheila Bridges (born 1963/1964) is an American interior designer who founded her own firm, Sheila Bridges Design, Inc., in 1994.

== Early life and education ==
Originally from Philadelphia, Pennsylvania where she graduated from Friends' Central School in Wynnewood, PA, Bridges moved to New York City in 1986. She holds degrees from Brown University and Parsons School of Design, and studied decorative arts at Polimoda in Florence, Italy.

== Career ==
Named "America's Best Interior Designer" by CNN and Time magazine, Bridges has designed residences and offices for prominent entertainers, entrepreneurs, and business professionals, including the Harlem offices for former President Bill Clinton and his staff, and the official vice president's residence for Kamala Harris and Doug Emhoff. Her design firm has also completed projects for rooms at Columbia University and Princeton University.

Sheila Bridges Design, Inc has been included in Gotham and New York magazine's top interior designers lists and has been featured in House Beautiful magazine's listing of the Top 100 Interior Designers in the country since 1997.

Bridges is the author of Furnishing Forward: A Practical Guide to Furnishing for a Lifetime, released in 2002. Her memoir, The Bald Mermaid, was published in 2013 and chronicles her childhood, professional life, and her diagnosis of alopecia. In 2022, the book was optioned by Southern Fried Filmworks for adaptation into a series.

Bridges hosted four seasons of Sheila Bridges: Designer Living, a weekly series for the Fine Living Network. She has been a regular contributor on NBC's Today Show, has appeared on The Oprah Winfrey Show, and has been profiled in numerous national and international publications including The New York Times, The Wall Street Journal, O, The Oprah Magazine, Martha Stewart Living, Ebony, Country Living, Elle Décor, Interior Design, Vanity Fair, InStyle, Essence, House & Garden, Town & Country, Traditional Home and Black Enterprise.

In 2007, Bridges began designing furniture and home furnishings under the name Sheila Bridges Home, Inc. Her home furnishing collections have been sold online, through catalogs and at national retailers Anthropologie and Bed, Bath & Beyond. Bridges' Harlem Toile De Jouy wallpaper is currently available through design showrooms in The United States, Canada and Europe and is represented in the Smithsonian Cooper-Hewitt National Design Museum's permanent wallpaper collection.

== Personal life ==
Bridges has homes in Harlem and near Hudson, New York, and in Reykjavík, Iceland.

== Honors and recognition ==
- 2022: Architectural Digest 100 list
- 2023: Forbes 50 over 50 list
