= Meagan Cignoli =

American photographer and filmmaker

- Born: Suffolk County, New York
- Occupations: Photographer; filmmaker; businessperson
- Known for: Creative director of Visual Country
- Website: visualcountry.com

Meagan Cignoli is an American photographer, filmmaker, and businessperson who is the founder and creative director of Visual Country, a video production agency. Cignoli was a Vine personality, accumulating around 750,000 followers before the platform was shut down. She was known for her stop-motion videos, and created ad campaigns in that style for brands like Lowe's, GE, and eBay.

== Early life and education ==
Cignoli was born and raised in Suffolk County, New York. When she turned 18, she started traveling around the world to locales like Thailand and India. In 1999, she moved to New York City to study fashion design at the Fashion Institute of Technology. She studied photography at the School of Visual Arts and the International Center of Photography. She later studied fine arts at Polimoda in Italy and Spanish at the University of Havana in Cuba. After a year in Cuba, she began studying French.

== Career ==
Cignoli began her career as a freelance photographer, working in fashion, advertising, and portraiture. She first gained a following largely through her stop-motion videos on the six-second video-hosting platform, Vine, in early 2013. Two of her videos were finalists in the "#6secfilms Vine contest" at the Tribeca Film Festival that year. One of her first prominent projects came in May 2013 when she partnered with BBDO and Lowe's on the latter's "Fix in Six" ad campaign on Vine. The campaign featured a series of stop-motion videos depicting six-second home improvement tips. Cignoli also became involved with marketing aspects of numerous other brands, including Nike, HBO, BMW, YSL, and others. The Lowe's project earned Cignoli numerous awards including a Bronze Cyber Lion at the Cannes Film Festival and a Silver Clio.

In 2014, she co-founded her own video production agency, Visual Country, with partner Amber Lee. The company focuses primarily on short-form video marketing on platforms like Vine, Instagram, Snapchat, and YouTube. At the time of Vine's shuttering the following year, she had nearly 750,000. In November 2016, Cignoli produced a film about the history of millinery entitled The Milliner in conjunction with Visual Country and the Savannah College of Art and Design FASH Museum of Fashion and Film.

In 2017, Cignoli again worked with BBDO and Lowe's on an Instagram campaign. Over the course of the following years, she also oversaw hundreds of other projects in her role as creative director at Visual Country, including campaigns for Google, Twitter, and Coca-Cola.
