= ModeMuseum Antwerpen =

Fashion museum in Antwerp

Coordinates: 51°13′2.5″N 4°23′59.5″E

MoMu - Fashion Museum Antwerp; ModeMuseum Antwerpen; MoMu Antwerp
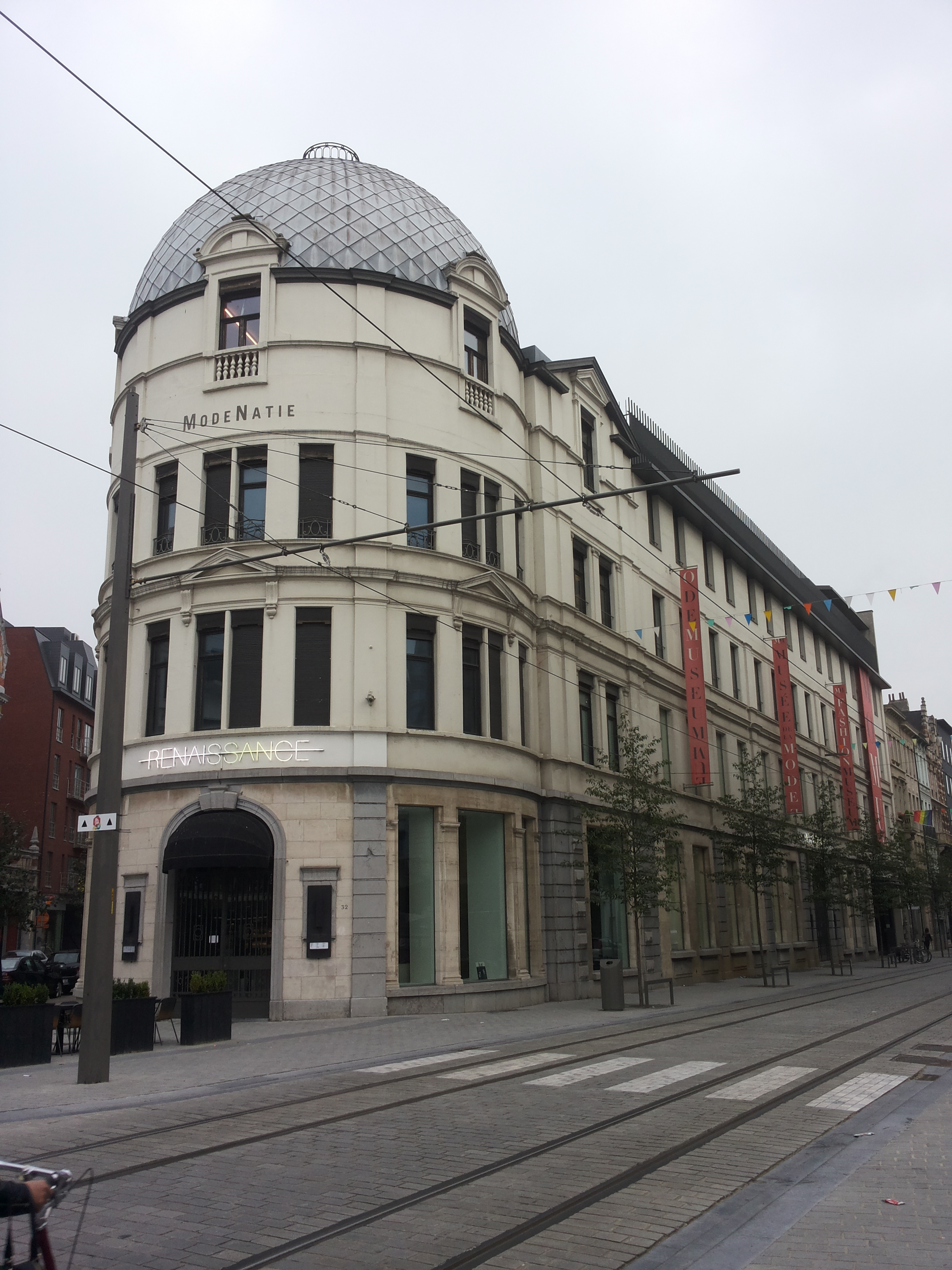
- The ModeNatie building, within which MoMu is situated.
- Established: September 2002
- Location: Antwerp
- Type: fashion museum
- Collection size: 25,000 item of collection or exhibition, 38,000 item of collection or exhibition
- Director: Kaat Debo
- Website: https://www.momu.be/

MoMu (Mode Museum) is the fashion museum of the City of Antwerp, Belgium and collects, conserves, studies and exhibits the largest collection of historical and contemporary designer fashion in Belgium, and holds the largest collection of Belgian fashion in the world. The museum focuses specifically on Belgian fashion designers and alumni of the Fashion Department due to the number of acclaimed designers who studied there during the 1980s and 1990s, including Martin Margiela and the Antwerp Six.

Since 2002, the museum has been located in the centre of Antwerp in the ModeNatie building on Nationalestraat. ModeNatie also houses Flanders District of Creativity, the Fashion Department of the Royal Academy of Fine Arts (Antwerp), and the Renaissance restaurant. Linda Loppa, MoMu's first director was also the founder and director of the Antwerp Fashion Department. MoMu's current director and chief curator is Kaat Debo. The museum is under the administration of Antwerp province.

== Architecture ==
The ModeNatie building dates back to the nineteenth century, where it housed the Hôtel Central and the clothing shop New England. It served various purposes throughout the twentieth century until 1997, when the building was assigned to Flanders Fashion Institute (now Flanders District of Creativity) by the City of Antwerp.

In 1999, Ghent-based architect Marie-José Van Hee was commissioned to renovate the building, and on September 21st 2002, MoMu officially opened its doors. From April 2018 to September 2021, the museum was closed for renovations by the architecture firm B-architecten, adding 800m² of public space while preserving Van Hee's original design.

== Collections ==
=== The MoMu Collection ===
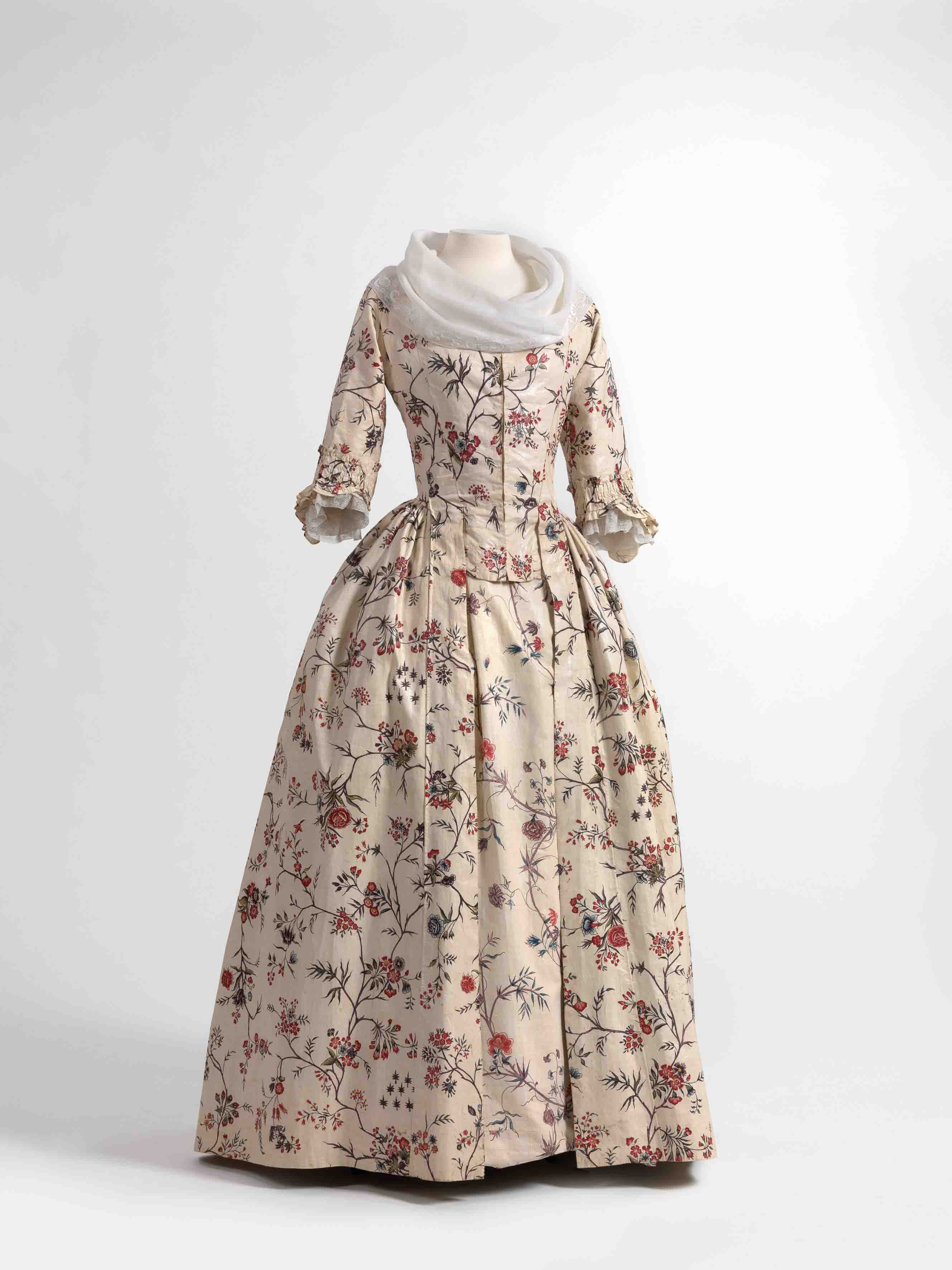
Robe à l'anglaise dress in chintz, ca. 1770-1790, shawl (fichu) in embroidered batiste, 1770-1800 - from the Jacoba de Jonge collection.

MoMu's collection contains over 40,000 items: clothing, accessories, and textiles, as well as more unexpected pieces such as tools and machines used in production. The collection is constantly growing with new acquisitions, loans, and donations from private individuals, designers, or fashion houses. These items are used for research, MoMu exhibitions, and international loans to other museums.

MoMu's historical collection began with 17,000 pieces from the former provincial Costume and Textile Museum Vrieselhof (Provinciale Kostuum- en Textielmuseum) in Oelegem. In 2011, this collection gained over 2000 18th-, 19th-, and early-20th-century objects from the private Dutch collector, Jacoba de Jonge.

Since 2011, MoMu's acquisition policy prioritises contemporary designer fashion. Sizable donations from Linda Loppa and Christine Matthijs initiated this part of the collection, which has since grown with donations from Dries Van Notenand Bernhard Willhelm among many others. MoMu also receives long-term loans to its collection, including from Walter Van Beirendonck, Stephen Jones, and Geert Bruloot and Eddy Michiels, the founders of the former shoe shop Coccodrillo.

Cache corset (ST647) from the MoMu Study Collection

=== Dries Van Noten Study Center and the MoMu Study Collection ===
Cache corset (ST647) being used in the MoMu Library Reading Room as part of a Pattern-a-thon event

The Dries Van Noten Study Center (DVNSC) supports research and educational activities, participating in national and international projects, hosting activities, and creating an accessible collection of garments and accessories - the Study Collection. This collection consists of over 2000 objects and is housed in the MoMu library for public consultation.

=== Library Collection ===
In addition to the fashion and costume collection, the museum also houses a vast library collection. The MoMu Library is an academic library for historical and contemporary fashion and textiles, with over 15,000 books, an archive of reference works and ephemera, hundreds of contemporary and historical magazines, and a digital database of images.

== Exhibitions ==
Since its opening, MoMu has organised a continuous programme of exhibitions. Centred around specific themes or designers, these exhibitions create a narrative of the cultural and historical significance of fashion. To achieve this, a designer's sources of inspiration, works from other disciplines, and many other forms of information are displayed alongside articles of clothing. MoMu works closely with designers and their teams to develop their exhibition concepts. MoMu's exhibitions have also travelled to Paris, Stockholm, London, Tokyo, Munich, Istanbul, Enschede and Melbourne.

After an extensive three-year renovation ending in September 2021, MoMu opened two new exhibition spaces; one to display its permanent collection, and a second temporary exhibition space.

=== Overview of past and present exhibitions. ===
Silhouette from A.F.Vandevorst A/W 2011-2012 on display during MoMu's Happy Birthday Dear Academie! exhibition in 2013

19th-century dresses and paintings on display during MoMu's Fashion and Interiors exhibition in 2025

In addition to the Permanent Collection display, which permanently rotates, MoMu hosts thematic temporary exhibitions, which can be seen in the following table, as well as on MoMu's online exhibition archive.

Exhibition	Start Date	End Date
Backstage: Selection I	21/09/2002	04/04/2003
Patterns	24/04/2003	10/08/2003
GenovanversaeviceversA	09/09/2003	28/03/2004
Goddess	08/05/2004	22/08/2004
Malign Muses	18/09/2004	30/01/2005
Beyond Desire	25/02/2005	18/08/2005
Katharina Prospekt: The Russians by A.F. Vandevorst	09/09/2005	05/02/2006
Yohji Yamamoto Dream Shop	07/03/2006	13/08/2006
The MoMu Collection: Selection II	08/09/2006	17/06/2007
6+ Antwerp Fashion	25/01/2007	23/06/2007
Bernhard Willhelm: Het Totaal Rappel	13/07/2007	10/02/2008
Moi, VERONIQUE BRANQUINHO TOuTe Nue	12/03/2008	17/08/2008
Maison Martin Margiela '20' The Exhibition	12/09/2008	08/02/2009
Paper Fashion!	06/03/2009	16/08/2009
Delvaux: 180 Years of Belgian Luxury	17/09/2009	21/02/2010
Black: Masters of Black in Fashion & Costume	17/09/2009	21/02/2010
Stephen Jones & The Accent of Fashion	08/09/2010	13/02/2011
Unravel: Knitwear in Fashion	16/03/2011	14/08/2011
Walter Van Beirendonck: Dream The World Awake	14/09/2011	19/02/2012
Living Fashion: Women's Daily Wear 1750–1950 from the Jacoba de Jonge Collection.	21/03/2012	12/08/2012
Madame Grès: Sculptural Fashion	12/09/2012	10/02/2013
Silks & Prints from the Abraham Archive: Couture in Colour	13/03/2013	11/08/2013
Happy Birthday Dear Academie!	08/09/2013	13/02/2014
Birds of Paradise: Plumes & Feathers in Fashion	20/03/2014	24/08/2014
MoMu Now: Contemporary Fashion from the MoMu Collection	25/09/2014	04/01/2015
Dries Van Noten: Inspirations	12/02/2015	19/07/2015
Footprint: The Tracks of Shoes in Fashion	03/09/2015	14/02/2016
Game Changers: Reinventing the 20th Century Silhouette	18/03/2016	14/08/2016
Rik Wouters & The Private Utopia	17/09/2016	26/02/2017
Margiela, The Hermès Years	31/03/2017	27/08/2017
Olivier Theyskens - She Walks in Beauty	12/10/2017	15/04/2018
Soft? Tactile Dialogues	28/09/2018	24/02/2019
Textile as Resistance: Billboards in the city	31/08/2020	21/09/2020
2021 RE-OPENING
E/MOTION. Fashion in Transition	04/09/2021	23/01/2022
P.LACE.S - Looking through Antwerp Lace	25/09/2021	09/01/2022
MIRROR MIRROR - Fashion & the Psyche	08/10/2022	05/02/2023
Exploding Fashion: From 2D to 3D to 3D Animation	08/10/2022	05/02/2023
Geometrically Wired. IO Van Oostveldt: Between Clothing and Art	25/02/2023	30/07/2023
Man Ray and Fashion	22/04/2023	13/08/2023
ECHO. Wrapped in Memory	14/10/2023	25/02/2024
Baloji Augurism.	21/10/2023	16/06/2024
WILLY VANDERPERRE prints, films, a rave and more...	27/04/2024	04/08/2024
MoMu x Fashion Department	29/06/2024	10/11/2024
Masquerade, Make-up & Ensor	28/09/2024	02/02/2025
JAN-JAN VAN ESSCHE - KHAYAL	17/12/2024	15/06/2025
Fashion & Interiors. A Gendered Affair.	29/03/2025	03/08/2025
RESOLUCIÓN: On lifetime decisions in Spanish cinema	12/07/2025	23/11/2025
GIRLS. On Boredom, Rebellion and Being In-Between	27/09/2025	01/02/2026
Embroidering Palestine	13/12/2025	07/06/2026
The Antwerp Six	20/03/2026	17/01/2027
