= Kaila Methven =

American fashion and lingerie designer

- Born: c. 1992; Santa Monica, California, U.S.
- Occupations: Fashion and lingerie designer

Kaila Methven (born c. 1992) is an American fashion and lingerie designer.

== Life and career ==
Kaila was born in Santa Monica, California. She lived with her mother Lisa Methven, until her mother's death. Later she moved to Paris to live with her father. She trained in art of design at the ESMOD and earned her master's degree from the IFA Paris. Later, She did her MBA in Luxury Brand Management at the Polimoda.

Kaila is founder of Madame Methven. She debuted her collection at LA Fashion Week. Since then, she has been featured in magazines, including Maxim US. Kaila won Best International Designer of the year awards, Haute Couture Lingerie and Haute couture Pret A Porter. Her designs have been seen on many celebrities, including Katharine McPhee, Demi Lovato, Apollonia Kotero, Kitty Brucknell and cast members of The Real Housewives of Beverly Hills. She is also an LGBT activist.

=== Chicken heiress ===
In 1960, Kaila's maternal grandfather, Stanley Methven, founded a company, Rainbow Chicken Unlimited, which in the 1980s at one time supplied 90% of the chicken sold by Kentucky Fried Chicken. Following the release of the KFC-produced short film, A Recipe for Seduction, Vanity Fair noted of Methven:

She is not, to be clear, a relative of the actual Colonel Sanders, and the Sanders family has not owned KFC since 1964. And yet, Methven would like us to believe her connection to the company is so intrinsic that, as she told Fox News, people now think the short film is based on her real life.

Methven found aspects of the film itself to be "very vulgar and definitely not something that the Methven family would ever approve of".

== Filmography ==
| Year | Title | Role | Notes |
|---|---|---|---|
| 2017 | Ken Boxer Live | Herself | TV series |
| 2018 | Hollywood Madness | Herself | TV series |
| 2018 | Good Morning Lala Land | Herself | TV series |

=== Accolades ===
- 2016 - Prêt à porter Gold Award, International Design Awards
- 2016 - lingerie Silver Award, International Design Awards
- 2018 - Global Designer of The Year Award, The Elite Awards
