= Massimiliano Giornetti =

Italian fashion designer (born 1971)

Massimiliano Giornetti (born 29 October 1971 in Carrara) is an Italian fashion designer. He has been the creative director of the luxury goods company Salvatore Ferragamo from 2004 to 2016, and the creative director at the Hong Kong luxury fashion house Shanghai Tang since 2018.

Giornetti is currently the Director of Polimoda, a fashion school based in Florence, Italy. He was appointed to the position in 2021, following a career in the fashion industry. As Director, he oversees the academic and institutional development of the school.

== Education and career ==
A graduate in English language and literature, he attended the fashion design course at the Polimoda in Florence, and has worked with the London College of Fashion and the Fashion Institute of Technology in New York City.

Giornetti's career in the fashion industry began in Rome where he worked for a year with designer Anton Giulio Grande on the development of the ready-to-wear and haute couture collections; he later worked as a designer for a knitwear company specializing in cashmere.

=== Salvatore Ferragamo ===
Giornetti began working in the men's division at Salvatore Ferragamo in July 2000, becoming creative director in 2004.

In January 2010, he began designing the women's ready-to-wear collection, and after a few months he was appointed creative director for the entire Ferragamo label, becoming the company's first creative director.

In 2011, Giornetti presented the first Salvatore Ferragamo women's resort collection with an intimate show held in the former residence of heiress, philanthropist and art collector Doris Duke (one of the last mansions on Millionaire's Row of New York City's Fifth Avenue).

He left the brand in March 2016. Writes The New York Times, "When his collections were well received, Mr. Giornetti was often praised for polish and poise, but this could be a double-edged sword. Guy Trebay, the men’s wear fashion critic for The New York Times, reviewing Mr. Giornetti’s most recent men’s wear collection in January [2016], faulted it for 'an excess of correctness.'"

=== Collections ===
In 2012, Salvatore Ferragamo was involved in a project combining art and history. The company sponsored the Saint Anne – Leonardo da Vinci's Ultimate Masterpiece exhibition at the Louvre museum in Paris between 29 March and 25 June 2012. To mark the occasion, Giornetti presented the Salvatore Ferragamo women's resort 2013 collection in the Louvre's Denon Wing, marking the first time that the museum had opened its internal spaces for a fashion show. Supermodels, including Bianca Balti, Isabeli Fontana, Karolína Kurková, and Karmen Pedaru, paraded on a 140-metre (460-foot) catwalk in front of over 500 VIP guests.

In 2013, Salvatore Ferragamo was the title sponsor of the inaugural evening of the Wallis Annenberg Center for the Performing Arts in Beverly Hills, California, where Giornetti presented the Salvatore Ferragamo spring/summer 2014 collection, highlighted by evening gowns designed especially for the occasion and inspired by the brand's founding in Hollywood almost 100 years ago.

== Awards ==
- November 2011: GQ Spain – "Man of the Year" award for best designer
- November 2012: Marie Claire Spain – "Best accessory collection" of the year award
- August 2013: "City of Carrara award for excellence – category Made in Italy"
- November 2013: GQ Mexico – International Designer of the year

== See also ==
- Italian fashion
- List of fashion designers
- List of Italians
