= Justina Blakeney =

American designer and author

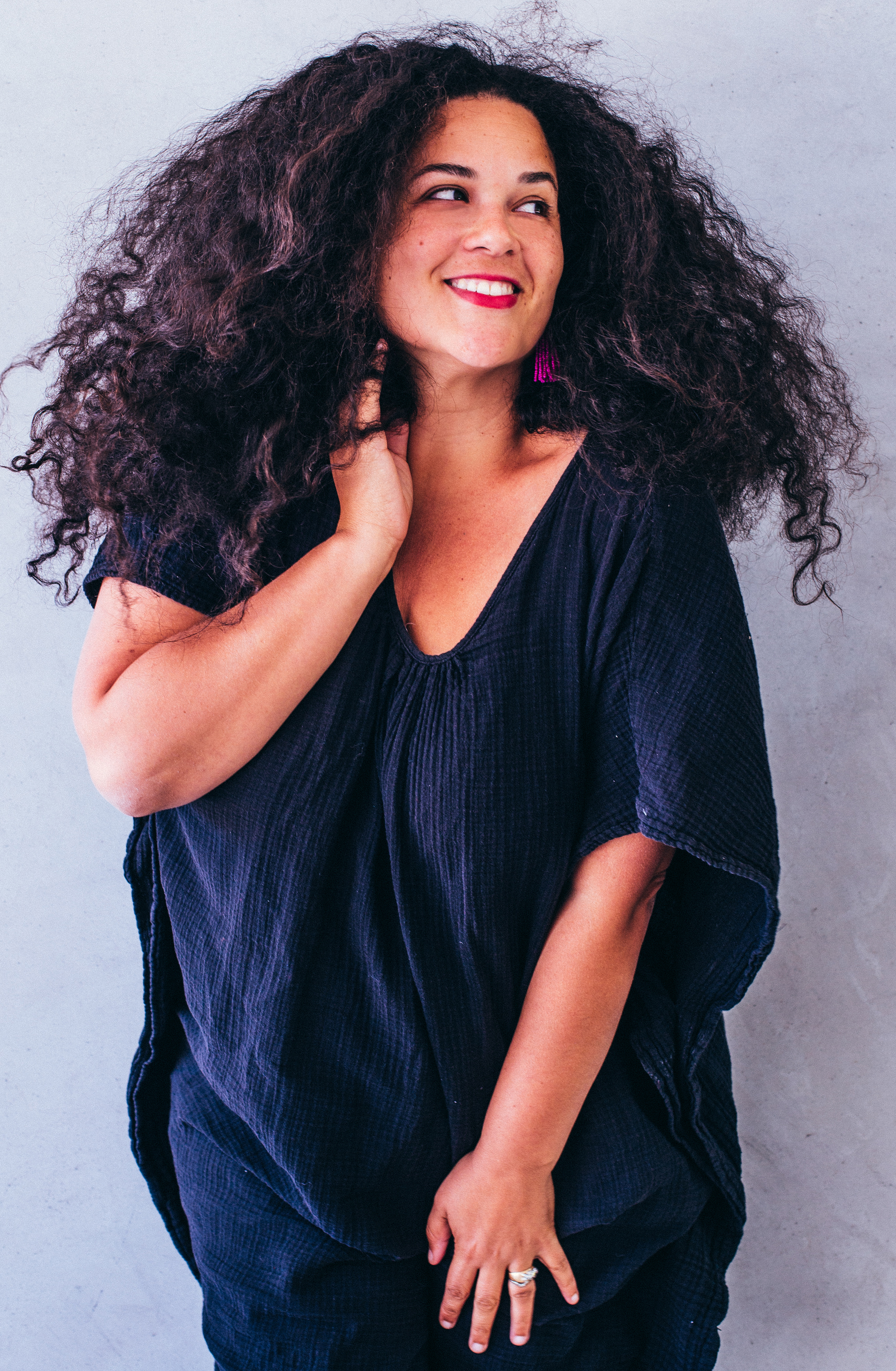
- Born: 1979 (age 46–47); Berkeley, California
- Education: UCLA
- Occupations: Designer, writer
- Spouse: Jason Rosencrantz
- Children: 1
- Website: www.justinablakeney.com

Justina Blakeney is an American designer, artist, interior designer, writer, and speaker known for her "boho" aesthetic. She founded the houseware and home decoration brand Jungalow. Her first book, The New Bohemians: Cool and Collected Homes, was a New York Times bestseller.

== Early life and education ==
Blakeney grew up in Berkeley, California. Her mother is of Eastern European Jewish descent and her father is of African-American, Native American, Irish, and French descent. Blakeney was raised Jewish, and her father was a convert to Judaism. Her mother's family were Jewish immigrants to New Jersey at the turn of the century. Her family celebrated the Jewish holidays, including Hanukkah and Passover, and did not celebrate Christmas like some other secular Jewish families they knew. Blakeney states that this multi-ethnic background and California upbringing influenced her bohemian aesthetic.

She graduated from UCLA in 2001 with a B.A. in World Arts and Cultures. In her junior year of university, she went to Italy to study fashion and communication. She moved back to Italy after graduation, and enrolled in the fashion school Polimoda.

== Career ==
Blakeney named her design and lifestyle blog "Jungalow," a combination of jungle and bungalow. Using the blog and social media as platforms, Blakeney created a collection of shaggy rugs for Loloi, a wallpaper collection with boutique firm Hygge & West, the Justina Blakeney Home collection with Anthropologie, a bedding line at Target, and a home fabrics collection with Calico Corners stores. She has a line at Living Spaces, and a collection of bedding, storage, lighting, and small gifts for Pottery Barn Kids.

Her designs for fashion retailer Moda Operandi, including portraits of fashion icons such as Grace Jones, were featured in Vogue magazine.

=== Books ===
Her first book, The New Bohemians: Cool and Collected Homes, was released in 2015. The New Bohemians: Come Home to Good Vibes was released in October 2017. These are coffee table books with design photos featuring residences, and include resources such as houseplant guides and project instructions.

=== Speaking engagements ===
- Alt Summit
- Makers Summit
- AIGA Design Conference: Business + Entrepreneurship
- Design Bloggers Conference
- WITHIT
- Pinterests' Knit Con
- Creative Mornings

== Personal life ==
Blakeney lives with her husband and daughter in a 1926 bungalow located in the Frogtown neighborhood of Los Angeles. Their home was featured in interior decorating magazine House Beautiful.
