= Veronique Branquinho =

Belgian fashion designer

Veronique Branquinho (born in Vilvoorde, 1973) is a Belgian fashion designer of Portuguese ancestry.

She studied at the Royal Academy of Fine Arts in Antwerp, from which she graduated in 1995. In 1997, she presented her first womenswear collection in Paris and in 1998 she founded her namesake brand Veronique Branquinho. She quickly rose to prominence in the international fashion scene and in 2003 she extended her brand with fall men's collection. In 2009, she decided to stop her label, as a consequence of the 2008 financial crisis, but she revived it three years later, in collaboration with Italian manufacturer Gibò (now Onward Luxury Group). This was only a brief revival, as the brand was discontinued again in 2017. Branquinho was based in Antwerp, while her runway shows took place in Paris, the last of which was shown in June 2017.

== Education ==
Branquinho studied sciences at a local high school in her native Vilvoorde, but she took evening classes in drawing and painting. She decided to pursue these creative interests and enrolled in the Saint-Luke's Academy, a Brussels high school focusing on the arts. In 1991, influenced by the success of the Antwerp Six, Branquinho decided to continue her higher education at the Fashion Department of the Royal Academy of Fine Arts in Antwerp. She graduated from the academy in 1995.

== Career ==
After her graduation, Branquinho worked for Belgian labels such as Natan and Neuf sans Neuf, and she interned at Miu Miu, an Italian fashion house in the Prada Group. Before launching her namesake brand in 1998, she presented her very first collection in a showroom at the Paris fashion week of 1997. This Spring Summer 1998 womenswear collection, inspired by the neo-romanticism of David Hamilton’s photography and Peter Weir's 1975 film Picnic at Hanging Rock was such an immediate success that Branquinho had to close her showroom two days early, to avoid putting too much strain on her production ateliers. Encouraged by this success, Branquinho staged her first live fashion show in Paris, for her Autumn Winter 1998-99 collection. In 2003, she added a menswear line to her label, and in the summer of that same year she opened her own Veronique Branquinho store in Antwerp. In 2006, she presented her first Complice collection, combining menswear and womenswear silhouettes into one show—in addition to her separate menswear and womenswear shows. In 2009, she was appointed artistic director of Delvaux, a Belgian brand of luxury leather goods.

Later that same year, in the aftermath of the 2008 financial crisis, Branquinho had to discontinue her brand. Nevertheless, she continued her work at Delvaux and she continued to design shoes for Iris, a company part of the Italian luxury group Gibò (now Onward Luxury Group), with which she had collaborated for over a decade. After three years, Branquinho revived her namesake brand in collaboration with Onward Luxury Group, presenting her Spring-Summer 2013 womenswear collection at the Paris fashion week in 2012. One major change was that Branquinho relinquished menswear and that, from now on, she also designed resort and pre-collections. However, in 2017, Branquinho again decided to discontinue her label.

After this most recent break, Branquinho continued to work in fashion afterwards, through various collaborations. Prior to closing down her own label, Branquinho had already collaborated with numerous other brands. From 1999 through 2000, she designed for the Italian Ruffo Research and she had collaborated with labels such as Camper (2009–11) and Marie Jo (2011). She continued in the same vein, designing for Belgian fashion brands such as Terre Bleue, the bridal label Marylise & Rembo, or the fashion and haberdashery brand Veritas. For the latter she designed a series of handbags and stockings, and a series of DIY sewing and knitting pattern.

== Awards and other projects ==
In 1998 Branquinho was granted the VH1 Fashion Award for best new designer. Two years later, in 2000, she also received the Belgian Moët Fashion Award for best new fashion designer. In 2007, she guest-curated the fashion periodical A Magazine. She also held a teaching position as a professor at the fashion department of the University of Applied Arts in Vienna from 2005 to 2009. To celebrate the ten-year anniversary of her label, the MoMu Fashion Museum in Antwerp organised the retrospective exhibition MOI, VERONIQUE. BRANQUINHO TOuTe NUe in 2008. Finally, in 2010, Branquinho was awarded the Wallpaper Design Award for best new recruit for her work at Delvaux.
