= Bárbara Sánchez-Kane =

Mexican menswear fashion designer

Barbara Sánchez-Kane is a Mexican menswear fashion designer. She is known for her experimental and political statements mixed with her fashion designs.

== Early life and background ==
She is from Mérida, Yucatán, Mexico, and was born around . Her mother is a United States citizen. She completed a degree from Universidad Anahuac in industrial engineering in 2015 and later went on to complete another in fashion design from Polimoda in Florence, Italy. Barbara is a feminist and advocate for gender equality. She has spoken out against U.S. President Donald Trump for his anti-Mexican policies.

Growing up in her small Catholic town in Mexico didn't allow her to artistically express herself, thus after moving to Italy, she found a release in Fashion. As well as experimenting with her sexuality. She incorporates her culture and her own likes/quirks into her clothing, she describes it as traditional culture mixed with her own twist and sarcasm.

== Career ==
In 2016, Sánchez-Kane showed her work at the VFILES show in New York. The collection was named "Citizen," and included references to the Trump presidential campaign, Mexico and LGBT issues.

Sánchez-Kane showed her work at the New York Fashion Week in 2017, where her models had the phrase, "alternative facts" drawn on their faces in place of mustaches. The name of the collection was "Men Without Fear." Her work at the show both drew on her Mexican heritage and her own inner feelings, drawn from journals and childhood memories. Her work at Fashion Week also referenced the water crisis that many parts of the world are facing.

In 2017, she presented a piece of performance art called "Deseo de un placer absurdo", with the artist, Orly Anan, at the Noche Blanca event in Mérida.

Her brand of clothing is eponymous, and called Sánchez-Kane. She describes the brand as a "Mexican clothing brand curated by emotional chaos." The brand was first launched in 2015. The brand caught the attention of Vogue Italia in 2015 with a clothing line called "Catch as Catch Can," featuring Mexican wrestling masks.
