= Polimoda =

Private school in Italy

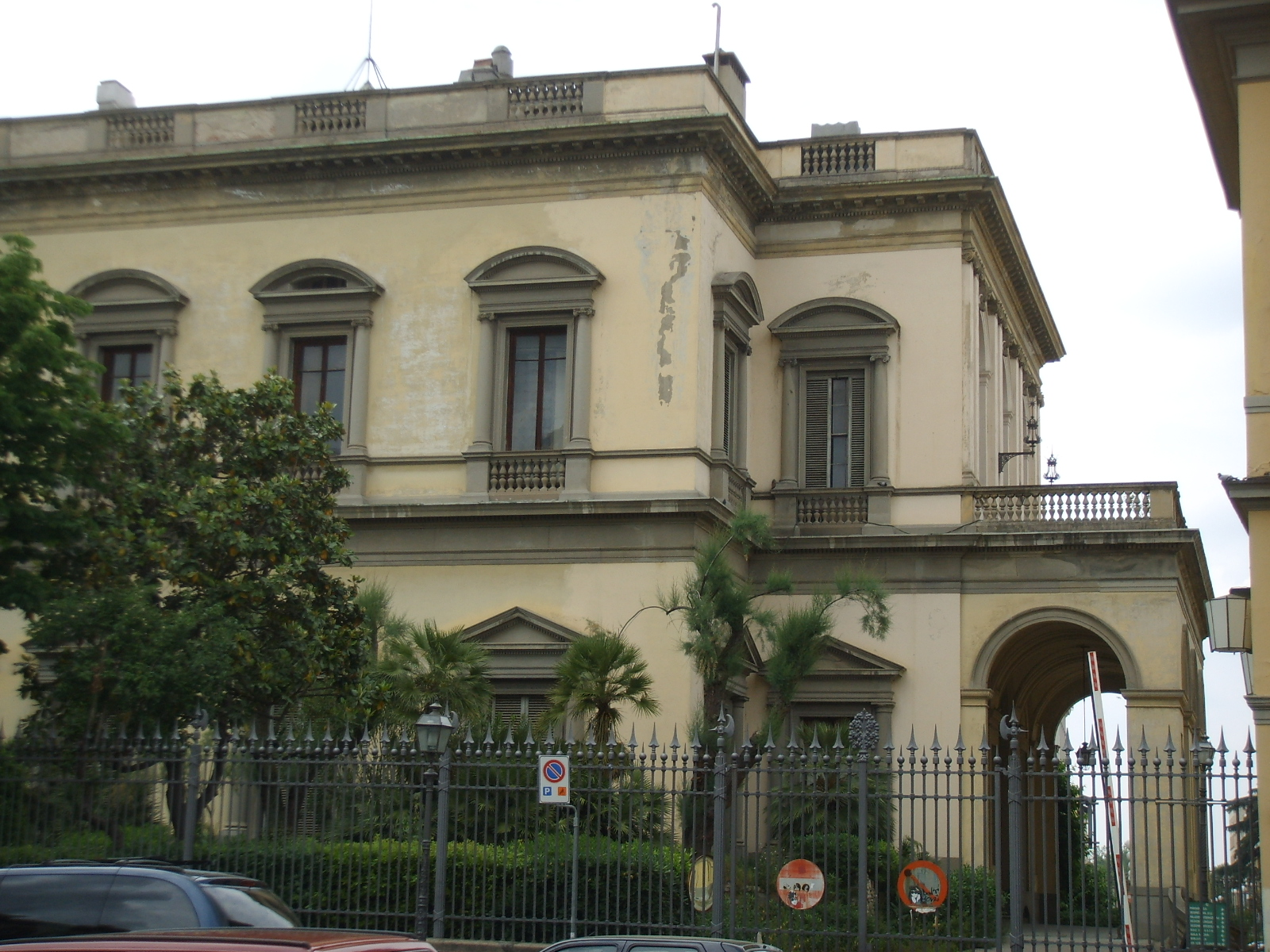
- Villa Favard, entrance to the school
- Type: Fashion school
- Established: 1986
- President: Ferruccio Ferragamo
- Dean: Massimiliano Giornetti
- Location: Florence, Tuscany, Italy
- Campus: Villa Favard; via Curtatone, 1; 50123 Florence
- Website: www.polimoda.com
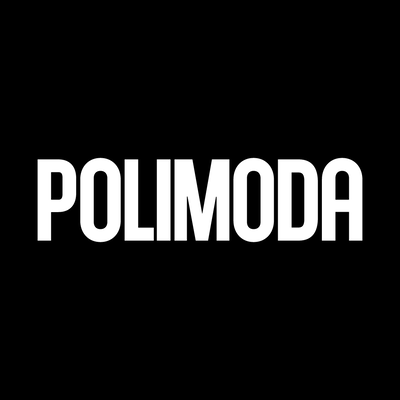

Ente per le Arti applicate alla Moda e al Costume ("Institute for the Arts Applied to Fashion and Costume"), abbreviated as Polimoda, is a private fashion school in Florence, capital of Tuscany, Italy. The school was originally founded by Shirley Goodman, the former Executive Vice President Emeritus at Fashion Institute of Technology (FIT) in New York and Executive Director of the Educational Foundation for the Fashion Industries, and Don Emilio Pucci, Marquis of Barsento and founder of the famous Florentine brand Emilio Pucci. The management staff today includes Ferruccio Ferragamo as the President, Massimiliano Giornetti as the Director and Linda Loppa as the Advisor of Strategy and Vision.

== History ==
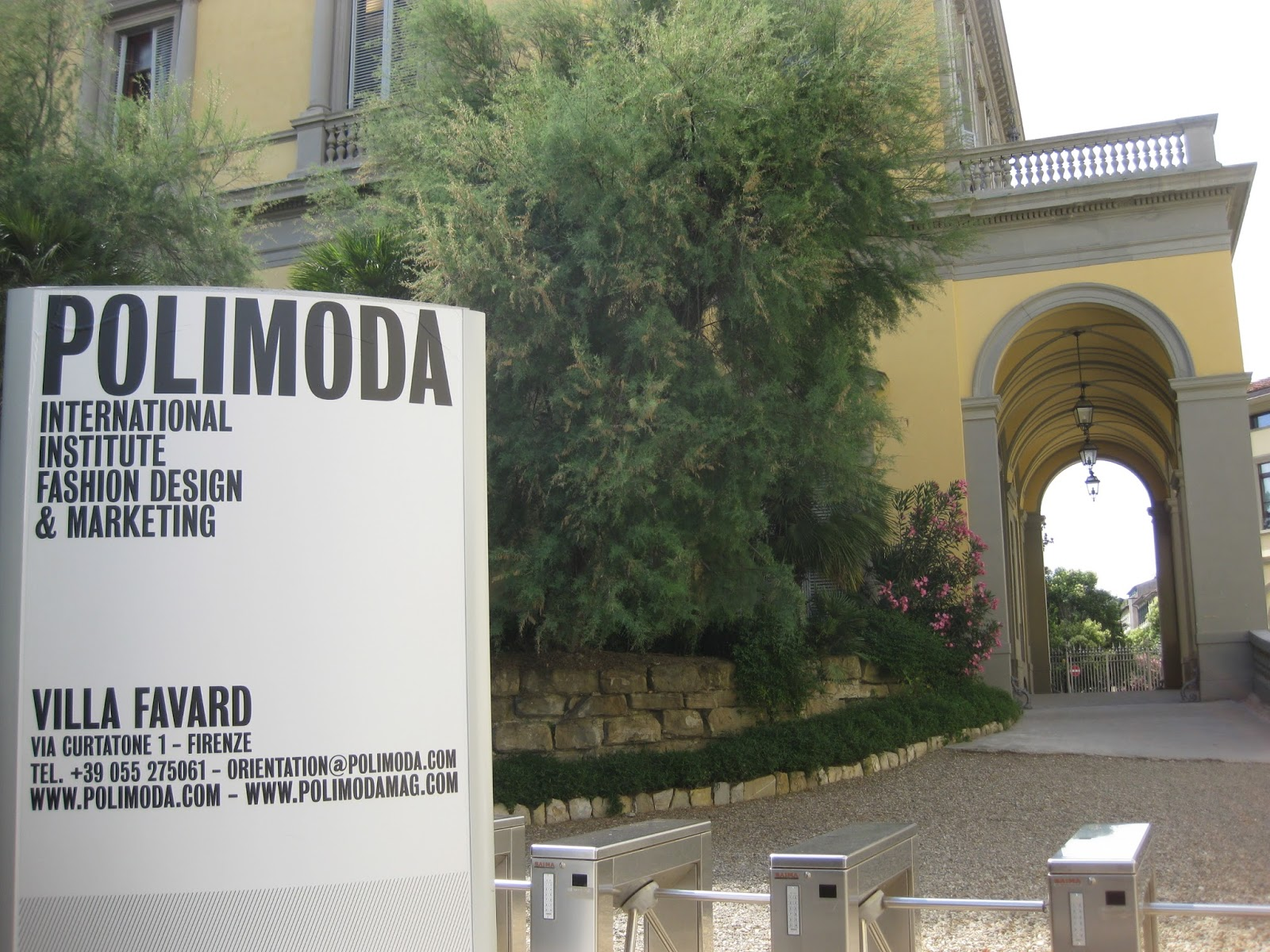
Polimoda head-quarter in Florence, capital of Tuscany, Italy

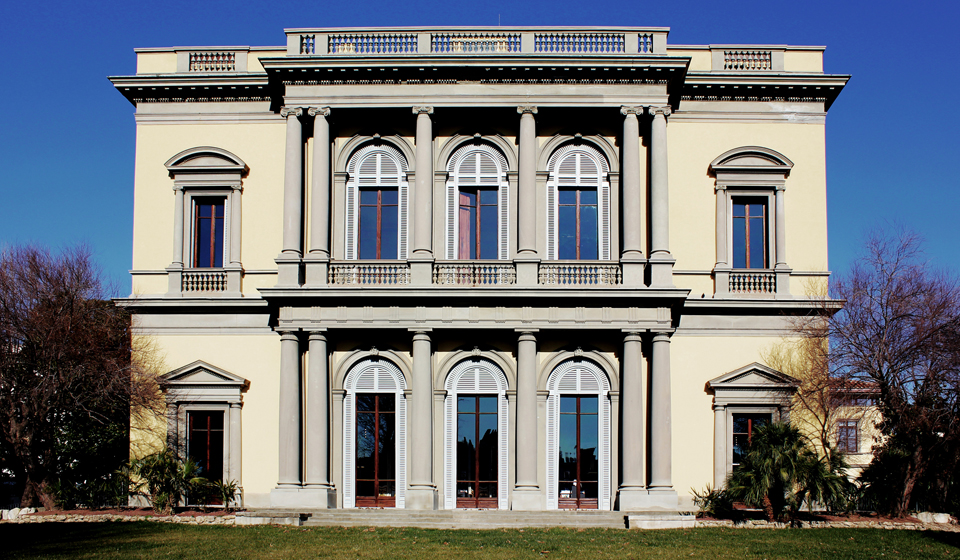
Polimoda Library in Florence, capital of Tuscany, Italy

The school was founded in 1986 as a joint project of the city of Florence and Prato, and the Fashion Institute of Technology of State University of New York, currently has 2 campuses in Florence. It is a member of the International Foundation of Fashion Technology Institutes. It is listed by the Italian ministry of education, the Ministero dell'Istruzione, dell'Università e della Ricerca, among the institutions authorised to award degrees in music, dance and the arts, for the Undergraduate in Fashion Marketing Management.

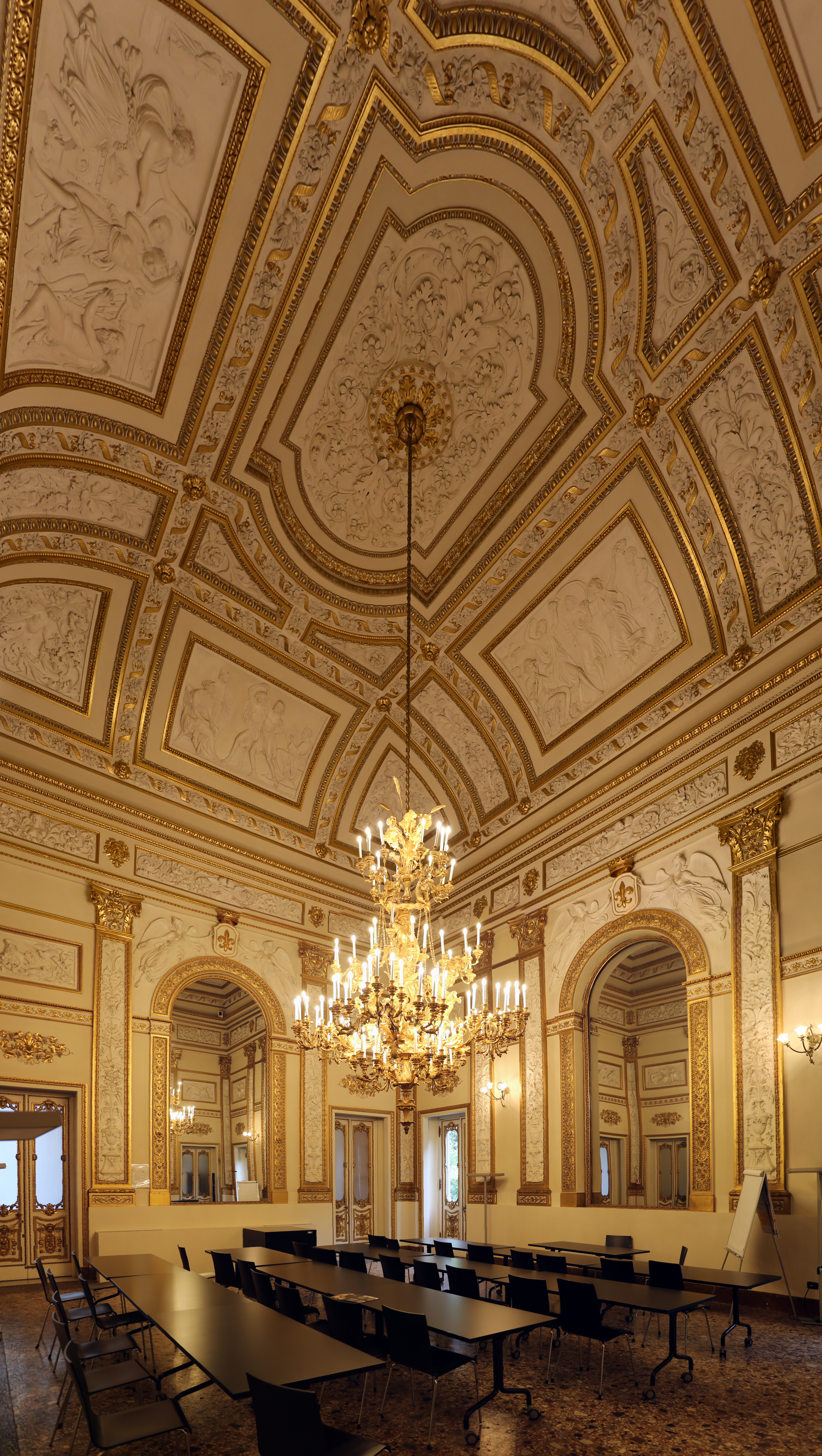
Villa Favard, Polimoda student head-quarter in Florence, capital of Tuscany, Italy

In 1986, Polimoda was founded as Politecnico Internazionale della Moda in an agreement between two international centres of fashion, and two trailblazers of the industry. Shirley Goodman, the former Executive Vice President Emeritus at Fashion Institute of Technology (FIT) in New York and Executive Director of the Educational Foundation for the Fashion Industries, and Don Emilio Pucci, Marquis of Barsento and founder of the famous Florentine brand Emilio Pucci, came together to create a centre for excellence in fashion education, to serve the city as much as the global industry. The first classes took place at Villa Strozzi in central Florence that year, and the Institute has only grown in strength and influence since then.

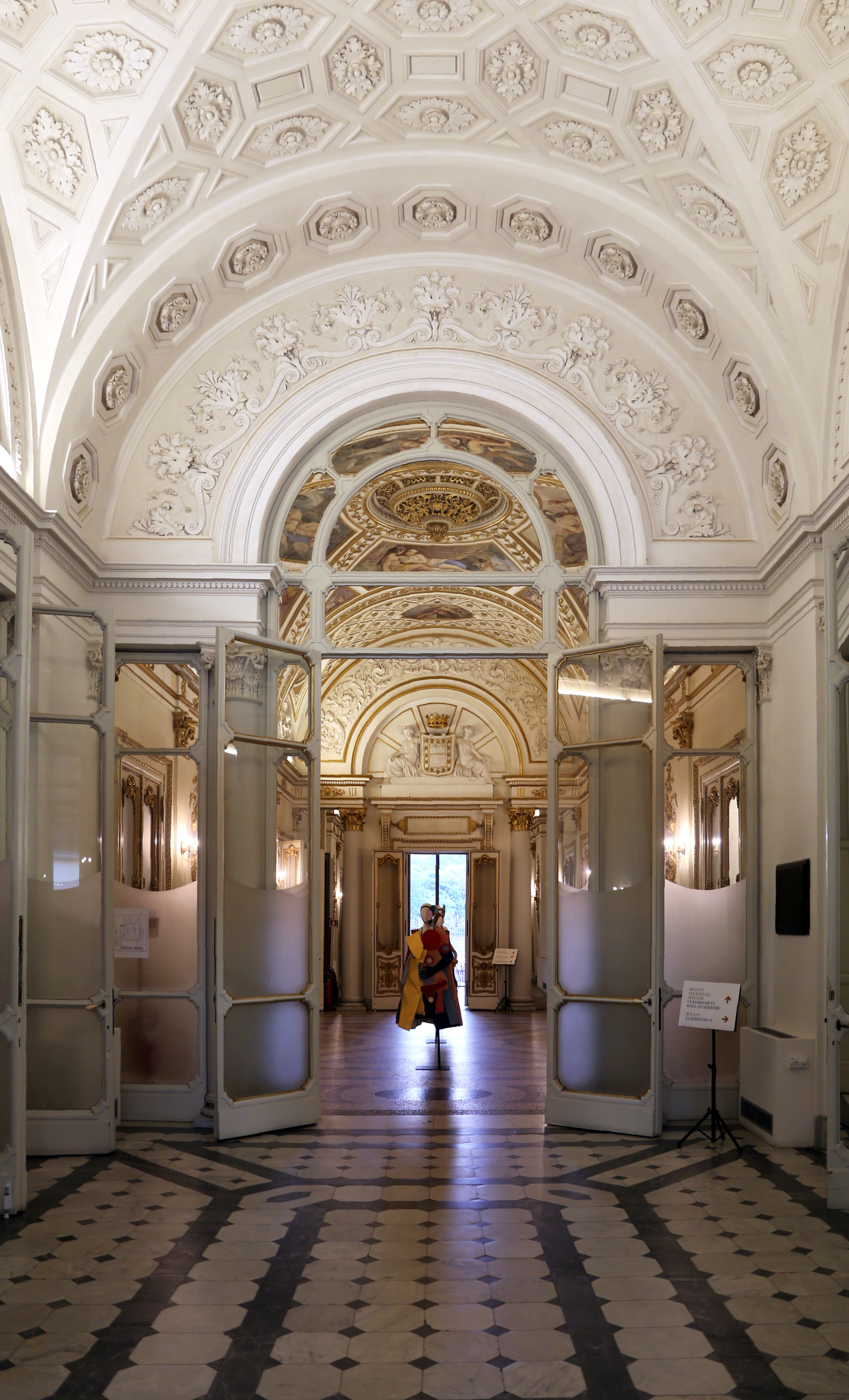
The corridor of the Polimoda school of Fashion Business department

A second campus dedicated to knitting and textile creation opened in Prato in 1992, and later in 2000, a third outpost specialising in design was inaugurated in Via Baldovinetti. Bringing together these two purposes in one unified space, the Polimoda Design Lab put down roots in its current location in Scandicci in 2015.

In 2006, Polimoda welcomed its new President, Ferruccio Ferragamo, who was joined by Linda Loppa, former Director and current Advisor of Strategy and Vision. This marked a new era for the Institute, and together in 2011, they inaugurated the campus at Villa Favard where the school remains today.

Massimiliano Giornetti, former Creative Director of Salvatore Ferragamo and Polimoda head of fashion design department, was named the new Director in 2021. He is a Polimoda Fashion Design alumnus and believes in the school's internationality, connection with the city of Florence and development of relationships with the most important companies of the sector.

It offers full-time courses at undergraduate and postgraduate levels, as well as a variety of short courses. In 2018 there were about 2300 students of 75 nationalities on three campuses.

== Departments ==
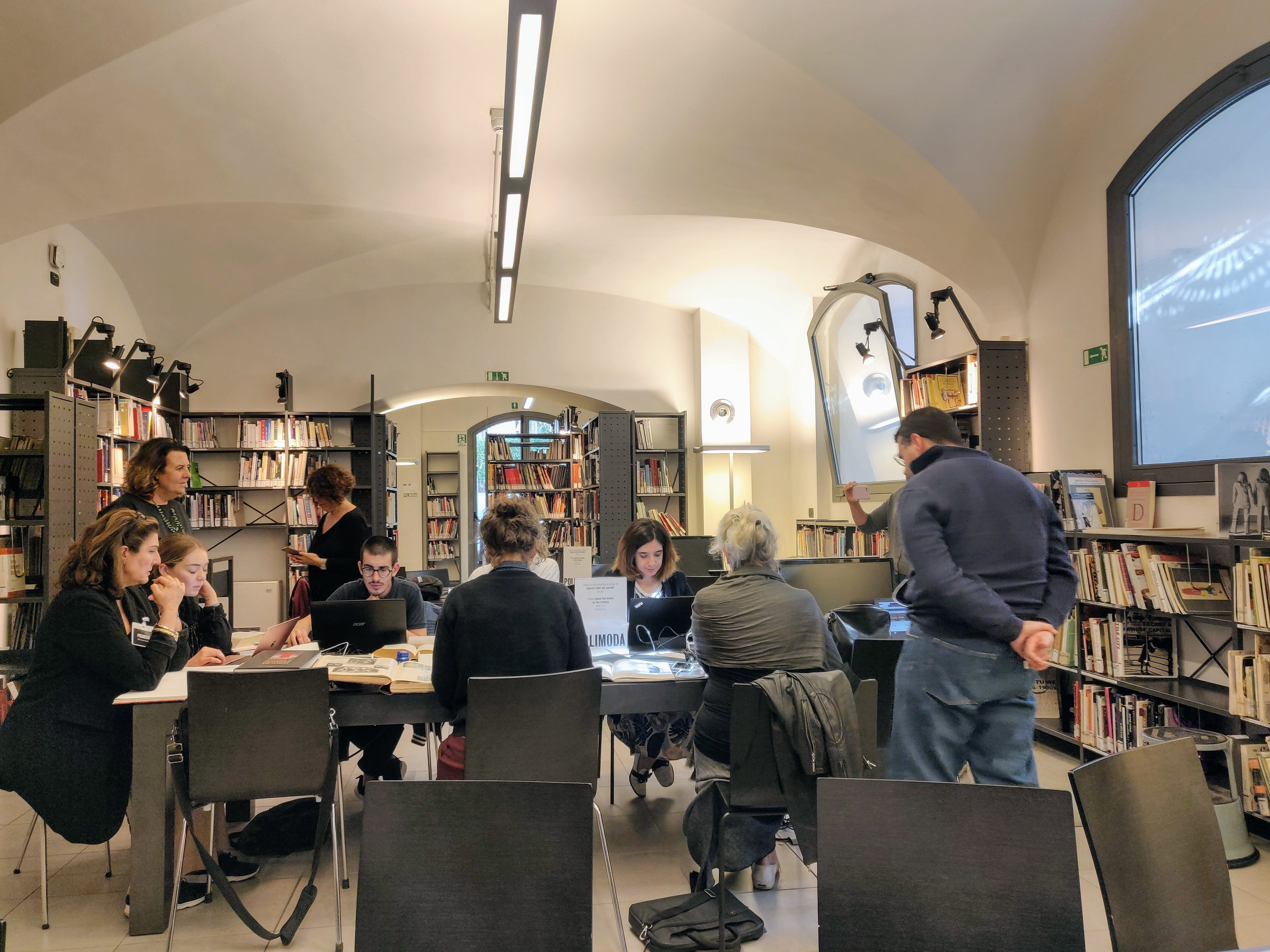
Wiki Loves Fashion 2019 edit-a-thon at Polimoda in Florence, capital of Tuscany, Italy

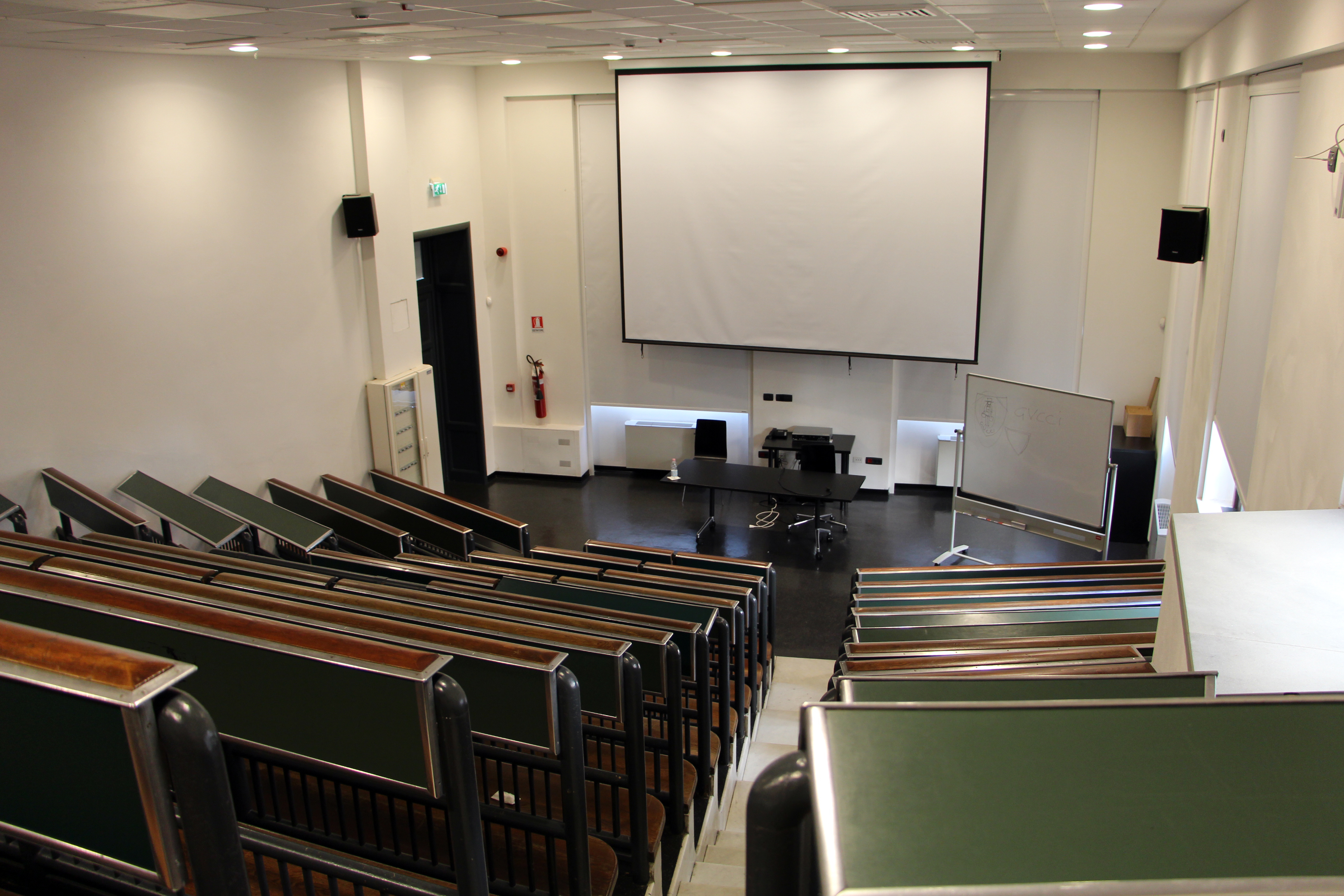
The student classroom in Polimoda

Polimoda offers undergraduate, post-graduate, and doctoral programmes in design, management, and technology. Undergraduate programs across the areas of Fashion Design, Fashion Business, Art Direction and Fashion Marketing Management. Polimoda also offers 3-month internships towards the end of these courses to further develop students’ skills in a professional setting and introduce them into the working world.

- Digital Strategy for Fashion
- Fashion Design
- Fashion Business
- Fashion Art Direction
- Fashion Styling
- Fashion Marketing Management
- Atelier Design
- Fashion Accessories Design
- Product Management
- Fashion Design Management

== Presidents ==
- Alberto Amorosi
- Lorenzo A. Ferracci
- Giovanni Maltinti
- Renato Cesare Ricci
- Ferruccio Ferragamo

== Directors ==
- Alan H. Fishman
- Georgianna Appignani
- Philippe Taylor
- Linda Loppa
- Danilo Venturi
- Massimiliano Giornetti

== Notable alumni ==
Alumni of the school include

- Justina Blakeney - American designer, artist, interior designer, author, and speaker.
- Sheila Bridges - American interior designer who founded her own firm, Sheila Bridges Design, Inc., in 1994.
- Meagan Cignoli - American photographer, filmmaker, and businessperson who is the founder and creative director of Visual Country, a video production agency.
- Massimiliano Giornetti - Italian fashion designer, creative director of Salvatore Ferragamo from 2010 to 2016, creative director of Shanghai Tang.
- Bárbara Sánchez-Kane - Mexican menswear fashion designer.
- Samu-Jussi Koski - Finnish fashion designer, founder and creative director of Samuji.
- Kaila Methven - American fashion and lingerie designer.
- Francesco Risso - Italian fashion designer, creative director of Marni since 2016.
- Laksmi Shari De-Neefe Suardana - Indonesian fashion designer, author, UNICEF activist, G20 Ambassador, co-founder Ubud Writers & Readers Festival, model, and beauty pageant titleholder who was crowned Puteri Indonesia 2022 (Miss Universe Indonesia 2022).
- Moses Turahirwa - Rwandan businessman, fashion designer, creative director and founder of Moshions fashion line.
- Italo Zucchelli - Italian fashion designer, creative director of Calvin Klein men's collection from 2004 to 2016.
- Rachele Risaliti - Italian model and beauty pageant titleholder of Miss Italia 2016.
