= Bárbara Sánchez (Ecuadorian footballer) =

Ecuadorian footballer (born 1987)

Personal information
- Full name: Bárbara Ofelia Sánchez Rivas
- Date of birth: 23 April 1987 (age 39)
- Place of birth: Guayaquil, Ecuador
- Position: Centre back

International career^{‡}
Years	Team	Apps	(Gls)
2006	Ecuador	4	(0)
- ‡ National team caps and goals as of 10 November 2006

Bárbara Ofelia Sánchez Rivas (born 23 April 1987) is an Ecuadorian former footballer who played as a centre back. She has been a member of the Ecuador women's national team.

== International career ==
Sánchez capped for Ecuador at senior level during the 2006 South American Women's Football Championship.
