= Rue Marbeuf =

Street in Paris, France

Coordinates: 48.8685°N 2.3034°E

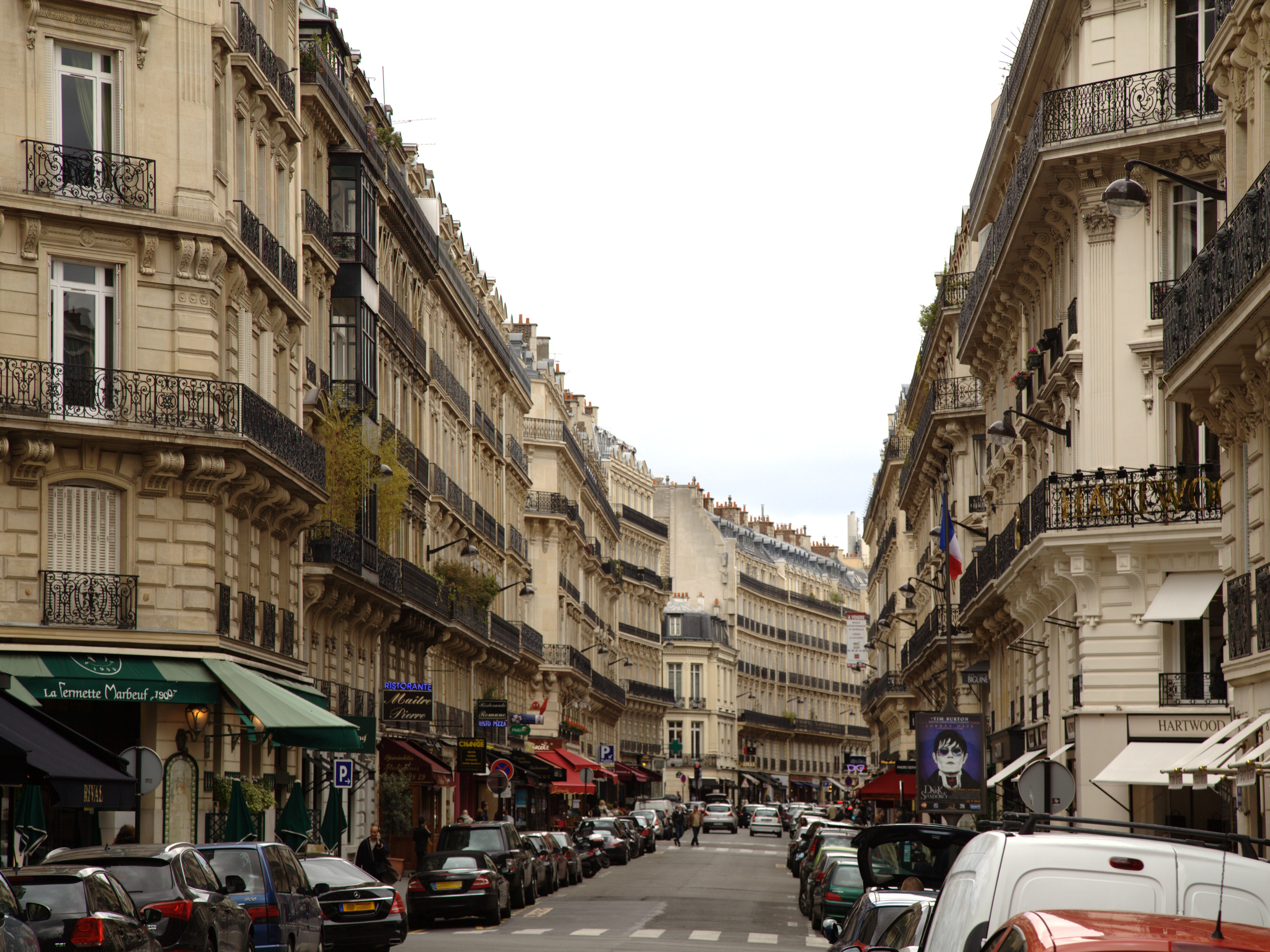
Rue Marbeuf, view from the Avenue George V

The Rue Marbeuf is a street in the 8th arrondissement of Paris. It starts at no. 20 Avenue George V and ends at no. 39 Avenue des Champs-Élysées. It is 460 m long and 16 m wide. The original Berluti store is at 26, rue Marbeuf.

== See also ==
- Man Ray (bar)
