= Alessandro Sartori =

Italian fashion designer (born 1966)

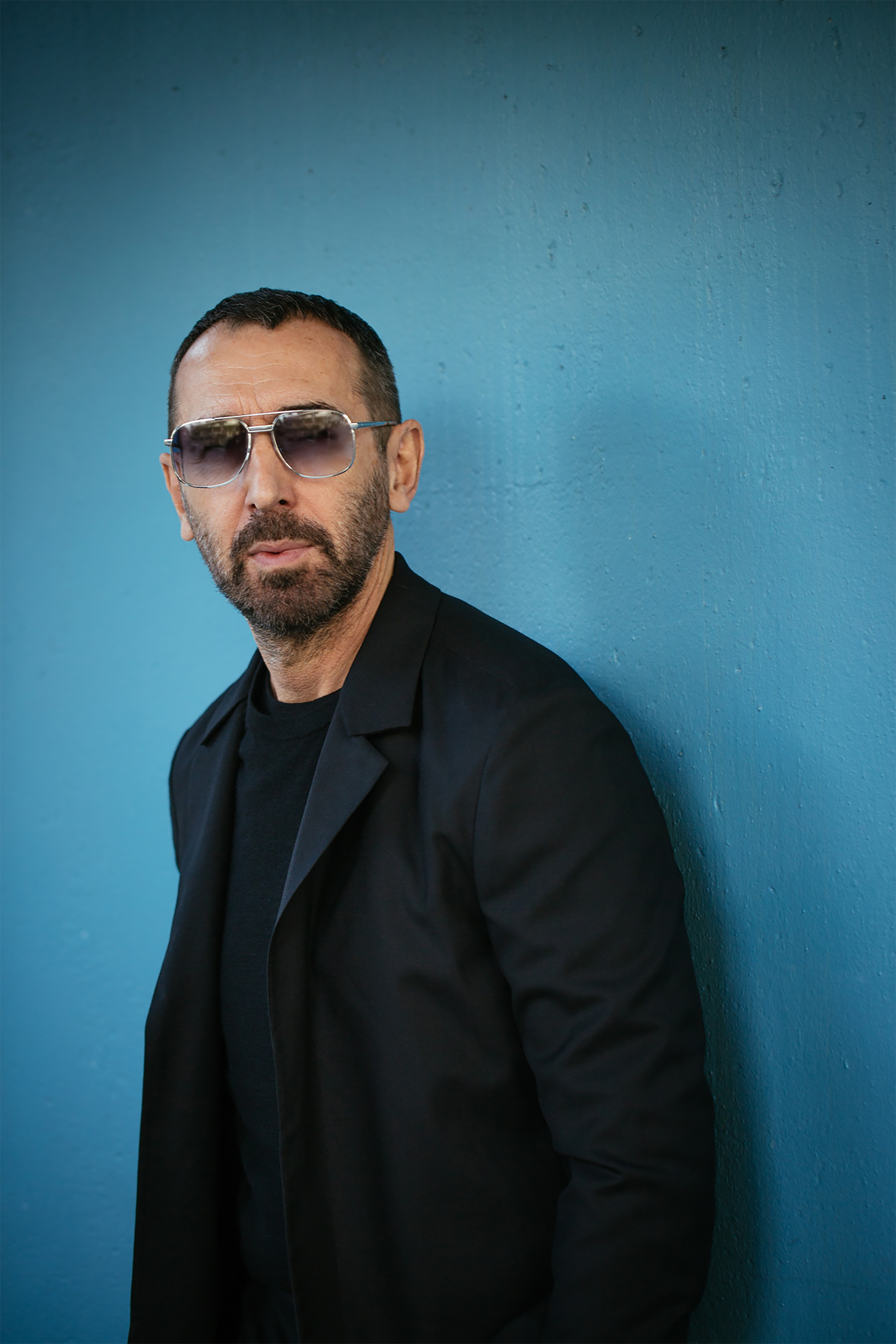
- Born: 14 September 1966 (age 60); Biella, Italy
- Occupation: Fashion designer
- Known for: Artistic Director for Ermenegildo Zegna

Alessandro Sartori is an Italian fashion designer, and the artistic director of Italian brand Zegna. Previously, he was creative director of Z Zegna and artistic director of Berluti.

== Early life ==
Sartori was born in Trivero, in the Biella province, to a seamstress mother. He grew up spending time in his mother's dressmaking atelier.

He graduated in textile in Biella, Italy, before earning a degree in fashion design in 1989.

== Career ==
=== Zegna, 1989–2011 ===
In 1989, Sartori began his career at Zegna and worked as a men's wear designer for many years.

In 2003, Sartori became creative director of the newly created "Z Zegna" at Ermenegildo Zegna. He presented the Z Zegna first runway show in New York City in February 2007. Z Zegna successfully appeared at five New York Fashion Weeks, and then moved to Milan starting in June 2009.

=== Berluti, 2011–2016 ===
On 1 July 2011 Sartori was appointed as artistic director at Berluti with the aim of creating a luxury total wardrobe.

On January 20, 2012, Sartori unveiled his first collection at the Ecole des Beaux-Arts, with footwear occupying rows of chairs lined up as if for a fashion show. Women's Wear Daily stated "It was an impressive debut." "Sartori’s collection was worn by a multigenerational cast of models in vignettes that telegraphed the Berluti lifestyle: playing chess in the library of a country chateau; having cocktails in a groovy apartment; gathering with friends under a full moon for a midnight shoe-polishing party, with Dom Pérignon as the shining agent (something serious Berluti devotees actually do)."

Sartori's last collection for Berluti was presented during Paris Menswear Fashion Week, on January 22, 2016.

On February 1, 2016 Women's Wear Daily confirmed the rumors about Sartori leaving Berluti.

=== Zegna, 2016–present ===
On February 5, 2016 Ermenegildo Zegna Group announced that Sartori was appointed artistic director with responsibility across all Zegna brands and all creative functions. Sartori officially joined the Ermenegildo Zegna Group in June 2016. His first fashion show was the Ermenegildo Zegna Couture Autumn/Winter 2017 collection at HangarBicocca.

Under his direction, in 2017 Zegna opened its first Bespoke Atelier in Milan.

Later in June of the same year, Sartori made his debut at the cloister designed by Bramante within the University of Milan, presenting the summer collection. The show drew inspiration from Tangier, with the cloister bathed in warm shades of orange, evoking the hues of the city.

In January 2018, for the Fall/Winter 2018 ready-to-wear collection, Sartori chose the Bocconi campus, where a winter scene was recreated inside an auditorium. Immersed in the brutalist architecture of the venue, models walked along a snow-covered runway that began next to a small snow mound, while artificial snow gently fell from above. The collection blended formal and informal elements, mirroring the contrast between the icy setting and the raw architectural backdrop.

Later in June, Sartori unveiled the Spring/Summer 2019 collection at Mondadori Palace. The collection's theme, Weightlessness, found its expression in the building's striking design, which seems to hover effortlessly above the water.

In 2019 Sartori chose wide, urban spaces in Milan – such as Stazione Centrale and former production plant Area Falck – as stages to his collections.

In January 2019 for the first time, during the Ermenegildo Zegna XXX Winter 2019 fashion show, Sartori unveiled the #USETHEEXISTING project, which is entirely made with innovative processes from pre-existing sources.

During the COVID pandemic, Sartori favored fashion films as a creative source and presented the Fall/Winter 2021 collection with "The (Re)Set", directed by Mattia Benetti, and the 3 following seasons as a form of fashion film.

In 2023, for the Spring/Summer 2024 collection, Sartori brought the vision of the “Oasi of Linen” to life in Milan's Piazza San Fedele. Surrounded by 192 flax bales sourced from Normandy, the venue underlined the season's signature material.

== Collaborations ==
For many years, Sartori has partnered with Benjamin Millepied, co-founder of the L.A. Dance Project. In 2015/2016 he designed costumes for Millepied's team at the Paris Opera Ballet. In 2017 all the dancers of the L.A. Dance Project performed in Marfa, Texas, wearing Ermenegildo Zegna Couture custom made looks for a streaming life worldwide premiere. In 2019, the L.A. Dance Project performed the world premiere of Bach Studies (part 2) at Théâtre des Champs-Elysées in Paris, wearing Ermenegildo Zegna XXX custom designs by Sartori.

In 2018, Sartori designed suits for actress Tilda Swinton for her role as Josef Klemperer in Luca Guadagnino’s movie Suspiria. That same year, he began designing costumes for Genny Savastano, one of the main characters of the Italian series Gomorra, played by Salvatore Esposito.

In recent years, Sartori's work has been seen across various platforms. He dressed Italian singer Diodato for the Sanremo Music Festival and Marracash for his 2022 tour. He also created custom looks for Daniel Brühl for the global premiere of the series Becoming Karl Lagerfeld.

== Personal life ==
Sartori owns several vintage car models, including a signal orange 1970 Porsche Targa, a midnight blue 1965 Ford Mustang, and a bronze 1981 Porsche Turbo.

He is particularly fond of Leica cameras and portrait of human characters. He recently photographed the artist Michelangelo Pistoletto for the cover of Autre magazine.

== Awards and honors ==
- 2005 – Best International Designer of the Year, awarded by GQ Spain
- 2015 – Best Designer of the Year, awarded by GQ Spain
- 2019 – I'm Alumni Award, awarded by Istituto Marangoni
- 2022
  - XII Edition Premio Nazionale per l’Innovazione, Premio dei Premi for #UseTheExisting
  - WWD Menswear Designer of the Year
- 2023 – Man of the Year, awarded by Esquire Spain
