= Haider Ackermann =

French fashion designer (born 1971)

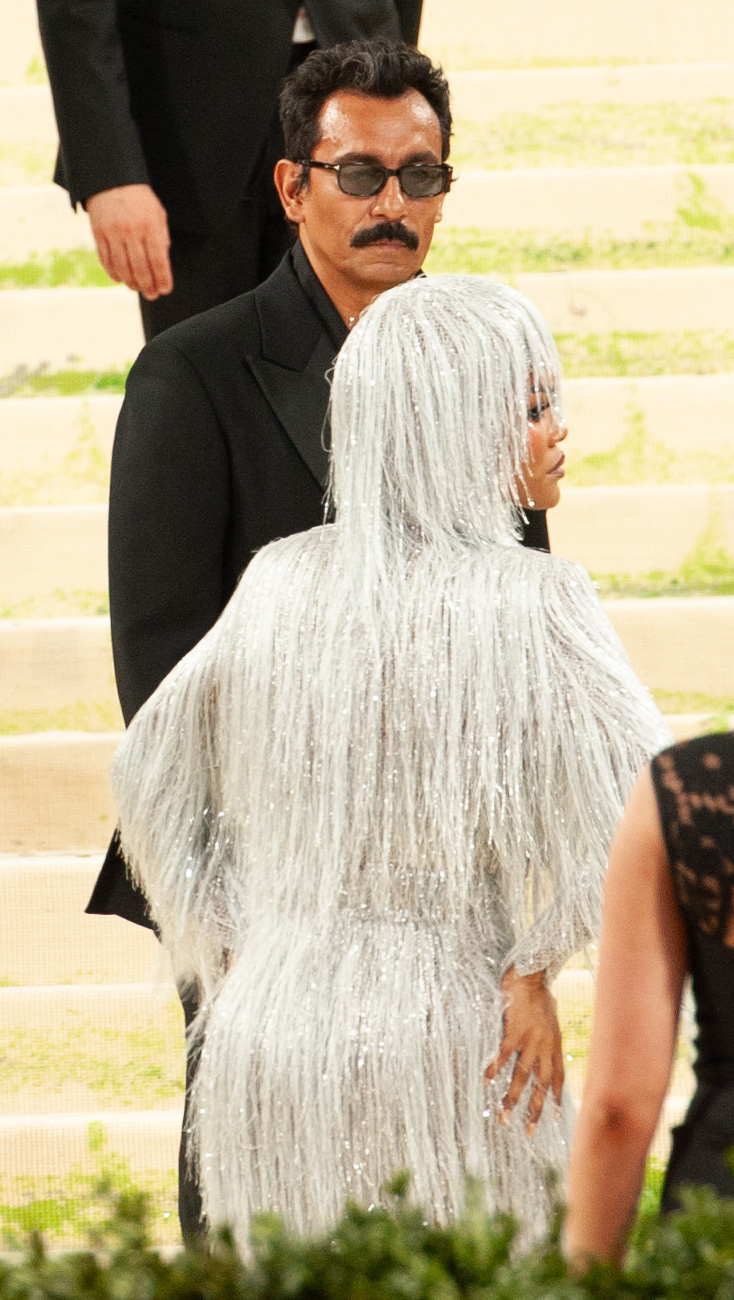
- Ackerman observing Teyana Taylor in his design at the 2026 Met Gala
- Born: March 29, 1971 (age 55); Bogotá, Colombia
- Education: Royal Academy of Fine Arts
- Occupation: Fashion designer
- Years active: 1994–present
- Awards: Fashion Group International Award (2012)
- Website: haiderackermann.be

Haider Ackermann (born 29 March 1971) is a Colombian-born French designer of ready-to-wear fashion. He lives in Paris, and is currently creative director of Canada Goose and Tom Ford.

== Early life ==
Born in Bogotá, Colombia in 1971, Ackermann was adopted at the age of nine months by a French Alsatian family. His adoptive father is a mapmaker. Ackermann spent his childhood in Ethiopia, Chad, Algeria and France before the family moved to the Netherlands when he was twelve.

== Career ==
Inspired by the work of Yves Saint Laurent, Ackermann went to Belgium in 1994 and studied fashion design at the Royal Academy of Fine Arts in Antwerp. He was expelled in 1997 for failing to turn in course assignments.

After five months of internship with John Galliano, Ackermann worked as an assistant to one of his teachers, the Belgian designer Wim Neels. In the following years he worked for various brands, including Bernhard Willhelm and Patrick Van Ommeslaeghe before working as a designer for Mayerline.

=== Haider Ackermann, 2001–present ===
In 2001, Ackermann created his own label and presented his first women's wear collection in March 2001 during Paris fashion week. His 2002 collection drew the attention of house Ruffo, premium leather clothing specialist, which hired him to direct the spring-summer collections and autumn-winter 2003 for Ruffo Research. In 2005, he signed with the Belgian group BVBA 32 and set up his studio in Paris.

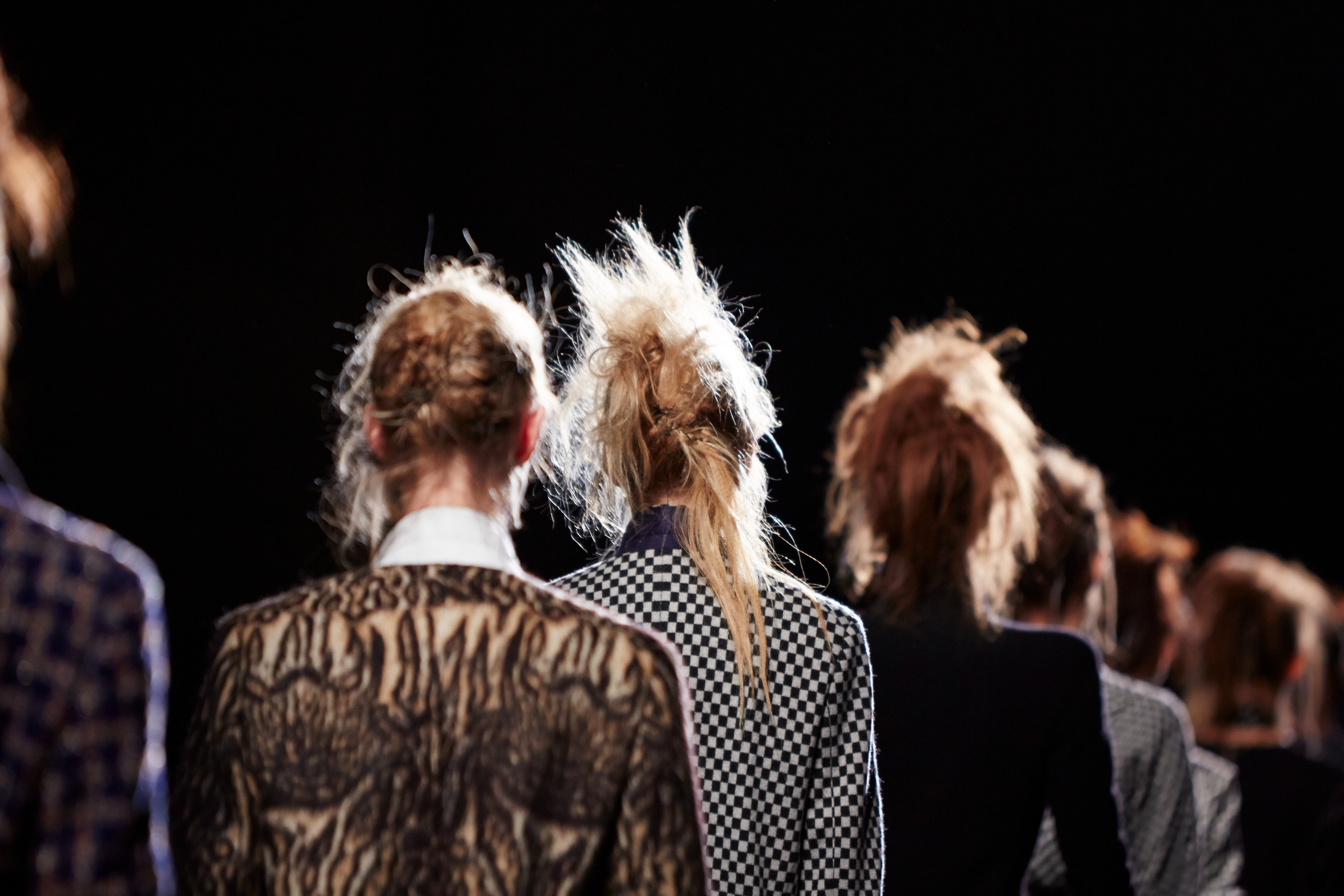
Haider Ackermann fashion show at the Paris Fashion Week Fall-Winter 2015

Ackermann was one of the designers approached to succeed Galliano at Dior, after declining the proposed succession of Martin Margiela in 2009. In 2010, Karl Lagerfeld described him as his ideal successor at Chanel, and some commentators called him a "new Yves Saint-Laurent".

Influenced by cultural differences, Ackermann's fashion contrasts and blends dress codes. The simple cuts of his creations are often asymmetric and sewn of different materials. His creations have been worn by Tilda Swinton, Timothée Chalamet, Nastya Hevchuk, Penélope Cruz, Victoria Beckham, Janet Jackson and Kanye West.

In 2010, Ackermann launched a one-off menswear collection during the Pitti trade shows in Florence. In June 2013, entrepreneur Anne Chapelle of 32 BVBA fashion house announced that the Ann Demeulemeester and Haider Ackermann labels would be split into two independent companies. Ackermann subsequently launched his first full menswear line that year.

In 2014, Ackermann worked on a Mercedes-Benz campaign with Tilda Swinton.

=== Berluti, 2016–2018 ===
Ackermann joined Berluti as creative director in September 2016, succeeding Alessandro Sartori and showed his first collection for the label in January 2017. During his tenure, he introduced a more languid, feminine edge into the collections, which were shown on men and women. His role involved not only the full product design, including sporting accessories, but also ad campaigns, image and stores. He also continued to run his own women’s and men’s lines concurrently with his job at Berluti. By March 2018, Ackermann and Berluti parted ways after just three seasons.

Ackermann and Timothée Chalamet first met in Paris in 2017 at the request of Chalamet's agent Brian Swardstrom. Ackermann styled the actor for his first red carpet at the 2017 Berlin International Film Festival. They have maintained a creative partnership since then, with Chalamet describing Ackermann as "one of [his] closest friends". In 2021 they designed a hoodie with 100% of the proceeds going to French organization Afghanistan Libre, which is centered around preserving the rights of women in Afghanistan.

=== Tom Ford and Canada Goose, 2024–present ===
Ackermann was appointed as creative director of both Canada Goose and Tom Ford in 2024. Chalamet debuted the first-ever look by Ackermann at Tom Ford, a sequined black suit, on the red carpet of the 82nd Golden Globe Awards.

== Awards ==
Year	Title
2004	Swiss Textiles Award
2012	Fashion Group International Award, presented by Karl Lagerfeld
2026	Womenswear Designer of the year

.
