= Italian fashion =

Overview of fashion in Italy

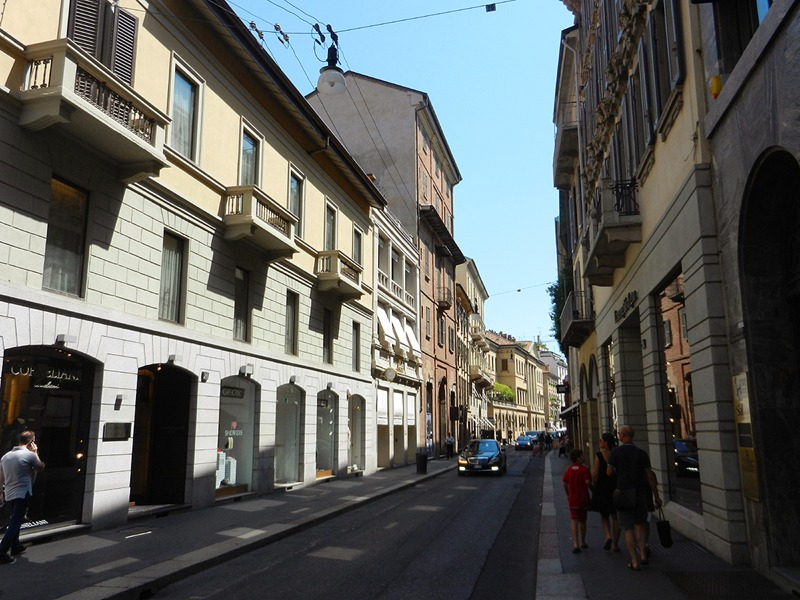
Via Monte Napoleone in Milan, the most expensive street in the world (2024). It is famous for its ready-to-wear fashion and jewelry shops, and for being the most important street of the Milan fashion district known as the Quadrilatero della moda, where many well-known fashion designers have high-end boutiques. The most exclusive Italian shoemakers maintain boutiques on this street.

Italy is one of the leading countries in fashion design, alongside France and the United Kingdom. Fashion has always been an important part of the country's cultural life and society, and Italians are well known for their attention to dress. The concept of la bella figura, or good appearance, retains its traditional importance in Italian society. As such, Italian fashion brands are associated with the core values of Italianness or italianità, which consumers have embraced globally.

Italian fashion became prominent during the 11th to 16th centuries, when artistic development in Italy was at its peak. Cities such as Rome, Palermo, Venice, Milan, Naples, Florence, and Vicenza started to produce luxury goods, hats, cosmetics, jewelry, and rich fabrics. From the 17th century to the early 20th century, Italian fashion lost its importance and lustre, and Europe's main trendsetter became France, with the great popularity of French fashion; this is due to the luxury dresses designed for the courtiers of Louis XIV. Since the 1951–1953 period, fashion soirées held by Giovanni Battista Giorgini in Florence, the "Italian school" started to compete with the French haute couture, and labels such as Prada and Gucci began to contend with Chanel and Dior. In 2009, according to the Global Language Monitor, Milan, Italy's centre of design, was ranked the top fashion capital of the world, and Rome was ranked fourth. Although both cities fell in subsequent rankings, Florence entered as the 31st world fashion capital in 2011. Milan is generally considered to be one of the "big four" global fashion capitals, along with New York, Paris, and London; occasionally, the "big five" also includes Rome.

Italian fashion is linked to the most generalized concept of "Made in Italy", a merchandise brand expressing excellence of creativity and craftsmanship. Many French, British, and American high-top luxury brands (such as Chanel, Dior, Hermès, and the main line of Ralph Lauren) also rely on Italian craft factories, located in highly specialized areas in the metropolitan area of Naples and in the centre-north of Italy (Tuscany, Marche, Veneto, Lombardy, and Piedmont), to produce parts of their apparel and accessories.

The nonprofit association that co-ordinates and promotes the development of Italian fashion is the National Chamber of Italian Fashion (Camera Nazionale della Moda Italiana), now led by Carlo Capasa. It was set up in 1958 in Rome, is now settled in Milan and represents all the highest cultural values of Italian fashion. This association has pursued a policy of organisational support aimed at the knowledge, promotion and development of fashion through high-profile events in Italy and abroad. Young and upcoming designers are also promoted in Italy, as in the annual ITS (International Talent Support Awards) young fashion designer competition in Trieste.

== Italian fashion houses, designers and luxury brands ==
Examples of major Italian fashion houses focused on both menswear and womenswear, but also accessories:

- Armani (founded by Giorgio Armani and now directed by Leo Dell’Orco and Silvana Armani for the main lines and haute couture and by Dario Vitale for Emporio Armani and accessories)
- Balestra
- Bottega Veneta (now designed by Louise Trotter after Matthieu Blazy's directorship)
- Roberto Cavalli (directed by Fausto Puglisi)
- Costume National
- Brunello Cucinelli
- Diesel (previously directed by Glenn Martens)
- Dolce & Gabbana
- Dsquared2 (created by Canadian duo Dean and Dan Caten)
- Etro (previously directed by Marco De Vincenzo)
- Fendi (previously directed by Karl Lagerfeld for women's clothes and ready to wear and Silvia Venturini Fendi for accessories, now headed by Maria Grazia Chiuri)
- Ferragamo (designed by Maximilian Davis)
- Ferrari (designed by Rocco Iannone)
- Gianfranco Ferré
- Fiorucci (now under the directorship of Francesca Murri)
- Gucci (formerly directed by Tom Ford, Frida Giannini, Alessandro Michele and Sabato De Sarno and from March 2025 by Georgian designer Demna Gvasalia, ex creative director at Kering's Balenciaga)
- Iceberg (directed by James Long)
- Jil Sander (founded by eponymous German designer but headquartered in Italy and previously designed by Lucie and Luke Meier, now directed by Simone Bellotti, heading also at Swiss house Bally)
- John Richmond
- Kiton
- Loro Piana
- Marni (founded by Consuelo Castiglioni and now directed by Meryll Rogge after the long directorship of Francesco Risso)
- Missoni (directed by Alberto Caliri)
- Miu Miu (founded and directed by Miuccia Prada)
- Moncler
- Moschino (created by Italian duo Loris Messina and Simone Rizzo, after the long directorship of Jeremy Scott and the short periods under Davide Renne's guide and under Adrian Appiolaza)
- Prada (Raf Simons joined Miuccia Prada as creative co-director)
- Pucci (created by Camille Miceli)
- Ermanno Scervino
- Tod's (designed by Matteo Tamburini)
- Trussardi
- Valentino (founded by Valentino Garavani, formerly directed by Pierpaolo Piccioli and now by Alessandro Michele)
- Versace (founded by Gianni Versace now directed by Pieter Mulier after the short directorship of Dario Vitale and the longer supervision of Donatella Versace)

Examples of major fashion brands which specialise mainly in womenswear and also accessories for women are Laura Biagiotti, Blumarine (founded by Anna Molinari and now designed by David Koma), Capucci, Chiara Boni, Alberta Ferretti (now directed by Lorenzo Serafini), Gattinoni, Genny (designed by Sara Cavazza Facchini), Giamba (created by designer Giambattista Valli), Krizia (founded by Mariuccia Mandelli and now art directored by Zhu Chongyun), La Perla, Luisa Spagnoli, Max Mara (creative director Ian Griffiths), Philosophy, Mila Schon, and Twin-set Milano, while the most important luxury houses which focus only on menswear and accessories for men are Brioni, Canali, Cesare Attolini, Corneliani, Lardini, Stefano Ricci, Zegna (directed by Alessandro Sartori), and Pal Zileri.

Luxury sportswear and streetwear have become general fashion trends, mixing high and low, formal and active style in one look. Large luxury brands focused on ready to wear (or couture) developed their own streetware lines and items such as Gucci, Fendi, Moschino and Prada. Brands with a history of sports wear such as Bikkembergs also have participated in this trend. Companies such as GCDS and OFF White were founded in the 2010s with a focus on streetwear. In sportswear, some prominent houses are Diadora, Fila, and Kappa.

A few Italian designers head (or have headed) some important fashion brands outside Italy. Riccardo Tisci worked for French luxury house Givenchy for twelve years until 2017 and in 2018 was named British Burberry's creative director until 2022; now LVMH's Givenchy appointed Marco De Vincenzo to oversee its leather goods division; Maria Grazia Chiuri after co-heading at Valentino together with Pier Paolo Piccioli (who is at the head of Balenciaga since 2025) was the first female creative director ever at Dior until 2025; French fashion brand Rochas had been directed by Alessandro Dell'Acqua for a few years and now by Alessandro Vigilante; Marco Colagrossi heads Ungaro after a few years under the directorship of Fausto Puglisi; Nicola Formichetti was artistic director at Mugler; Veronica Leoni is Calvin Klein Collection's director; Nino Cerruti founded his own Paris-based fashion house; Giambattista Valli's main ready to wear and high fashion lines are set in Paris and Stefano Pilati was for almost eight years Saint Laurent's head designer before creating an affordable clothing and accessories line for Zara in 2024.

Bulgari jewels shop window in Madrid

Among the newest labels or younger designers, the most prominent are Calcaterra, Del Core, Federico Cina, Giuseppe Di Morabito, Golden Goose Deluxe Brand, Stella Jean, Niccolò Pasqualetti, Sa su phi and The Attico. Other luxury labels which are mainly focused on the production of leather goods such as accessories, especially belts or shoes, are Anderson's, Aquazzura, Baldinini, Ballin, Bontoni, Casadei, Rene Caovilla, Bruno Magli, Paciotti, Pollini, Gianvito Rossi, Sergio Rossi, and Giuseppe Zanotti, while fashion brands or labels which produce primarily bags, totes, suitcases are Braccialini, Furla, Mandarina Duck, Piquadro, Serapian, and Valextra. Italy is home to many fashion magazines, such as Vogue Italia, Vanity Fair, Elle, Glamour, Grazia. Other Italian accessory and jewelry brands, such as Luxottica (owner, amongst several luxury eyewear brands, of Ray-Ban and Persol), Safilo, Marcolin, Buccellati, Damiani, Vhernier, Pomellato, Dodo, Morellato, Officine Panerai, and Bvlgari.

== Economic significance ==
The Italian fashion industry is a significant component of the country’s manufacturing sector and one of its major export-oriented industries. The sector encompasses textile and apparel production as well as footwear, leather goods and other related manufacturing activities, alongside fashion design, retail and associated services.

According to Confindustria Moda, the Italian textile and apparel sector recorded a turnover of €58.39 billion in 2025 and exports of more than €36 billion. The sector comprised 37,331 companies and employed approximately 372,200 people, equivalent to around 9.5% of employment in Italian manufacturing.

Fashion is also an important component of Italy’s wider high-value consumer-goods exports. A 2025 study by the Confindustria Research Centre estimated that Italian exports of so-called “Bello e Ben Fatto” products, a category including fashion, food, furniture and jewellery, exceeded €170 billion. Fashion is among the principal sectors contributing to this group of exports.

The industry’s economic structure is characterised by a large network of specialised companies and manufacturing districts. Production is concentrated in several regions, including Lombardy, Tuscany, Veneto, Emilia-Romagna, Piedmont, Marche and Campania. These districts bring together manufacturers and suppliers specialising in textiles, clothing, footwear and leather goods and form an important part of the supply chains used by both Italian and international fashion companies.

The international dimension of the industry also extends beyond Italian-owned brands. Foreign multinational enterprises have a significant presence in Italian manufacturing and international trade, while Italian fashion companies operate extensively in foreign markets. According to Istat, foreign-controlled enterprises are particularly integrated into international trade in the manufacture of wearing apparel and leather products, illustrating the increasingly international ownership and production structure of the sector.

The economic importance of fashion is reflected in its role in Italy’s international trade, industrial employment and specialised manufacturing base. The sector is also closely associated with the wider concept of “Made in Italy”, through which Italian fashion products are marketed internationally on the basis of design, manufacturing expertise and established production networks.

== International ownership and production ==
The contemporary Italian fashion industry is characterised by a distinction between the nationality of a brand, the ownership of a company and the location of manufacturing. A number of historically Italian fashion houses are controlled by international luxury groups, while foreign-owned fashion companies may maintain substantial manufacturing operations in Italy.

Italy has a large network of specialised manufacturers supplying both domestic and international brands. This includes companies involved in textiles, ready-to-wear, footwear, leather goods and accessories. As a result, Italian manufacturing remains an important part of global luxury and fashion supply chains regardless of the ownership of the final brand.

The internationalisation of the sector is also reflected in the activities of Italian fashion companies abroad. Istat data on multinational enterprises show substantial international trade activity in textiles, wearing apparel and leather products, including both foreign-controlled enterprises operating in Italy and Italian companies operating through subsidiaries abroad.

Consequently, the term “Italian fashion” can refer to several overlapping elements: Italian fashion brands and designers, production carried out in Italy, Italian-owned companies, and the broader industrial and cultural ecosystem associated with Made in Italy.

== Luxury conglomerates ==
In recent years, several Italian luxury brands have been acquired by French conglomerates such as LVMH and Kering, consolidating French leadership in the global luxury sector. For example, LVMH acquired Fendi in 2001, Bulgari in 2011 and Loro Piana in 2013, while Kering gained control of Gucci in 1999, Bottega veneta in 2001 and Brioni in 2012. Also Swiss giant Richemont owns a few Italian houses like shoe-maker Gianvito Rossi and luxury watch manufacture Panerai. These conglomerates own a vast portfolio of high-fashion, jewelry, and leather goods brands, also managing their marketing and distribution strategies on a global scale. Italian luxury brands often do not have the same economic or organizational scale as the French or Swiss giants; however, groups like Prada by buying rival Versace in a billion dollar deal in 2025 are now increasing their dimension in order to create an Italian conglomerate to compete with multinational groups that possess greater financial resources and infrastructures.

OTB, even in a less great scale, can be considered a luxury hub of Italian and international brands (owning, among the others, Maison Margiela, Jil Sander and stocks in Amiri) competing in an increasingly globalized market. Despite a few huge foreign companies have taken control of several Italian houses, groups like Giorgio Armani, Brunello Cucinelli, Dolce & Gabbana, Ferragamo, Moncler, Tod's (which owns French brand Roger Vivier), and Zegna (which owns Thom Browne and produces Tom Ford) continue to maintain their independence. Even though the ownership of many of the most recognised Italian luxury fashion brands has changed hands, the country continues to account for a proportion of luxury production. According to a Pambianco-PwC report as much as 78% of global luxury fashion is made in Italy.

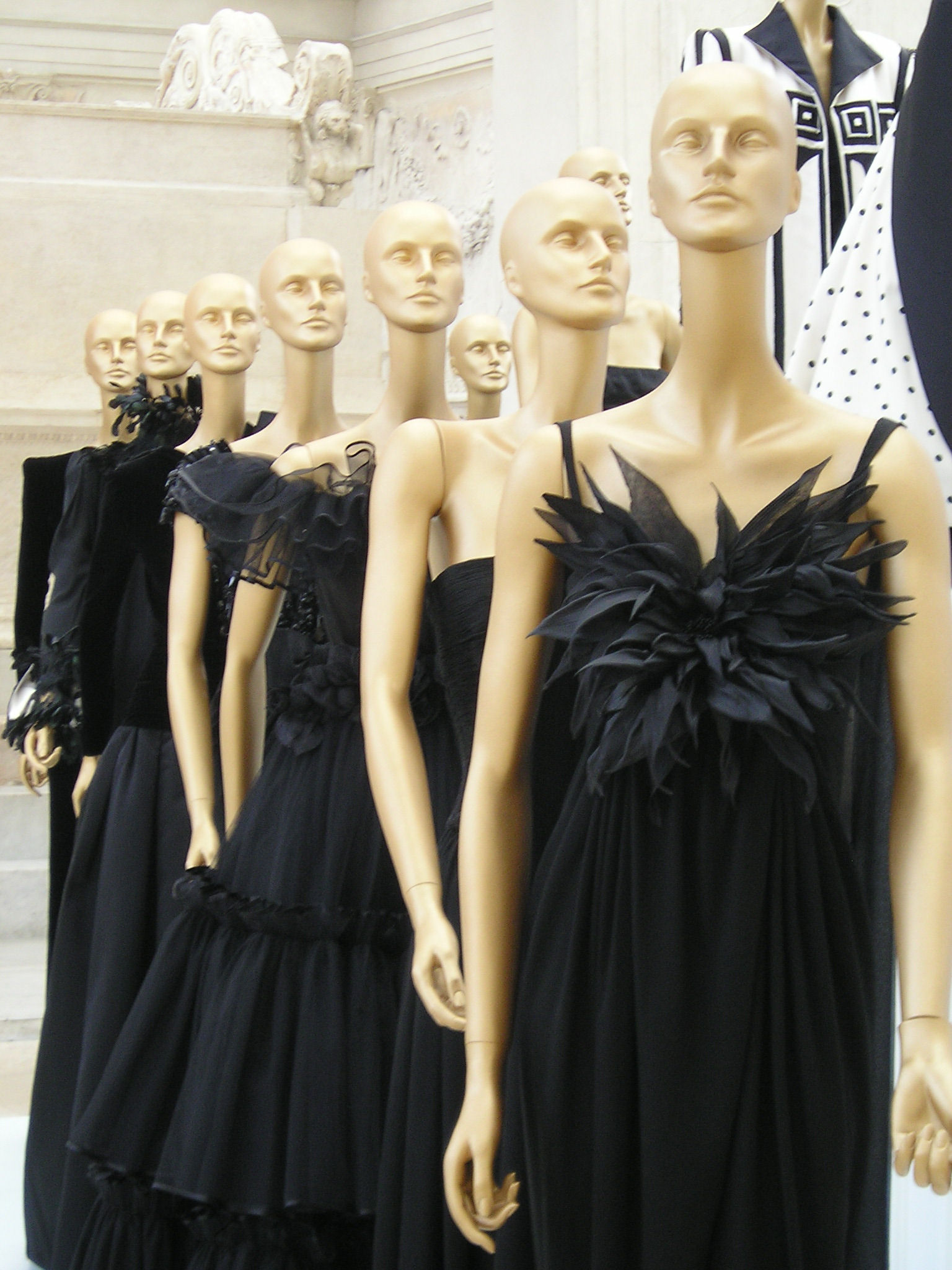
Clothes by Valentino

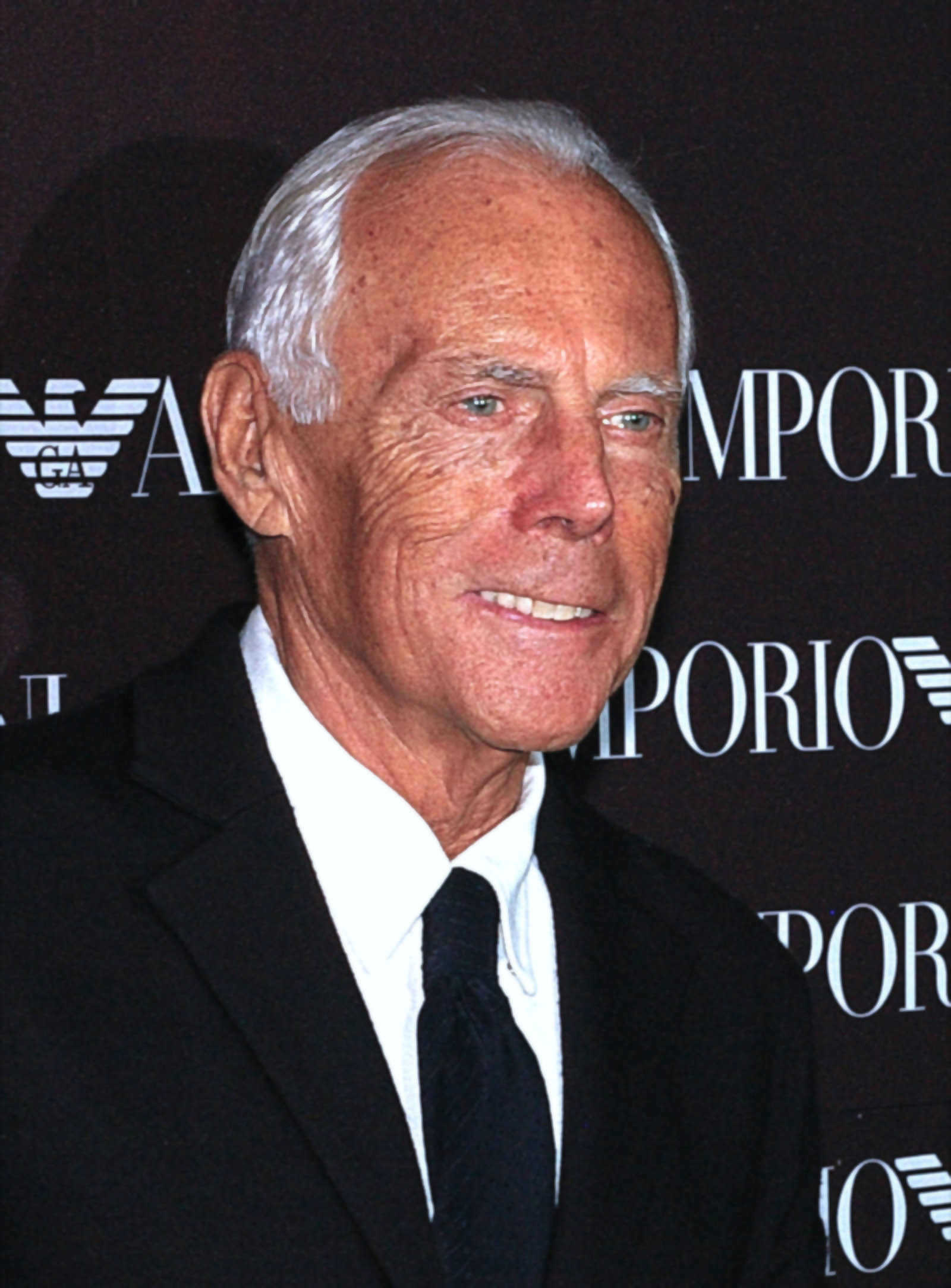
Giorgio Armani, founder of the Armani company

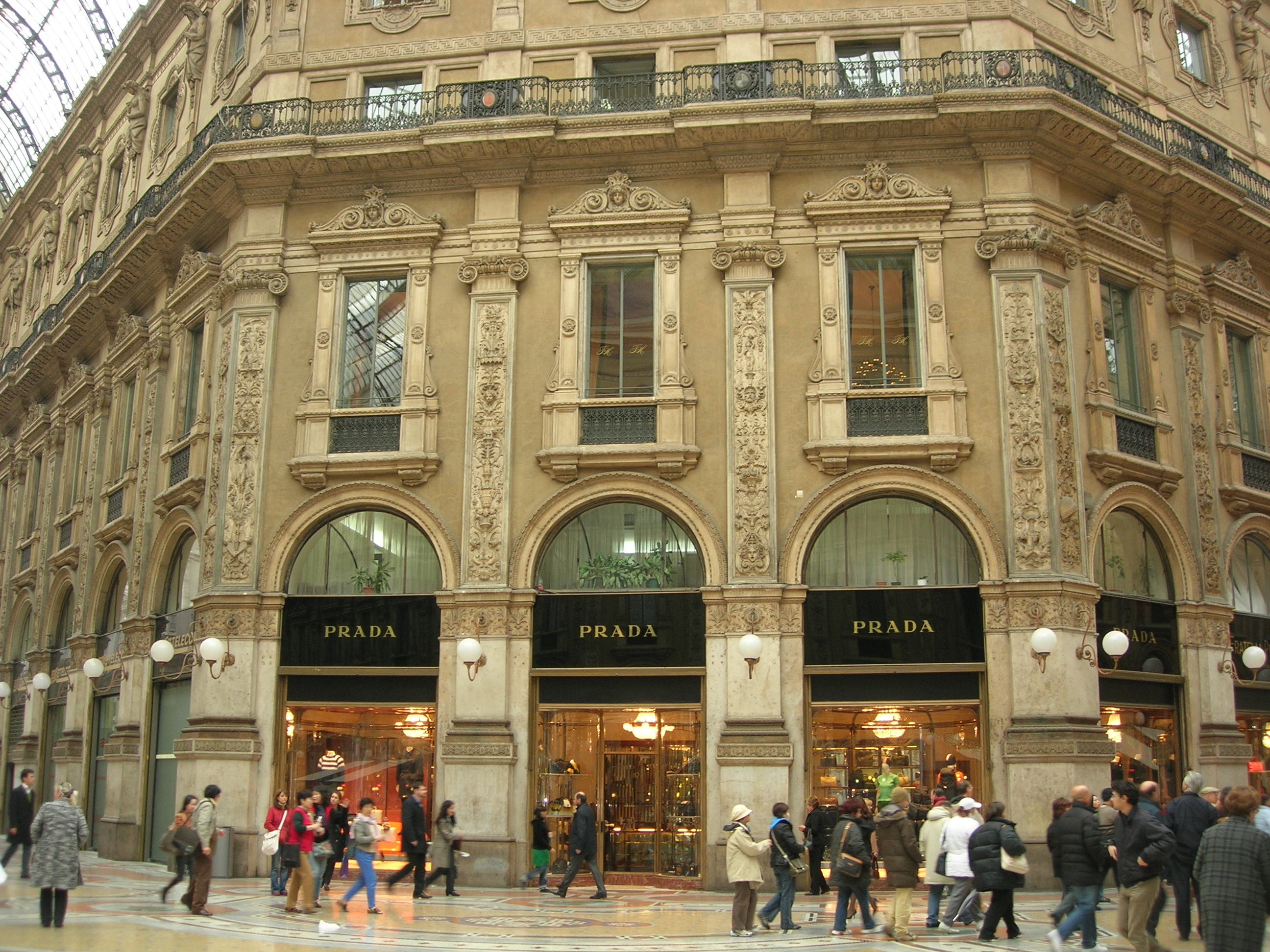
Prada shop in Milan

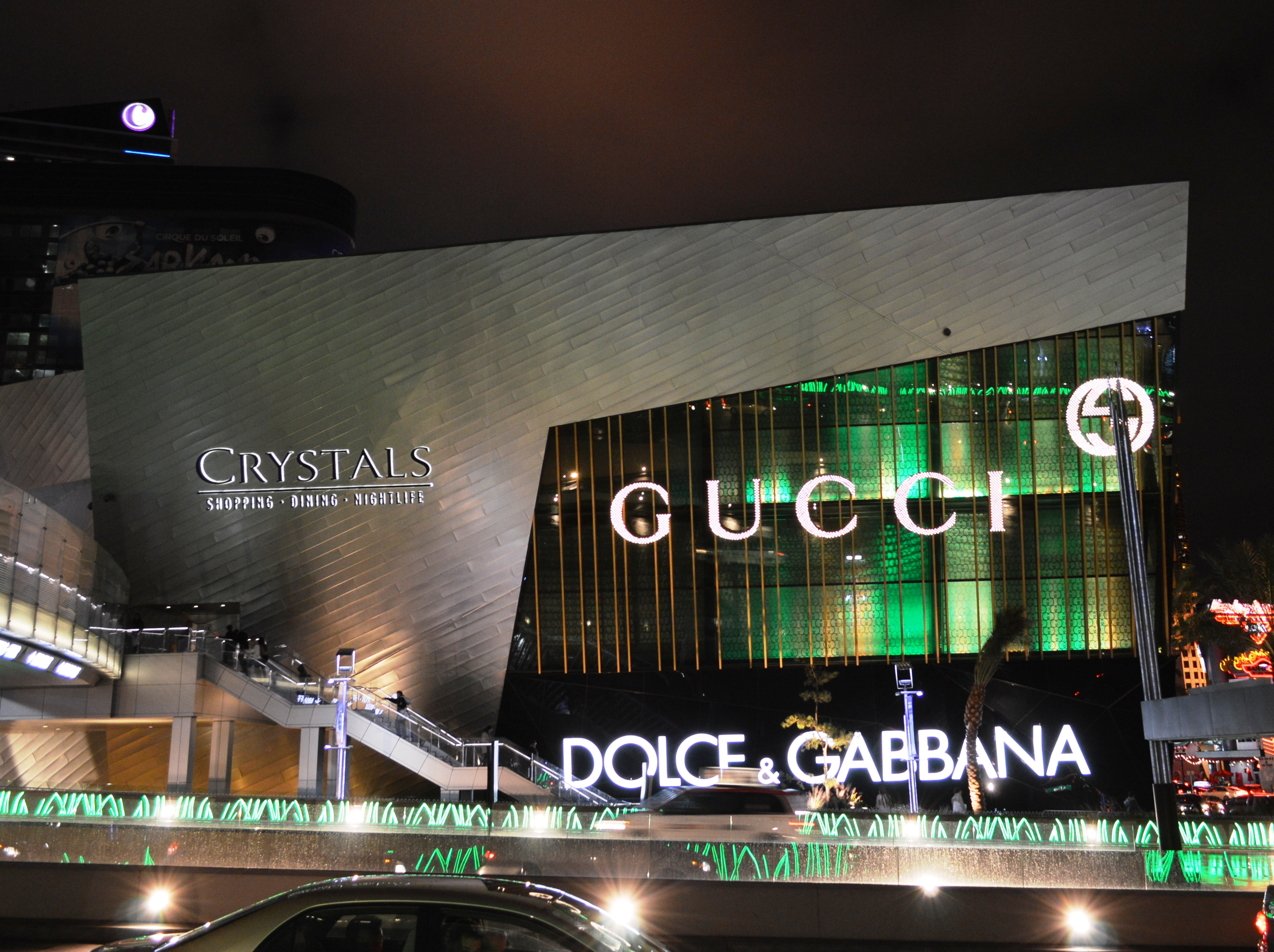
Gucci and Dolce & Gabbana Store on the Las Vegas Strip

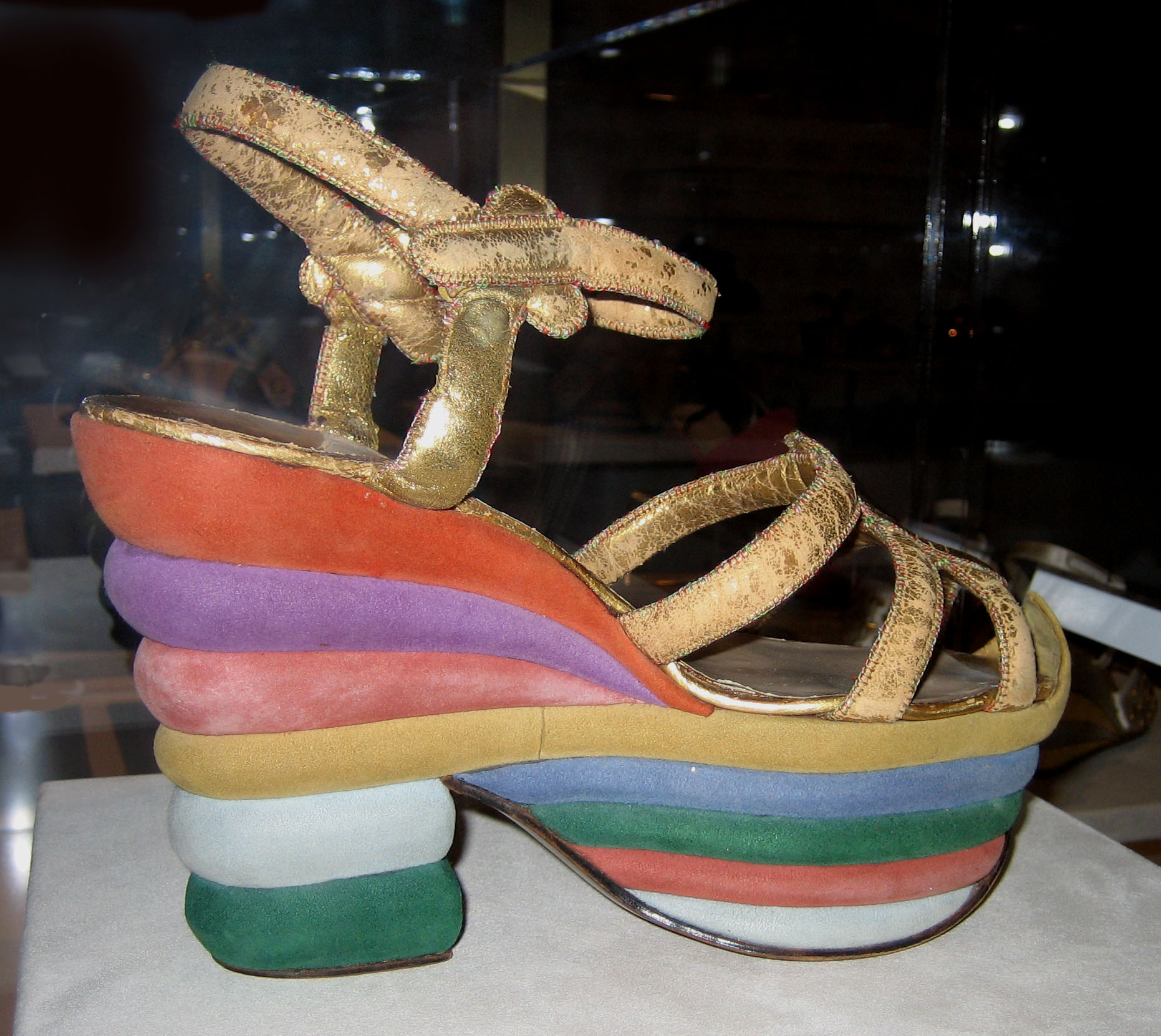
Model of shoe called "zeppa" created in 1938 by Salvatore Ferragamo for Judy Garland

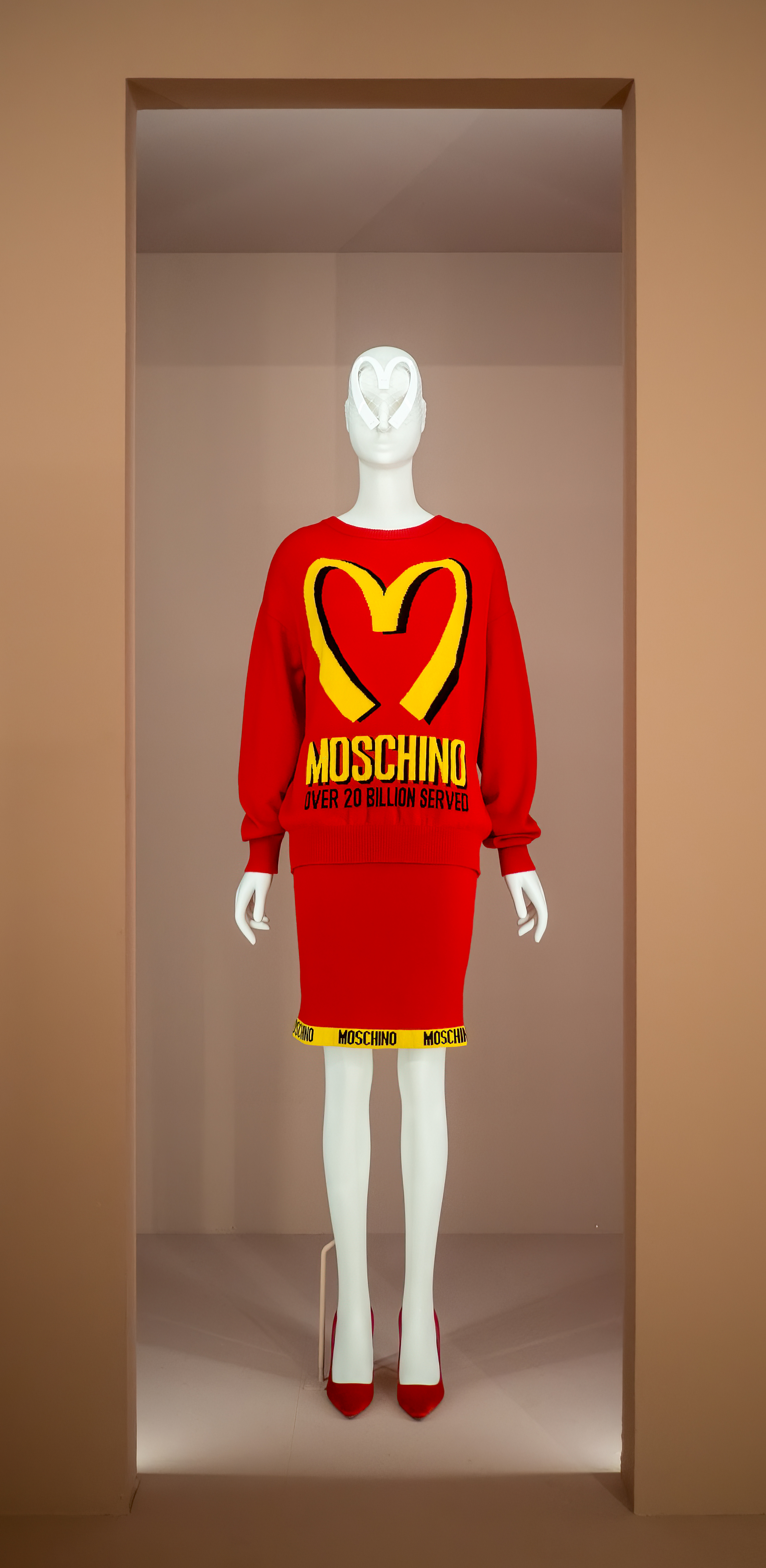
Moschino fall 2014 ready-to-wear designed by Jeremy Scott

== Modern history ==
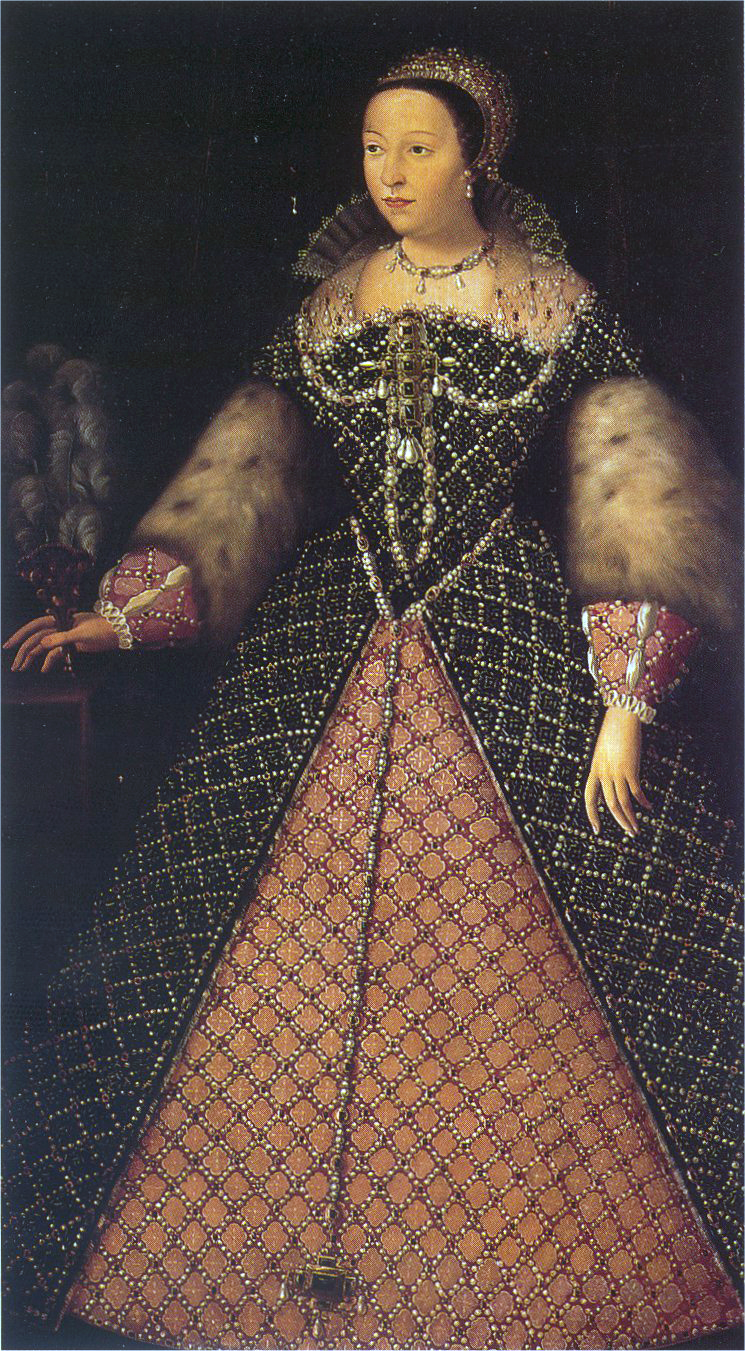
The Italian Catherine de' Medici, as Queen of France. Her fashions were the main trendsetters of courts at the time.

Since the 11th century, Italy has played a leading role in the European fashion industry. This is due to the rise of powerful cities such as Venice, Milan, Florence, Naples, Vicenza, and Rome, which began to produce a wide range of goods, including robes, jewelry, textiles, shoes, fabrics, ornaments, and elaborate dresses. Italian fashion reached its peak during the Renaissance, a period widely recognized as having originated in Italy, which brought remarkable advancements in various fields, including art, music, education, finance, and philosophy. It was during this era that Italian fashion designs became very popular, particularly among the Medicis in Florence. The fashions of Queen Catherine de' Medici of France were considered among the most fashionable in Europe. After a period of decline from the 17th to the mid-20th century, Italy returned to being a leading nation in fashion, and Florence was Italy's fashion capital in the 1950s and 1960s from the very first high fashion parade at the Sala Bianca of the Pitti Palace.

In 1952, with names such as Emilio Schuberth, Emilio Pucci, Vincenzo Ferdinandi, Roberto Capucci, Sorelle Fontana, Germana Marucelli, Mila Schön, Fausto Sarli, whilst Milan led the way in the 1970s and 1980s, with then-new labels and designers such as Walter Albini, Armani, Enrico Coveri, Dolce & Gabbana, Gianfranco Ferré, Fiorucci, Romeo Gigli, Krizia, Missoni, Moschino, Luciano Soprani, Trussardi and Versace and opening up and setting up their first boutiques and emporia. Until the 1970s, Italian fashion was mainly designed for the rich and famous, more or less like the French "Haute Couture". From Audrey Hepburn to Grace Kelly, Hollywood stars chose Italian designs, helping to bring Made in Italy to the global stage. In the 1970s and 1980s, Italian fashion started to concentrate on ready-to-wear clothes, such as coats, jackets, trousers, shirts, jeans, jumpers and miniskirts. The 1980s were years in which consumerism became a global phenomenon and advertising became more and more invasive, in which the obsession with physical form was rampant and the "culture of appearance" also invaded fashion, which experienced one of the most eclectic periods in its history. Milan became more affordable and stylish for shoppers and home to the most desired names such as Giorgio Armani and Gianni Versace, while Florence was deposed of its position as the Italian fashion capital and replaced by Rome, which grew in importance as a high fashion pole in the country thanks to the creations of Valentino, Fendi, Roberto Capucci, Renato Balestra and Gattinoni. In the 1990s, fashion was about contamination of styles that took inspiration from different worlds and that gave birth to a casualwear whose iconic items were high-waisted jeans, slip dresses, colourful sweatshirts and checked shirts with Miuccia Prada inventing the "ugly-chic" style which changed the rules in aesthetics.

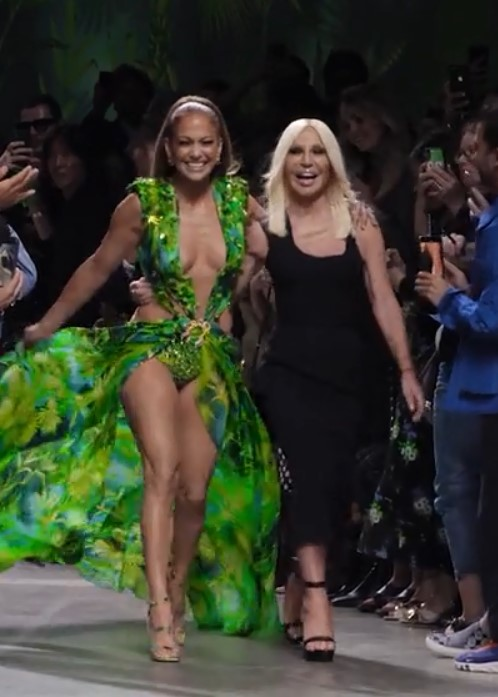
Donatella Versace with Jennifer Lopez wearing the Jungle dress in 2019

Italian fashion's relevance transcends decades and in the early 2000s can be confirmed by former Google CEO Eric Schmidt revealing that the invention of Google images was due to the incredibly high number of searches for photos of the Versace's jungle print dress worn by Jennifer Lopez at Grammys in 2000. Today, Milan and Rome are Italy's fashion capitals, and major international centres for fashion design, competing with other cities such as Tokyo, Los Angeles, London, Paris and New York. Also, other cities such as Venice, Florence, Naples, Vicenza, Bologna, Genoa and Turin are important centres. The country's main shopping districts are the Via Montenapoleone fashion district and the Galleria Vittorio Emanuele (Milan), Via dei Condotti (Rome), and Via de' Tornabuoni (Florence).

== Cities ==
Italian fashion is dominated by Milan, Rome, and to a lesser extent, Florence, with the former two being included in the top 30 fashion capitals of the world.

=== Milan ===
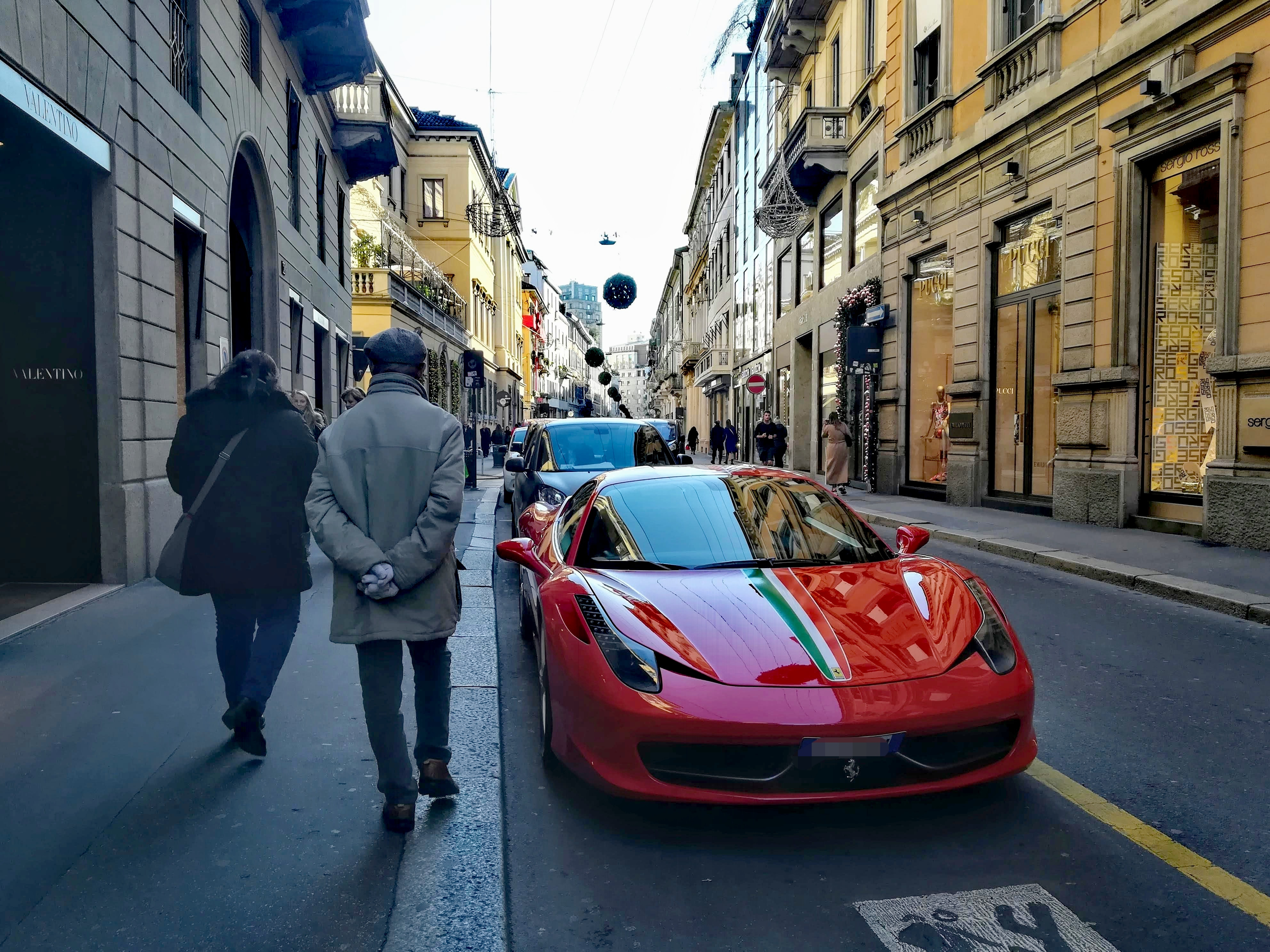
Via Montenapoleone during the Christmas period

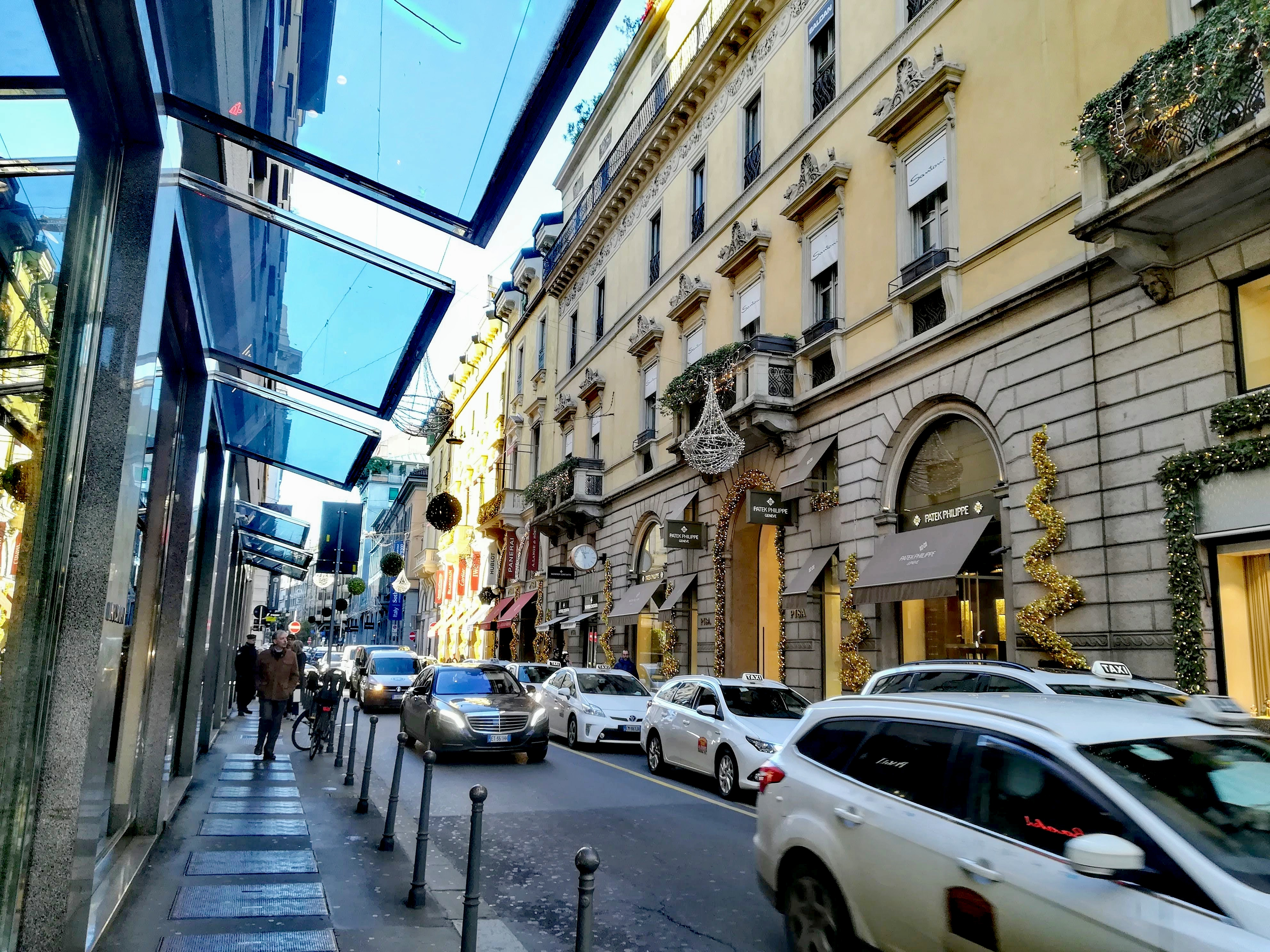
Elegant luxury shops, during the Christmas period, along Via Pietro Verri nearby Via Montenapoleone

Many of the major Italian fashion brands, such as Versace, Prada, Armani, Dolce & Gabbana, Marni, Antonio Marras, Missoni, Moncler, Moschino, Etro, and Zegna are currently headquartered in the city. International fashion labels also operate shops in Milan, including a Louis Vuitton flagship store. Milan also hosts a fashion week twice a year, just like other international centres such as Paris, London and New York. Milan's main upscale fashion district is the "Quadrilatero della moda" (literally, "Fashion quadrilateral"), where the city's most prestigious shopping streets (Via Montenapoleone, Via della Spiga, Via Sant'Andrea, Via Manzoni and Corso Venezia) are held. The Galleria Vittorio Emanuele II, the Piazza del Duomo, Via Dante and Corso Buenos Aires are other important shopping streets and squares. According to the 2024 Main Streets Across the World report, by the real estate group Cushman & Wakefield, Milan's Via Montenapoleone was named the world's most expensive shopping street, beating New York's Fifth Avenue, London's New Bond Street and Paris's Champs-Élysées, and becoming the first European city to top the list in 34 years.

=== Florence ===
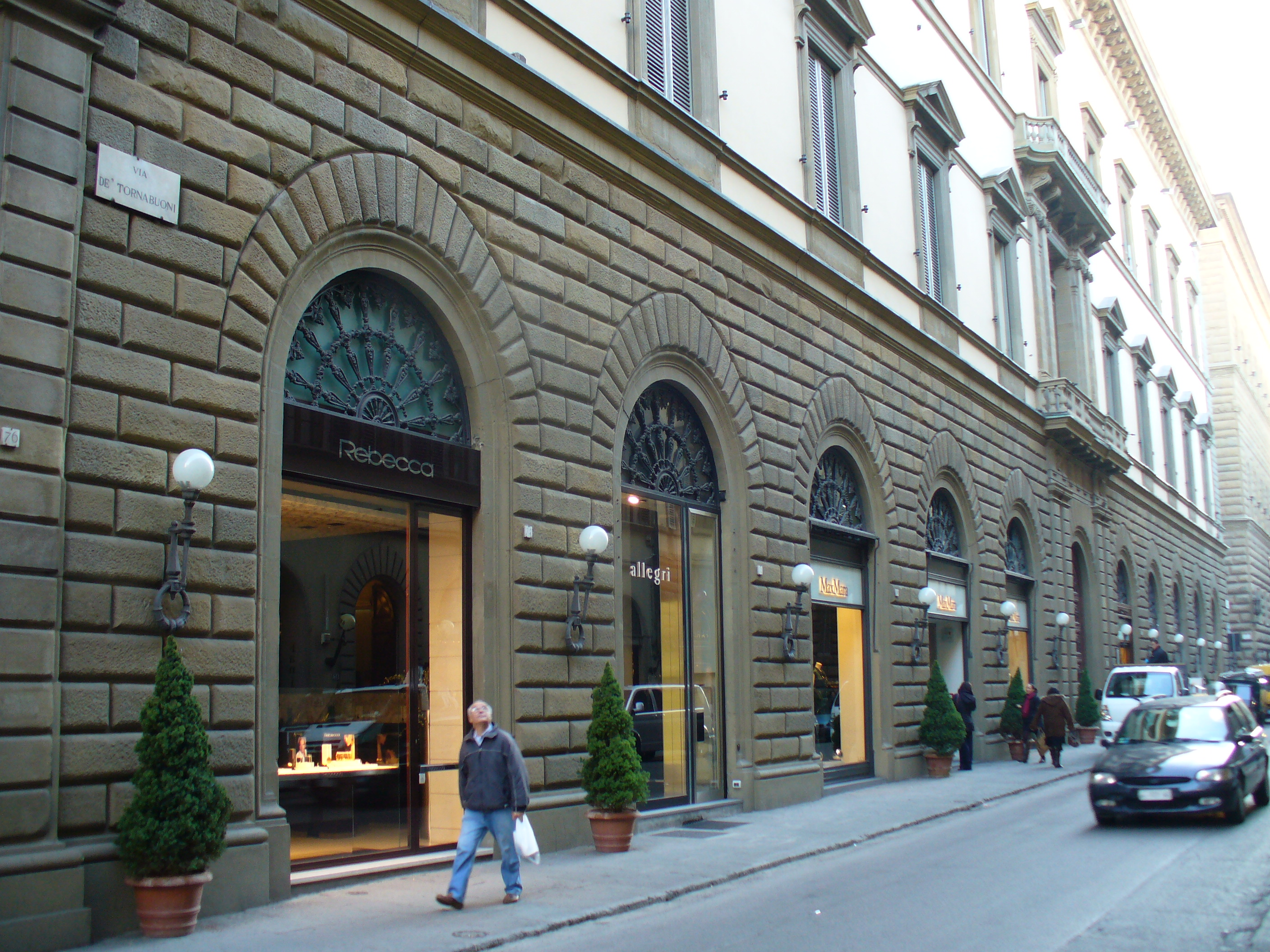
Luxury boutiques along Florence's Via de' Tornabuoni

In 1951, businessman Giovanni Battista Giorgini organized in his villa in Florence a private Italian fashion show, which was followed on 24 July 1952 by a fully-fledged fashion show organized in the Sala Bianca of the Palazzo Pitti, today considered the first contemporary Italian fashion show. Florence has served as the home of the Italian fashion company Salvatore Ferragamo since 1928. Gianfranco Lotti, Gucci, Roberto Cavalli, Ermanno Scervino, Stefano Ricci, Patrizia Pepe, Enrico Coveri and Emilio Pucci were also founded and most of them are still headquartered in Florence. Other major players in the fashion industry such as Prada and Chanel have large offices and stores in Florence or its outskirts. Florence's main upscale shopping street is Via de' Tornabuoni, where major luxury fashion houses and jewelry labels, such as Armani and Bulgari, have their elegant boutiques. Via del Parione and Via Roma are other streets that are also well known for their high-end fashion stores.

=== Rome ===
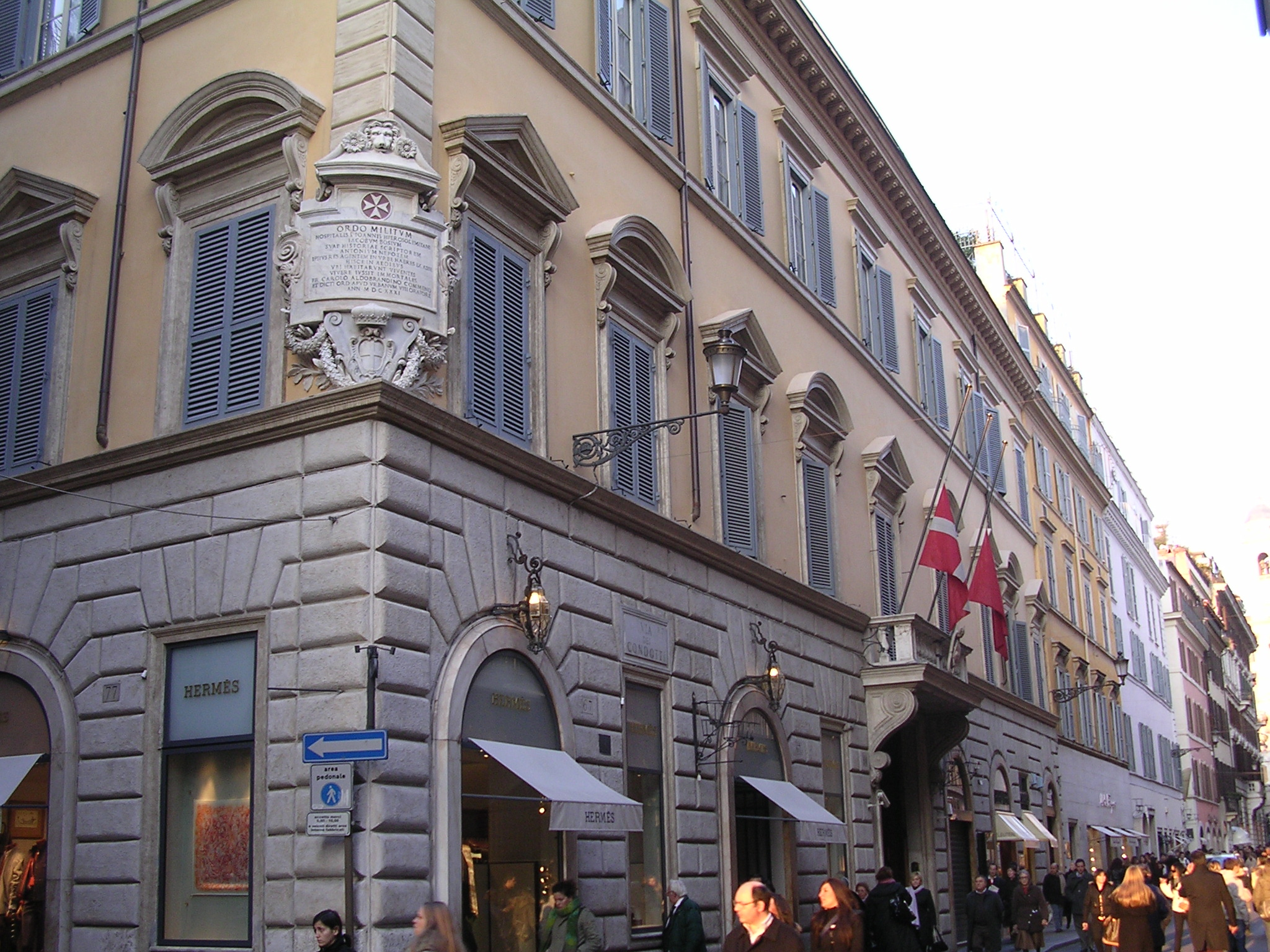
The Palazzo di Malta, surrounded by Hermès boutiques in Via Condotti, Rome's main upscale shopping street

Rome is widely recognized as a world fashion capital. Major Italian luxury fashion houses and jewelry chains, such as Valentino, Bulgari, Fendi, Laura Biagiotti, Gattinoni and Brioni, just to name a few, are headquartered in or were founded in the city. Also, other major labels, such as Chanel, Prada, Dolce & Gabbana, Armani and Versace have luxury boutiques in Rome, primarily along its prestigious and upscale Via dei Condotti. Rome Fashion Week is an important global showcase.

=== Other cities ===
Although Milan, Rome and Florence are commonly regarded as the leading cities in Italian fashion, other cities, such as Venice, Vicenza, Prato, Turin, Naples and Bologna, are also important centres for Italian clothing design and industry. Venice, for instance, is the home of Italian fashion house Roberta di Camerino, which was founded in 1945. The brand is famous for its handbags, and is most notably associated with the creation of the it bag, a form of handbag which is recognisable due to its status symbol.

Brands such as Max Mara and United Colors of Benetton, despite being major Italian brands, are not headquartered in Milan, Rome or Florence, yet, the former has its headquarters in Reggio Emilia, and the latter in Ponzano Veneto. Italian holding OTB held by Renzo Rosso, owner of different ready-to-wear brands such as Diesel and also fashion houses like Marni, Dutch label Viktor & Rolf and Belgian Maison Margiela, is headquartered in the countryside near Vicenza in the region of Veneto. Italian companies Cesare Paciotti and also Tod's, owned by businessman Diego Della Valle (which produces luxury shoes, other leather goods and also clothes under the labels of Tod's itself, Roger Vivier, Hogan, Fay and haute couture brand Schiaparelli), Santoni, Bontoni are headquartered in the region of Marche, a very important manufacturing district for shoes and leather components in the Adriatic coast. Fashion houses Fabiana Filippi and Brunello Cucinelli's home is the region of Umbria and luxury brands Kiton and Harmont & Blaine were founded in Naples, which is also another prominent area of the country for the manufacturing of apparel and accessories (especially shoes and leather goods in general around the district of Solofra).

== Fashion shows and fairs ==
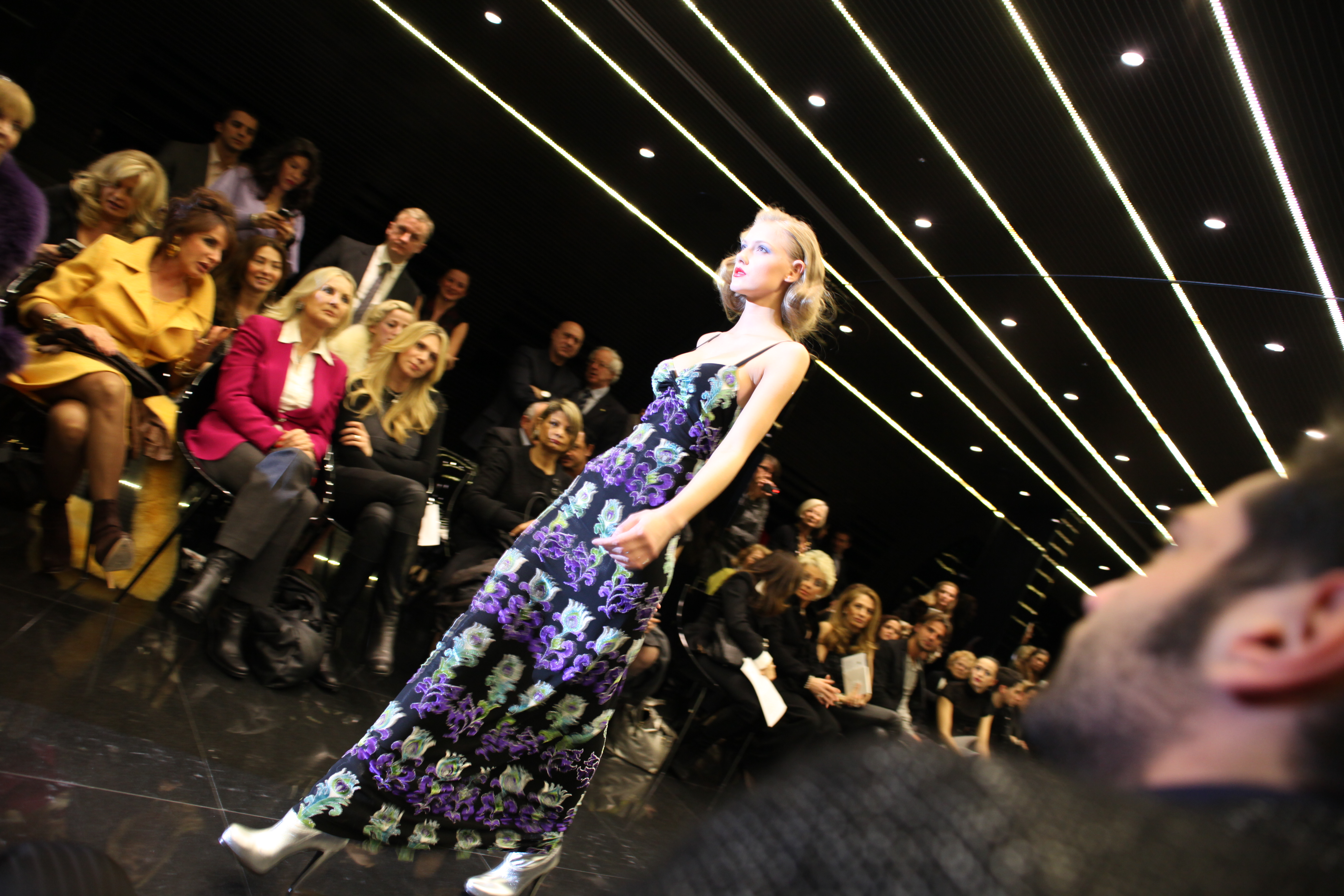
Milan Fashion Week

The Milan Fashion Week takes place twice a year after the London Fashion Week and before the Paris Fashion Week. It is scheduled as the third of the four most important and global international ready-to-wear fashion weeks of the calendar during the so-called fashion month. Dates are determined by the Camera Nazionale della Moda Italiana. Some of the locations where fashion shows are held are Milan's Palazzo Reale, Palazzo Serbelloni, Padiglione Visconti, Spazio delle Cavallerizze at Leonardo da Vinci museum and many others. Another prominent platform for men's collections and new projects in fashion industry is Pitti Immagine in Florence at the Fortezza da Basso, held twice a year.
