= Gattinoni (surname) =

Gattinoni is an Italian surname. Notable people with this surname include:

- Federico Gattinoni (born 1984), Italian rower
- Fernanda Gattinoni (1926-2022), Italian fashion designer, founder of the Gattinoni atelier
- Mauro Gattinoni (born 1977), Italian politician

== See also ==
- Gattinoni
- Gatti
