= Ermanno Scervino =

Italian fashion house

- Company type: Private
- Industry: Fashion
- Founded: 2000 in Florence
- Founder: Ermanno Daelli & Toni Scervino
- Headquarters: Florence, Italy
- Brands: Ermanno Scervino, Ermanno Scervino Lingerie and Beachwear, Ermanno Scervino Junior, Scervino Street
- Parent: Dernamaria SRL
- Website: www.ermannoscervino.com

Ermanno Scervino is an Italian fashion house headquartered in Florence, Italy. Entrepreneur Toni Scervino and designer Ermanno Daelli founded the fashion label in 2000.

== History ==
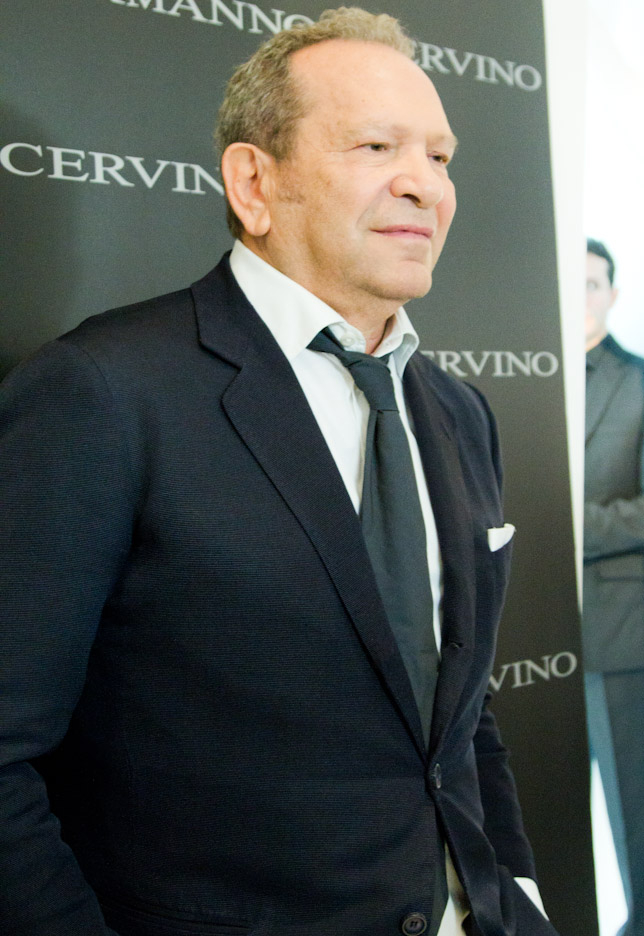
The designer in 2011

In 2000, Toni Scervino and Ermanno Daelli founded the fashion brand Ermanno Scervino. Ermanno Daelli launched his own label after living in New York City, where he met Andy Warhol.

The fashion line's women's collection debuted at Milan Fashion Week in 2003 with the Fall/Winter 2003/04 collection. The men's collection was launched in 2002 and made its first appearance as the guest of honor at Pitti Immagine in 2005. The first runway debut for the men's collection was in Milan during the Men's Fashion Week in 2008. In addition to a men's and women's ready to wear collection, in 2004, the Ermanno Scervino Junior collection was created.

In 2007, the Ermanno Scervino Lingerie and Beachwear line was created in partnership with ViaMazzini, who distributes and produces the collections. The lingerie collection was launched in the fall/winter 2008-09 campaign and the beachwear collection was launched in the spring/summer 2009 campaign.

In 2013, Ermanno Scervino launched Scervino Street, a line of leather accessories, as a license with ABC Spa Company. That January, Ermanno Daelli was the guest of honor of the 83rd edition of Pitti Immagine uomo. He presented the fashion line's men's collection and the women's pre-collection during the event in the context of the Salone dei Cinquecento in Palazzo Vecchio, the town hall of Florence.

In June 2014, to mark the Firenze Hometown of Fashion (Pitti Immagine Uomo 86) initiative, Ermanno Scervino celebrated the 60th anniversary of the Centro di Firenze per la Moda Italiana, presenting the first Men's and Women's no season collection at Forte Belvedere. In September 2014, Ermanno Scervino hosted the closing gala dinner for the Celebrity Fight Night Foundation, which raises money for local charities through a celebrity charity event.

== Operations ==
The company is headquartered in Grassina in Bagno a Ripoli, a region surrounding Florence, Italy. The headquarters house Ermmano Scervino's designer style offices, research labs, production workshops and administrative and commercial divisions. In April 2014, Ermanno Scervino had over 500 international points of sale, including 39 stores worldwide. It employs about 1200 workers worldwide. The company only manufactures its products in Italy.

== Brands ==
=== Ermanno Scervino ===
Ermanno Scervino is the core brand and includes women's and men's ready-to-wear and accessories collections.

=== Ermanno Scervino Lingerie and Beachwear ===
The company launched its lingerie collection for its fall/winter 2008-09 campaign. The beachwear collection was launched for its spring/summer 2009 campaign.

=== Ermanno Scervino Junior ===
The line includes a variety of clothing and accessories for girls that takes its inspiration from the adult's wardrobe

=== Scervino Street ===
Scervino Street represents a line of handbags, hoodies and jackets targeted at a younger clientele.

== Advertising campaigns ==
Over the years Ermanno Scervino has had international testimonials including Helena Christensen, Malgosia Bela, Bianca Balti, Teodora Richards, Alice Dellal, Jessica Miller, Dree Hemingway, Asia Argento, and Lindsey Wixson. The brand also collaborated with international photographers including Peter Lindbergh, Mario Sorrenti, Patrick Demarchelier, Paolo Roversi, and Francesco Carrozzini.

== See also ==
- Italian fashion
- Category:Clothing brands of Italy
