= Sasuphi =

Fashion brand

Sasuphi is an Italian fashion label founded in 2021 by Sara Ferrero and Susanna Cucco.

== History ==
Ferrero and Cucco founded their label in 2021 with a small all-female team. The name was derived from SA (Sara), SU (Susanna), and PHI, the golden ratio, and is a play on the French "ça suffit", or "that's enough". Their founding principle was to "express individuality without fashion dependency”. Each founder had over 20 years of industry experience, including Ferrero's as CEO of Valextra and Cucco's at her art direction agency Studio Cucco. Ferrero had brought Valextra's leather luxury brand into the social media realm.

Ferrero and Cucco met in London at the fashion label Joseph when Ferrero was CEO, and then later at Valextra. They told a reporter their studio's location in Milan provided design inspiration from the distinctive 20th-century architecture in the city.

In 2024, Harrods brought on Sasuphi as part of a women's wear expansion along with other newer brands Wolk Morais and Nomadissem.

In 2026, Vogue noted that Sasuphi's trait of “women designing for women” had become a major trend in the past year, with Louise Trotter, Maria Grazia Chiuri and Meryll Rogge taking leadership roles at Bottega Veneta, Fendi and Marni respectively.

Sasuphi's Fall 2026 show during Milan Fashion Week was themed around "The Architecture of Femininity".

Fashion critic Jacob Gallagher described Sasuphi's knit firefighter's helmet as "charmingly absurd".
