= Akmal =

Akmal is a given name and surname of Arabic origin. Notable people with the name include:

== Given name ==
- Akmal al-Din al-Babarti (died 1384), Egyptian Hanafi scholar, jurist, scholastic Maturidi theologian, mufassir, muhaddis, grammarian, eloquent orator, and author
- Akmal Azmi (born 1998), Malaysian footballer
- Akmal Bakhtiyarov (born 1998), Kazakhstani footballer
- Akmal bin Azman (born 2000), Singaporean footballer
- Akmal Saif Chatha (born 1973), Pakistani politician
- Akmal Nor Hasrin (born 1995), Malaysian archer
- Akmal Ikramov (1898–1938), Uzbekistani politician
- Akmal Irgashev (born 1982), Uzbekistani taekwondo practitioner
- Akmal Khan (1929–1967), Pakistani actor and singer
- Akmal Kholmatov (born 1976), Tajikistani footballer
- Akmal Mozgovoy (born 2000), Uzbekistani footballer
- Akmal Murodov (born 1996), Tajikistani judoka
- Akmal Nasrullah Mohd Nasir (born 1986), Malaysian politician
- Akmal Rizal Ahmad Rakhli (born 1981), Malaysian footballer
- Akmal Saburov (born 1987), Tajikistani footballer
- Akmal Saleh (born 1964), Australian comedian and actor
- Akmal Shaikh (1956–2009), British-Pakistani businessman and drug trafficker
- Akmal Shaukat (born 1986), British artist, art director, and magazine editor
- Akmal Shorakhmedov (born 1986), Uzbekistani footballer
- Akmal Tursunbaev (born 1993), Uzbekistani football goalkeeper
- Akmal Zahir (born 1994), Malaysian footballer
- Akmal Hakim Zakaria (born 1996), Malaysian racing cyclist

== Surname ==
- Adnan Akmal (born 1985), Pakistani cricketer
- Kamran Akmal (born 1982), Pakistani cricketer
- Umar Akmal (born 1990), Pakistani cricketer
