= Guillermo Mariotto =

Venezuelan-Italian fashion designer

- Born: Jesús Guillermo Mariotto; 13 April 1966 (age 59); Caracas, Venezuela
- Occupation(s): Fashion designer, TV personality
- Years active: 1983–present
- Awards: Knight of the Order of the Star of Italy

Jesús Guillermo Mariotto (born 13 April 1966) is a Venezuelan-Italian fashion designer and TV personality.

== Early and personal life ==
Born in Caracas to a Venezuelan mother and an Italian father, Guillermo Mariotto has lived for many decades in Rome.

A devout Roman Catholic, he is openly gay.

== Fashion career ==
Mariotto made his debut in 1983, at the age of 17, as a theatrical set designer for Gl'innamorati by Carlo Goldoni, for the company "I Commedianti Italiani", directed by Antonio Pierfederici. The scenes were designed by Mariotto, while the costumes were created by the Farani company. It was set at the Vittoriale degli Italiani in Gardone Riviera, in the last residence of Gabriele D'Annunzio.

Later, he graduated from the California College of Arts and Crafts in San Francisco. To deepen and learn more about art and design, Mariotto embarked on a journey to Europe: Paris, London, Milan. Having joined the style office of Basile, he collaborated for the women's prêt-à-porter collections of the Milanese brand. Later he joined Krizia and Dolce & Gabbana.

Having come into contact with Roman haute couture, in 1988 he met Raniero Gattinoni, engaged in the relaunch of the brand founded by Fernanda Gattinoni in 1946. In 1994, he became creative director of the maison. Among others, he has dressed Raffaella Carrà, Beyoncé and Pope Benedict XVI.

== Filmography ==
- Vacanze di Natale a Cortina, directed by Neri Parenti (2011)

== Television ==
- Ballando con le stelle (Rai 1, since 2005)
- Notti sul ghiaccio (Rai 1, 2006–2007)
- Domenica in... passerella (Rai 1, 2009)
- Miss Italia (Rai 1, 2007, 2009–2010)
- Donna tutto si fa per te (Rai Educational-Rai 3, 2011)
- Ballando on the Road (Rai 1, 2017–2019, 2021)
- The Real (TV8, 2017)
- Domenica in (Rai 1, 2018, 2020)
- Detto fatto (Rai 2, 2019–2020)
- Il cantante mascherato (Rai 1, 2020)
- ItaliaSì! (Rai 1, 2020)
- La vita in diretta (Rai 1, 2020)

== Books ==
- Danzando nell'acqua. Turin: add. 2010. ISBN 978-88-96873-02-1.

== Honours ==
- Italy: Knight of the Order of the Star of Italy (Rome, 9 January 2020)
