= Bianca Balti =

Italian model (born 1984)

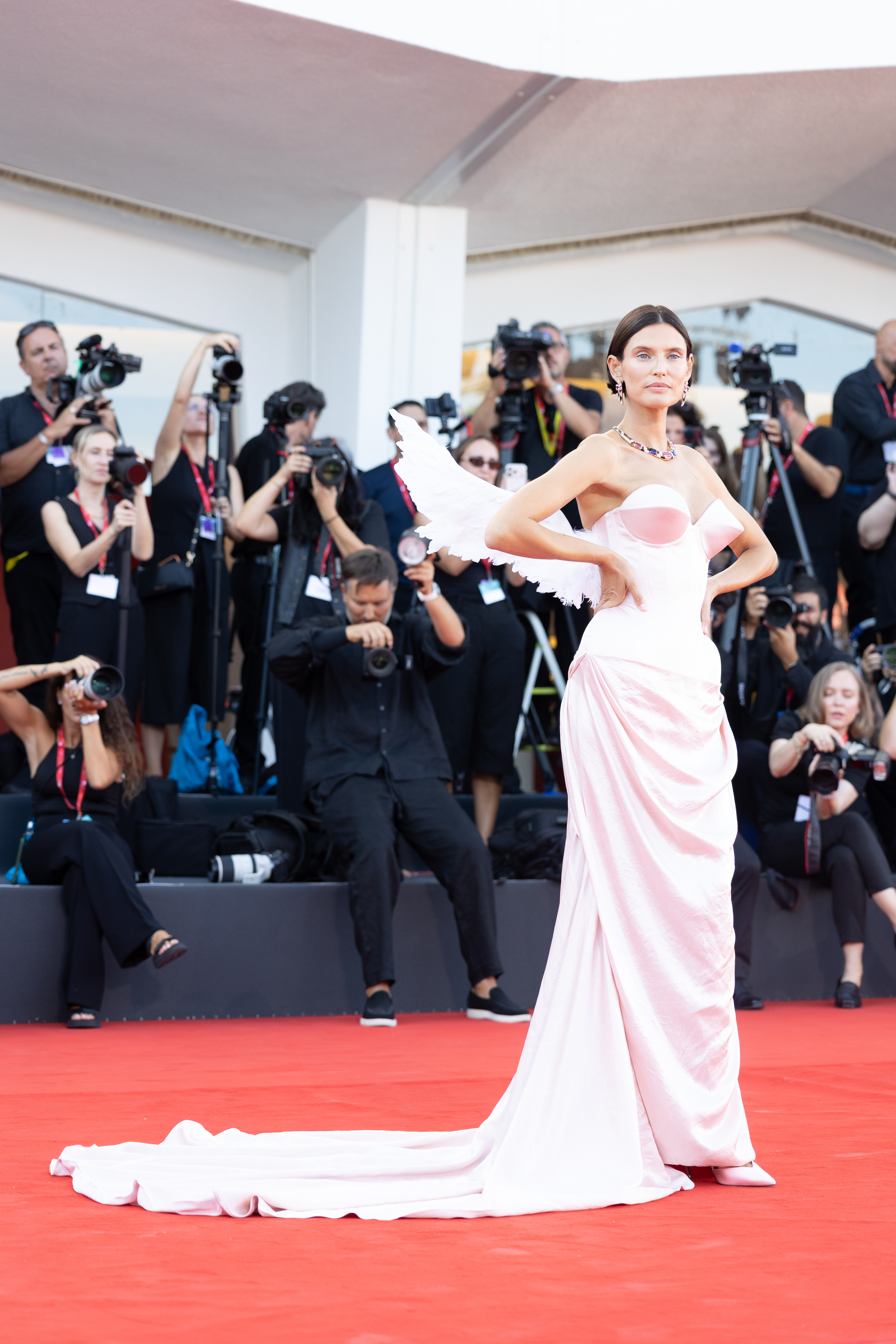
- Bianca Balti in 2026
- Born: 19 March 1984 (age 42); Lodi, Lombardy, Italy
- Occupation: Model
- Spouses: Christian Lucidi (m. 2006; div. 2010) Matthew McRae (m. 2016)
- Children: 2
- Modeling information
- Height: 1.73 m (5 ft 8 in)
- Hair color: Brown
- Eye color: Blue
- Agency: Wilhelmina Models (New York); IMG Models (Paris, Sydney); Brave Model Management (Milan); Storm Management (London); Traffic Models (Barcelona); UNIQUE DENMARK (Copenhagen); Model Management (Hamburg); Stockholmsgruppen (Stockholm)

Bianca Balti (pronounced [ˈbjaŋka ˈbalti]; born 19 March 1984) is an Italian model. She is known for her Dolce & Gabbana campaigns, after being the face of the brand for 10 years.

== Early life ==
Balti was born in Lodi, Lombardy. She is the second child of Bruno Balti and Mariabice Marzani.

== Career ==
Bianca Balti was scouted while she was working as a Promo girl for a shampoo company, and began her career at the age of 20. Her career took off when she was part of the S/S 05 Dolce&Gabbana campaign and went on to work 10 more years with the brand.

Balti was first booked for the cover of L'Officiel, shot by Alexi Lubomirski. Her first notable advertisement campaign came for Dolce & Gabbana. She has appeared on the covers of many fashion magazines, including Vogue, Harper's Bazaar, W, Cosmopolitan and Marie Claire, as well as men's magazine Playboy. Her campaigns include Roberto Cavalli, Donna Karan, Christian Dior, D&G, Valentino, Armani Jeans, Missoni, Rolex, Guess?, Paco Rabanne, Anna Molinari, Guerlain, Revlon, La Perla, Cesare Paciotti, Mango, and Thierry Mugler.

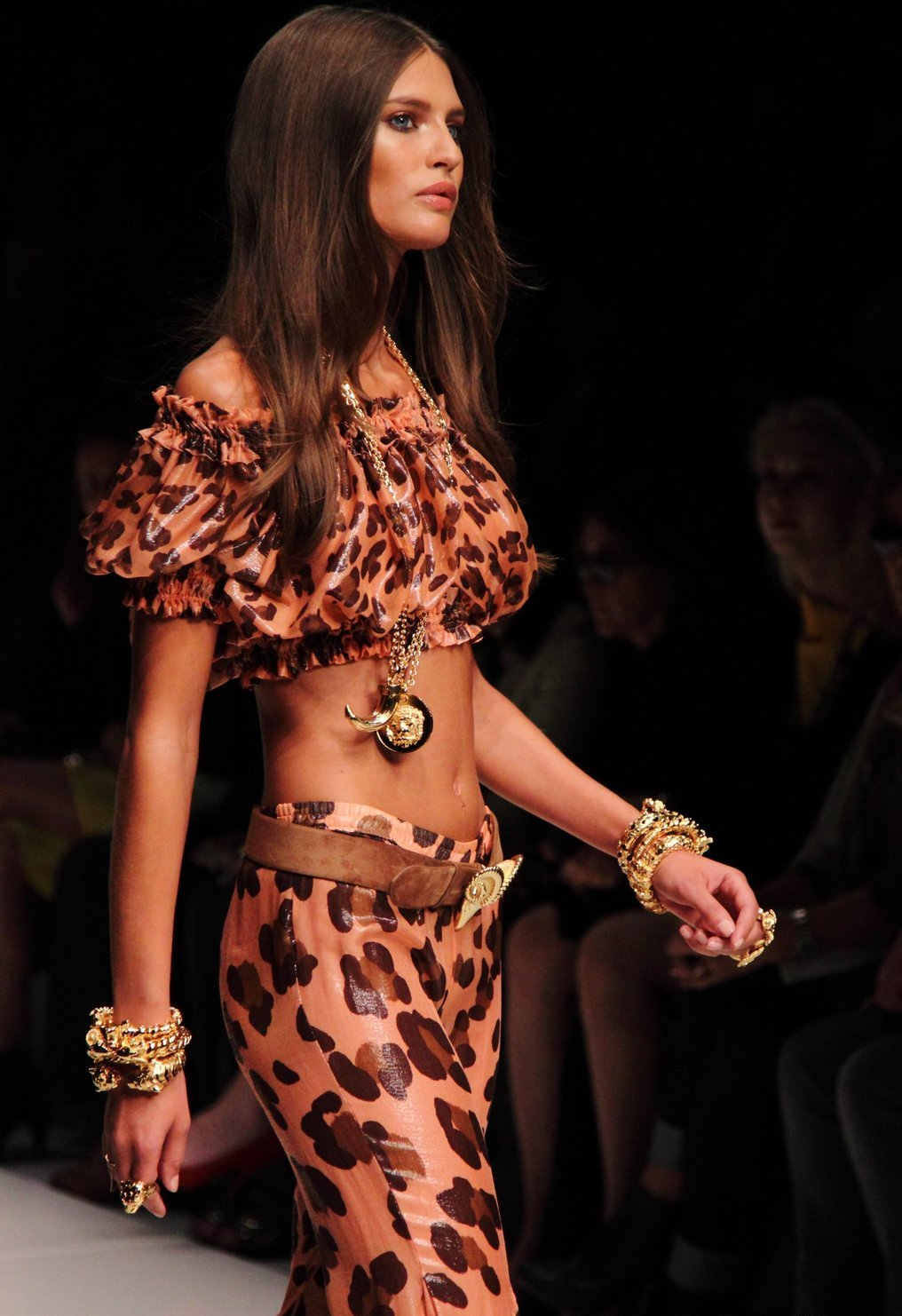
Bianca Balti in 2010

She also appeared in the Victoria's Secret Fashion Show 2005 and in their catalogs.

Since the spring/summer 2005 fashion shows, she has appeared shows for designers such as Shiatzy Chen, Karl Lagerfeld, Gianfranco Ferré, Marc Jacobs, Alexander McQueen, Givenchy, Zac Posen, Hermès, John Galliano, Gucci, Fendi, Prada, Valentino, Missoni, Chanel, Christian Dior, Versace, Oscar de la Renta, Narciso Rodriguez, Ralph Lauren, Carolina Herrera and Victoria's Secret.

Balti was cast in Abel Ferrara's movie Go Go Tales (2008) as one of the erotic dancers. After the movie and her pregnancy, she returned to the catwalk, became the new face of the Cesare Paciotti international campaign, and replaced Angelina Jolie as one of the faces of the fall St. John campaign, with models Hilary Rhoda and Caroline Winberg.

She appears in the 2011 Pirelli Calendar photographed by Karl Lagerfeld. In 2011 she features in Francesco Scognamiglio Spring/Summer 2011 campaign art directed by Akmal Shaukat photographed by Giampaolo Sgura. In 2012 she was chosen as the new face for Dolce & Gabbana together with actress Monica Bellucci. She became the face of their Light Blue fragrance in 2013.

She also worked as a TV presenter, hosting BeastMasters for Italy in 2018. She co-hosted the second night of the Sanremo Music Festival 2025 alongside Cristiano Malgioglio, Nino Frassica and Carlo Conti.

== Personal life ==
Balti was married to Italian photographer Christian Lucidi, with whom she had a daughter, Matilde, in 2007. They divorced in 2010.

On 14 April 2015, she gave birth to her second daughter Mia McRae with her American boyfriend Matthew McRae, whom she had met while vacationing in Marbella, Spain. They got married at the Fullerton courthouse on 1 August 2016. A year later, she and Matthew McRae renewed their vows in front of family and friends on 1 August 2017.

In 2022, she underwent a preventive double mastectomy surgery after discovering that she carried a variant of the BRCA1 gene. In September 2024, she revealed that she had started chemotherapy for ovarian cancer.
