= Santoni (brand) =

Italian fashion brand

Santoni S.p.A.
- Company type: Private
- Industry: Fashion
- Founded: 1975
- Founder: Andrea Santoni
- Headquarters: Corridonia, Marche, Italy
- Key people: Giuseppe Santoni
- Products: Luxury shoes, leather goods

Santoni S.p.A. is an Italian fashion brand of luxury shoes founded in 1975 by Andrea Santoni. Santoni is headquartered in Corridonia, in the Marche region, an area known for shoemaking along the Adriatic Sea coast.

In the 1990's, under the leadership of Giuseppe Santoni, the company expanded internationally, entering various foreign markets. The brand is carried at directly owned retail stores and Nordstrom, Neiman Marcus and Bergdorf Goodman. Santoni has collaborated with IWC Schaffhausen in creating leather watch straps. Santoni participates in the Italian luxury brand collective Altagamma, which promotes Italian brands in design, fashion, food, jewelry, and other industries.

== See also ==
- Zegna
- Ferragamo
- Tod's
- Bottega Veneta
