= Bernhard Pollini =

German tenor

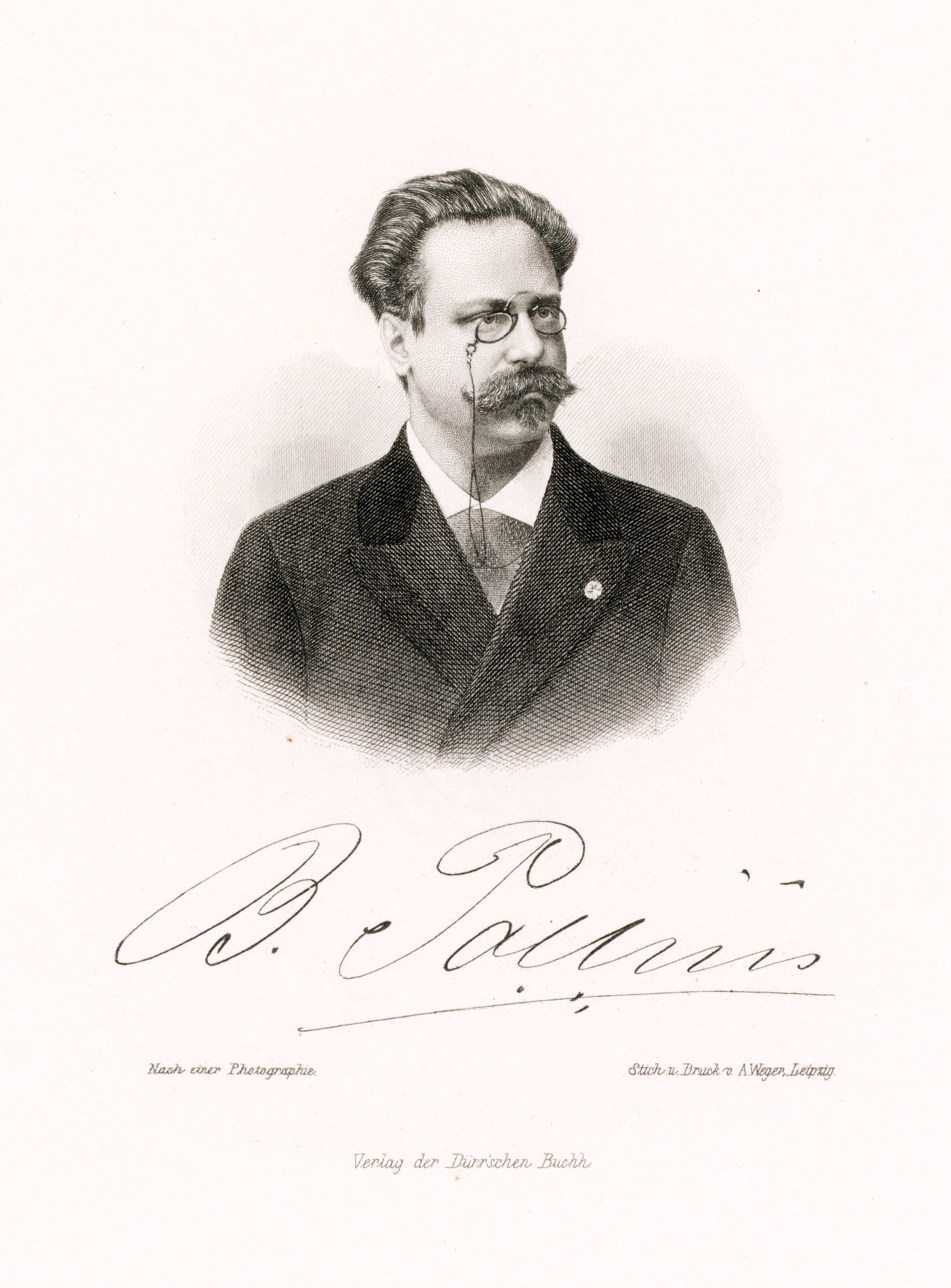
Bernhard Pollini, copper engraving by August Weger

Bernhard Pollini, real name Baruch Pohl, (16 December 1838 – 26 November 1897) was a German operatic tenor, and opera director.

== Early life ==
Born in Cologne, Pollini came from a strictly Jewish family living in very modest circumstances and was actually called Baruch Pohl. He attended grammar school and then worked for a merchant before he made his debut in 1857 in his native town as Lord Arturo Talbo in the opera I puritani by Bellini. He changed to baritone, and in the autumn of 1865, he joined an Italian opera company of which he became impresario. This was the beginning of his career as one of the most important opera directors of his time.

== Career ==
He sang at the Anhaltisches Theater and in the years 1860 and 1861 at the Latvian National Opera. In 1864, he became director of the Lviv Theatre of Opera and Ballet and then went to St Petersburg and Moscow for a few years, where he was chief impresario of the Italian Opera. In 1874, he became director of the Hamburg State Opera and from 1876, he also directed the Altonaer Theater and from 1894 also the Thalia Theater. Four times a week, he presented opera, twice drama, once operetta or ballet and was so successful that he achieved full houses and handsome surpluses. He brought 175 premieres, 51 of which were world premieres, to the stage and continued his work as opera director until his death.

He engaged important singers and conductors, to whom he paid high fees, to the Hamburg Opera and thus brought it to a high artistic level. Well-known composers such as Puccini and Tchaikovsky were engaged to conduct their own works and, in 1891, Pollini appointed Gustav Mahler as successor to Hans von Bülow as first Kapellmeister at his house. Together with him, he organised a guest performance of his ensemble at the Covent Garden Opera in London, where Richard Wagner's Ring of the Nibelung and other operas were performed under Mahler's direction.

In 1888, he became a citizen of Hamburg and was granted the right by the Senate to bear the artist name Pollini. In 1894, Pollini married the soprano Bianca Bianchi, who, from then on, sang as primadonna in Hamburg. Other important singers that Pollini brought to Hamburg included Albert Niemann (tenor), Katharina Klafsky and Anna von Mildenburg.

== Death ==
Immediately after a Meistersinger performance, Pollini died of heart paralysis. He was 58.

== Trivia ==
Pollini made no compromises in the pursuit of his goals as opera director and pushed Gustav Mahler, for example, to the limits of his capabilities. In the 1894/95 season, Mahler conducted 126 evenings at the Stadt-Theater and a further 23 in Altona, and took over the direction of subscription concerts for the late Hans von Bülow. A permanent war between Mahler and Pollini was the result, until they separated a few months before Pollini's death in 1897.

In 1877, the enterprising Pollini negotiated with Richard Wagner for the performance rights to Die Walküre, which was considered the most popular opera in the Ring cycle, but Wagner was not permitted to do so. The impresario thereupon negotiated with Wagner for the entire cycle, but insisted on starting with "Die Walküre". Wagner resigned and twice gave Pollini the advice to perform the cycle in the intended order for better understanding. Pollini did not heed this advice and so the cyclus began on 30 March 1878 with the premiere of the Walküre.
