= Pollini =

Pollini is a surname. It may refer to:

== People ==
- Bernhard Pollini (Baruch Pohl) (1838–1897), German opera director and tenor
- Francesco Pollini (1762–1846), Italian pianist and composer
- Gino Pollini (1903–1991), Italian architect, father of Maurizio
- John Pollini (born 1945), American professor of Art History and History at the University of Southern California
- Maurizio Pollini (1942–2024), Italian classical pianist
- Renato Pollini (1925–2010), Italian politician and mayor

== Businesses ==
- Pollini (fashion house), Italian leather company founded in 1953.
