= Francesco Risso =

Italian fashion designer

- Born: Near the Ligurian coast, Genoa, Italy
- Education: Polimoda; Fashion Institute of Technology; Central Saint Martins
- Occupation: Fashion designer
- Years active: 2008–present
- Label(s): Marni (2016–2025); GU (2026–present); Bureau of Imagination (2026–present)

Francesco Risso is an Italian fashion designer. He was the creative director of the luxury fashion house Marni from 2016 to 2025. He leads an ongoing design collaboration with UNIQLO, was appointed creative director of the retail brand GU in January 2026, and is the founder of the Milan-based design studio Bureau of Imagination.

== Early life and education ==
Risso was born near the Ligurian coast and raised in Genoa. At age 16, he began studying fashion at Polimoda in Florence before transferring to the Fashion Institute of Technology (FIT) in New York. He completed his formal education at Central Saint Martins in London under Louise Wilson.

== Career ==
After attending Polimoda, the fashion school in Florence, he then attended Central Saint Martin in London where he studied under the notorious professor Louise Wilson, who died in 2014.

=== Early career and Prada (2008–2016) ===
Following design roles at Anna Molinari, Alessandro Dell’Acqua, and Malo, Risso joined Prada in 2008, where he worked on womenswear and special projects.

=== Marni (2016–2025) ===
In 2016, Risso succeeded founder Consuelo Castiglioni as creative director of Marni. During his tenure, his collections incorporated upcycled materials and elements of performance art. In 2020, he directed "Marnifesto," a digital presentation for the Spring/Summer 2021 collection during the COVID-19 pandemic.

Risso stepped down from Marni in June 2025, following his final collection for the Autumn/Winter 2025 season. He was succeeded by Belgian designer Meryll Rogge.

=== GU, UNIQLO, and Bureau of Imagination (2026–present) ===
In January 2026, Fast Retailing appointed Risso as the creative director of its GU brand, effective with the Fall/Winter 2026 collection. That same year, he launched the UNIQLO F.RISSO "Made for Dreaming" capsule collection in mid-June 2026.

In April 2026, Risso established Bureau of Imagination (B.O.I) in Milan, a design practice and manufacturing studio for objects and garments. The studio produced a custom garment line under the name "Vestige," which debuted at the 2026 Met Gala when worn by model Paloma Elsesser.

== Educational work ==
Risso has been a guest lecturer at institutions including Polimoda, the Pratt Institute, Savannah College of Art and Design (SCAD), and the Royal Academy of Fine Arts Antwerp.
