= Meryll Rogge =

Belgian fashion designer (born 1984)

- Born: 1984 (age 41–42); Ghent, Belgium
- Education: Université Notre Dame de la Paix; Royal Academy of Fine Arts, Antwerp
- Labels: Meryll Rogge; B.B. Wallace; Marni
- Spouse: Clement Van Vyve
- Children: 2
- Awards: Grand Prize, ANDAM Fashion Awards (2025); Designer of the Year, Belgian Fashion Awards (2024)
- Website: meryllrogge.com

Meryll Rogge (born 1984) is a Belgian fashion designer who has been the creative director of the Italian fashion house Marni since 2025. After seven years on the design team at Marc Jacobs in New York and four years as head of womenswear design at Dries van Noten in Antwerp, she founded her eponymous label in 2020. She launched the knitwear brand B.B. Wallace, named after her sons, in 2025. In 2024 she became the first woman named designer of the year at the Belgian Fashion Awards, and the following year she won the Grand Prize of the ANDAM Fashion Awards.

== Early life and education ==
Rogge was born in 1984 and raised in Ghent, Belgium. As a child she wanted to become an illustrator and work for Disney; after a professor caught her sketching dresses during an Ancient Greek class, he suggested she study fashion instead. Her parents were reluctant about fashion studies, so she made a pact with them under which she first completed a law degree, studying from 2002 to 2004 at the Université Notre Dame de la Paix in Namur, and was then free to pursue fashion. She first applied to the fashion department of the Royal Academy of Fine Arts in Antwerp in 2004 and was not admitted; after a foundation year she entered the bachelor's program in 2005, where Walter Van Beirendonck was among her teachers. She graduated in 2008.

== Career ==
Before starting her own label, Rogge spent seven years at Marc Jacobs in New York and four years at Dries van Noten in Antwerp.

=== Marc Jacobs and Dries van Noten ===
In 2008, while still a student, Rogge began a summer internship at Marc Jacobs in New York and was hired full-time two months before that year's financial crash. She stayed seven years, working her way up to lead designer. In 2014 she returned to Belgium to become head of women's design at Dries van Noten in Antwerp, where she worked closely with Van Noten for four years. After leaving in 2018 she consulted for both houses and helped develop the Dries Van Noten beauty and fragrance line, work that continued until 2025. When Van Noten retired in 2024, Rogge was discussed as a possible successor, though the role went to Julian Klausner.

=== Eponymous label ===
Rogge founded her label in 2020, presenting the first collection that March at a showroom in Le Marais, Paris, ten days before COVID-19 lockdowns began; 35 stores placed orders and all but one stood by them even though the collection was delivered late. She set up her studio in a stone house with a red-tiled roof in Deinze, outside Ghent. The label began showing in Paris through presentations in 2021 and joined the official Paris Fashion Week calendar in 2022, the year Rogge was a semifinalist for the LVMH Prize. She was named emerging talent of the year at the 2021 Belgian Fashion Awards. For Fall 2023 she presented the collection in a bowling alley near the Arc de Triomphe, and for Fall 2024 in the basement of the École Duperré. Her Spring 2025 collection included reworked versions of the four dresses she had designed for her own wedding.

In November 2024, Rogge became the first woman to be named designer of the year at the Belgian Fashion Awards; previous winners included Raf Simons, Anthony Vaccarello, and Glenn Martens. She was a finalist for the 2025 International Woolmark Prize, which was awarded to Dutch designer Duran Lantink at a ceremony in Milan. In March 2025 she staged her first runway show, a Fall 2025 collection presented during Paris Fashion Week against vintage wallpapers from Priem, a Ghent shop; the work of Gordon Matta-Clark framed her thinking for the collection. On June 30, 2025, she won the Grand Prize of the 2025 ANDAM Fashion Awards, which carried a €300,000 grant and a year of mentorship from Sidney Toledano; she was the only woman among the finalists and had been a finalist the previous year.

Her designs have been worn by Rihanna and Chloë Sevigny, and pieces have entered the collections of MoMu in Antwerp, the Fashion & Lace Museum in Brussels, and the Metropolitan Museum of Art in New York. The label is stocked by retailers including SSENSE, Dover Street Market, Net-a-Porter, and Harvey Nichols. Rogge has continued to design the label alongside her work at Marni, showing a Spring 2026 collection in Paris in October 2025.

=== B.B. Wallace ===
In August 2025, Rogge launched the knitwear brand B.B. Wallace with Sarah Allsopp, a British knitwear specialist she had met when both worked at Marc Jacobs. The name combines those of her sons, Bill and Wallace. The brand's core styles are double-faced knits with an outer layer of Shetland wool and a cashmere interior, and each piece is named for an artist, among them Cindy Sherman, Tracey Emin, and Bridget Riley. B.B. Wallace held its launch events during Amsterdam Fashion Week in September 2025.

=== Marni ===
On July 15, 2025, the OTB Group announced Rogge as the new creative director of Marni, succeeding Francesco Risso, who had left the Milan house the previous month after almost ten years. OTB chairman Renzo Rosso said Rogge had impressed the group with "the sensitivity she brought to reinterpreting the brand's DNA". The appointment returned Marni to female leadership for the first time since founder Consuelo Castiglioni and left Rogge as the only female creative director in the OTB stable. She relocated with her family from Antwerp to Milan.

Rogge's first collection for Marni, for Fall/Winter 2026, was shown at Milan Fashion Week in February 2026. To prepare it she studied the house's first collections from 1993, which used no prints and a palette of black, white, brown, and gray, and the show opened in muted tones before reintroducing house signatures such as knee-length coats, dots reworked as large discs and paillettes, and striped and floral prints. Writing in Vogue, Tiziana Cardini said the debut swung the house "back into a woman's hands". Camille Bois-Martin of Numéro wrote that Rogge seemed to be opening "an entirely new chapter for the house".

Her second Marni collection, for Spring 2027, was shown in Milan on September 24, 2026. Alexander Fury wrote in AnOther that it "hit a sweet Marni spot", and Miles Socha of WWD called it "quirkier than ever", younger, and "a bit grungier".

== Style ==
Vogue has described Rogge's work as carrying forward the Belgian heritage of deconstruction "with a light touch". The label's signatures include off-kilter slip dresses, beaded cardigans for men and women, boxer-style bloomers, deconstructed shirting, and roomy elastic-waist khakis. Her collections often draw on specific periods or places, and they incorporate upcycled and reconstructed garments. Reviewing her Fall 2025 show, Vogue noted the mix of "grandma/grandpa dressing with a messy but magical teenage bedroom vibe", achieved without ignoring the "wearability factor".

== Personal life ==
Rogge met Clement Van Vyve around 2019 and married him in May 2024 in Cadaqués, Spain, the hometown of Salvador Dalí. They have two sons, Bill and Wallace. The family moved from Antwerp to Milan following her appointment at Marni.
