= Akmal Shaukat =

British artist

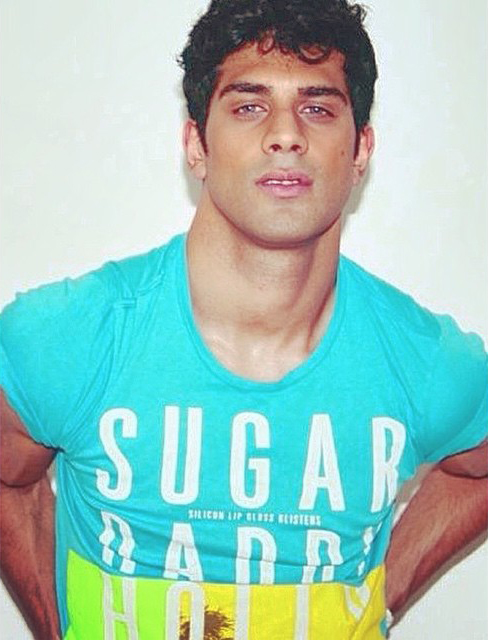
- Shaukat in 2008
- Born: 14 August 1986 (age 39); Bradford, England
- Education: Bradford College of Art
- Occupation: Art director
- Years active: 2008–present
- Era: Modern
- Movement: Salafi movement
- Website: akmalshaukat.com seth-sheth.com

Akmal Shaukat (born 14 August 1986) is a British artist, art director, and magazine editor. He is known for his work with Diesel, Francesco Scognamiglio, Giuliano Fujiwara, Essential Homme Magazine, Schön Magazine, Paper Magazine, and Homme Style Magazine. He is known for his sensual editorial and ad campaigns in fashion.

== Biography ==
Shaukat was born in Bradford, England, to a Pakistani family, and graduated in 2008 from Bradford College of Art in Graphic Media Communication. He completed his master's in History of Visual Culture.

In 2008 he moved to Italy. In 2010 he worked with designer Francesco Scognamiglio. He is known for his conceptual and graphic S/S 2011 ad campaign starring Italian model Bianca Balti, photographed by Giampaolo Sgura.

In 2012 he guest art directed Schön! Magazine Issue 18 (Showbiz), featuring Naomi Campbell on the cover, photographed by Ellen von Unwerth.

In 2014 he curated Homme Style Magazine Issue 7, featuring Lindsay Lohan on the cover, photographed by Rankin.

In 2015 Shaukat joined Hearst Communications within the Commercial Creative Solutions team. Managing brands such as; The Body Shop, Head & Shoulders, Marks & Spencer, Next plc, Rimmel and L'Oréal for titles Cosmopolitan (magazine), Red (magazine), Elle (magazine) and Harper's Bazaar.

== History ==
He has worked with people, publications, and companies including Attitude, Diesel, Francesco Scognamiglio, Fenwick of Bond Street, Giuliano Fujiwara, GQ Italia, GQ Turkey, Homme Style Magazine, L'Officiel Paris, Marjorie Gubelmann, Paper Magazine, and Schön Magazine.

== Seth & Sheth, Inc. ==
Shaukat is the founder and Chief Creative Officer of Seth & Sheth, Inc. a boutique integrated in creative circles, specializing in fashion and lifestyle luxury brands. He has supported some of the most forward-facing campaigns of global brands like Rimmel, L'Oréal Paris and Diesel by creating a mix of digital and print campaigns, product and packaging design.
