= Valextra =

Brand of luxury leather goods

- Founded: 1937; 89 years ago in Milan, Italy
- Founder: Giovanni Fontana
- Headquarters: Milan, Italy
- Owner: Emanuele Carminati Molina (from 2000); Neo Capital (60% from 2013)

Valextra is a brand of luxury leather goods and accessories based in Milan, Italy. The name is a portmanteau of "Valigia", the Italian word for suitcase, and "extra".

== History ==
=== Foundation and early years ===
The Valextra brand was founded in 1937 by Giovanni Fontana in Milan's Piazza San Babila.

From the beginning, Valextra specialised in creating luggage, handbags and accessories from exotic hides such as alligator, hippopotamus and elephant. He set up a workshop above the shop where he worked with a model-maker to bring his concepts to life. In its first few decades, the company licensed over 100 patents and won a Compasso D’Oro for the 24 Ore bag, at the award's inaugural edition in 1954.

=== Brand Evolution ===
During the postwar period, Valextra started catering for entrepreneurs and international jet-setters.

This coincided with the introduction of Fontana's son, Tito, into the company. Together with his son Stefano, Tito introduces a new, design-led direction for the company.

The pair introduced several innovations between 1963 and 1972, when the company also released two new inventions with the modern man in mind: AG Fronzoni's Forma 0, Valextra's first rigid suitcase, and the Premier suitcase, which was gifted to Milan's mayor Aldo Aniasi. This is also when the Small Leather Goods line was properly developed: small, pocket-sized objects.

=== Acquisitions ===
In 2000, the company was purchased by Emanuele Carminati Molina who served as its president until 2013.

In 2013, private equity firm Neo Capital bought 60% of Valextra.

Between 2013 and 2014 Marco Franchini was CEO, and the role was passed to Alessandra Bettari who served as CEO until May 2015.

In May 2015, Sara Ferrero became the company's CEO. Ferrero later founded her fashion brand Sasuphi.

The current CEO of Valextra, announced in January 2021, is Xavier Rougeaux.Ralph Toledano also joined the board of directors.

== Production ==
Each Valextra piece is made in Italy.

Most of its pieces are made from soft-grained Martellato calfskin or the newer smooth Parigi leather (a smooth, semi-matte material), and lined in velvety suede. Almost every bag is produced with white leather lining on the inside. The collections include neutral as well as bright colours.

Each piece is characterised by distinctive details such as the hand-finished black Costa lacquered edge, engineered closures, metallic details. A logo and unique serial number embossed inside the bag, and a monogramming service is available upon request.

Each bag bears the individual artisan number of the craftsperson who oversaw its creation.

Valextra does not make logo-pattern products, the logo is kept exclusively on the inside of their pieces.

Several of the items first made by the company in 1937 are still in production; while cleaning and repairs are provided for life.

The company also offers a service to create custom luggage and handbags to the customer's specification.

== Stores ==
=== Via Manzoni, Milan ===
The company's flagship store in Milan's via Manzoni is inside an 1850s palazzo that also houses the company's head offices. The store sells the company's bags, small leather goods and travel accessories for men and women.

=== International stores ===
Valextra operates stores worldwide.

Valextra is present with flagship stores in mainland China (Chengdu, Shanghai, Beijing), Hong Kong, South Korea and Japan. It also operates flagship locations in department stores in the US and Asia.

=== Design projects ===
Since 2015, the Milanese flagship store was reinterpreted through pop-up installations designed by the most celebrated international designers and architects. Every year, the Via Manzoni store gets a pop-up facelift by an international creative, and past collaborators of the brand include John Pawson, Kengo Kuma, Michael Anastassiades, Snarkitecture and more.

Ferrero also commissions designers and architects to work on both temporary and permanent projects for international stores and in-store corners, with previous projects by Neri & Hu, Shingo Masuda, Atelier Biagetti, Max Lamb, Martino Gamper and Aranda Lasch among others.

== Key products ==
Some of the company's key products include:

Iside: Launched for the first time in 2011, with its distinctive pyramidal shape, the Iside is one of the highest successes of the brand. An eclectic and feminine bag which can be carried as a top handle or worn more casually as a cross body, it is available in four different sizes (micro, mini, medium and large), two different clutches and two cross-body bags, one backpack and one travel bag.

Brera: a piece from the 1950s, the Brera is an everyday bag developed in Valextra workshop in Piazza San Babila. Brera has grown into a collection which includes a top handle style, available in two sizes (medium and large), a shoulder bag, a soft tote, a cross-body bag, purses and accessories.

Passepartout: a large bag that can be carried as a handbag, as a tote or as a duffle bag, with a front pocket that detaches and doubles as an evening clutch. It is available in three sizes (maxi, medium and mini).

Tric Trac: a patented design from 1967, its modern silhouette takes cues from a camera case. The bag was named after the original geometric snap closure, whose ingenious design takes advantage of the natural stiffness of the leather. It is still one of the company's best sellers thanks to its modern form, available in two models. The Tric Trac features a small handle and a zipper compartment that can be used as an on-the-go notebook, or become a mirror case in the bag's more feminine version.

Serie S: it was launched for the first time in 1961 and given a patent for its innovative approach to shape. Valextra relaunched this piece in 2019 with an updated design, and also collaborated with designer Michael Anastassiades on a special version.

Small Leather Goods: the collection includes purses, wallets, coin purses, card cases, glasses cases, key holders.

Travel: faithful to its name, the company still produces a vast range of travel goods. The collection includes the rigid Costa suitcase, two trolleys as well as a series of travel bags and accessories.

== Celebrity customers ==
From the 1940s through 1970s, Valextra handbags and luggage were frequently purchased by celebrities and wealthy clients. Among them were Gianni Agnelli, Grace Kelly, Aristotle and Jacqueline Onassis, Maria Callas.

In November 2019, Jennifer Aniston selected Valextra accessories for the TV series, The Morning Show.
