= Enrico Coveri =

Italian fashion designer and entrepreneur

Enrico Coveri (Italian pronunciation: [enˈriːko ˈkoːveri]; 26 February 1952 – 8 December 1990) was an Italian fashion designer and entrepreneur from Prato.

== Career ==
A former model and stage designer, he founded the eponymous fashion house in Florence and was acclaimed for his creations ever since his first appearance on the catwalks of Milan and Paris in 1977.

His designs are characterized by bright colors, the use of chromaticism, imaginative prints, and distinctive stylistic choices.

The designer presented his first collection, Touche by Enrico Coveri, in Milan in 1973. His creative talent made him famous in the world of fashion and a representative of the taste "Made in Italy". His first collection for women was presented in Paris in 1977 and brought him instant success and praise of fashion press and opinion-makers. The menswear collection followed soon after. Sequins became his signature mark; Le Figaro wrote: "Sequins are to Coveri what chains are to Chanel."

One of the most important awards the creator received was the Grande Médaille de Vermeil in Paris in 1987. Enrico Coveri also received the title of Commendatore della Repubblica, which made him the only person under 35 to receive this accolade.

Enrico Coveri died of a stroke in 1990.
