= Consuelo Castiglioni =

Fashion designer

- Born: 1959 (age 66–67); Lugano, Switzerland
- Occupation: Fashion designer
- Known for: Marni
- Spouse: Gianni Castiglioni
- Children: Carolina

Consuelo Castiglioni (Italian pronunciation: [konˈswɛːlo kastiʎˈʎoːni]; born 1959) is a Swiss fashion designer. She founded the fashion label Marni in 1994.

== Biography ==
Castiglioni is part Chilean and was born and raised in the Italian-speaking town of Lugano, Switzerland.

Though she has no training in fashion, she founded the fashion label Marni in 1994 with her husband Gianni Castiglioni and her step-sister Marina "Marni" Castiglioni (whence the brand name). The label's first collection was fur-only.

In 2001, she released the Fussbett Sandal from recycled tires and straw, and expanded to menswear in 2002. In 2009 she worked with Kim Gordon on geometric designs for Marni.

The brand has been worn by celebrities such as Cindy Sherman, Kyra Sedgwick and Gwyneth Paltrow. Castiglioni was ranked in Fast Company's 2010 "100 most creative people in business".

In 2012, the Castiglioni family sold 60% of Marni to Renzo Rosso's OTB Group. In 2013, the brand launched its first, eponymous, fragrance licensing with Estée Lauder Companies. The Castiglionis sold their remaining shares to OTB in 2015. In 2016, Castiglioni stepped down as creative director of Marni citing a desire to focus on her personal life, and was succeeded by Francesco Risso.

In 2018, Castiglioni's daughter Carolina Castiglioni launched her own fashion label named Plan C.
