= Altonaer Theater =

Theatre in Hamburg

Coordinates: 53°32′56″N 9°56′04″E

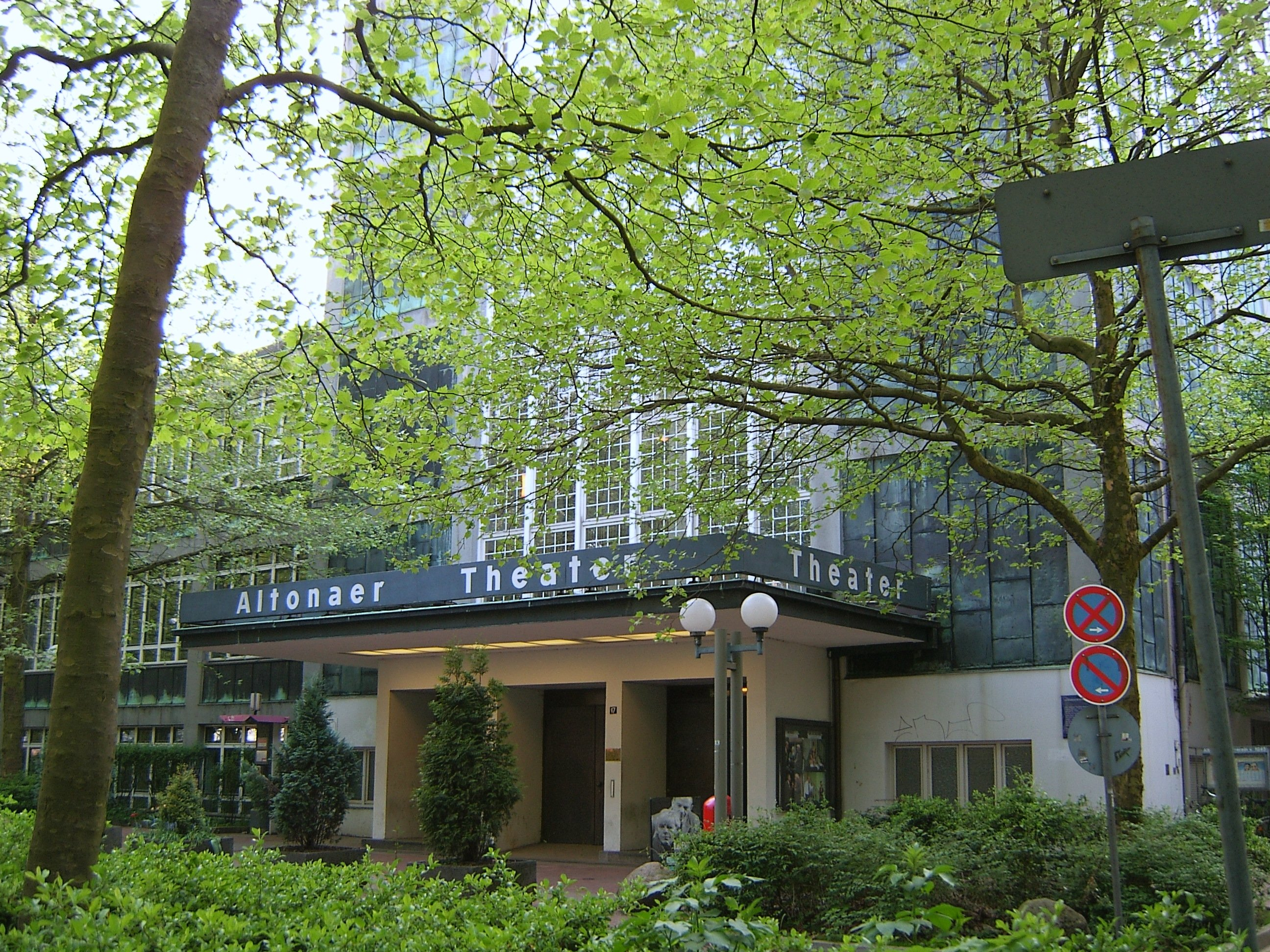
Altonaer Theater

The Altonaer Theater is a theater in Hamburg, Germany. Before Altona's annexation to Hamburg, it was named the Altonaer Stadttheater (Altona City Theater). The private theater adapts literary works for the stage, from classics and international bestsellers to young German literature and more. Past productions include Anna Karenina, Steppenwolf, Measuring the World, and The Hundred-Year-Old Man Who Climbed Out the Window and Disappeared. It presents its own productions, guest performances, and special events. Axel Schneider has been the theater manager since 1995.

== History ==
In 1783, the theater opened on Palmaille "for the leisure of the citizens." It proved an ideal venue for character comedy and drama. After the war, it reopened on Königstraße in 1876. There, more and more contemporary works were staged, which was unusual at the time. In 1943, the building with the beautiful auditorium fell victim to the bombs of World War II.

Since 1954, the auditorium in the former Haus der Jugend (vocational school) on Museumstraße has been the new venue. The complex was built in 1928–30 to designs by Urban Planning Senator Gustav Oelsner. The Neues Bauen-style reinforced concrete structure stands in deliberate contrast with the Altona City Hall and the Altona Museum.
