= Cesare Paciotti =

Italian shoe designer (1958–2025)

- Born: 1 January 1956; Civitanova Marche, Italy
- Died: 12 October 2025 (aged 69); Civitanova Marche, Italy
- Education: DAMS, University of Bologna
- Occupation: Shoe designer
- Known for: Shoes
- Labels: Cesare Paciotti, Paciotti 4US
- Parent(s): Giuseppe & Cecilia Paciotti
- Relatives: Paola Paciotti (sister)
- Website: Cesare Paciotti website

Cesare Paciotti (1 January 1956 – 12 October 2025) was an Italian shoe designer. His eponymous company makes luxury shoes and other leather goods, including jewelry and watches, and he was known for its dagger logo.

== Life and career ==
Cesare Paciotti was born from the marriage between Cecilia and Giuseppe Paciotti in Civitanova Marche, a small city in the province of Macerata in central Italy (on the east side facing the Adriatic Sea). His father had founded a shoe company in 1948. Cesare studied at the prestigious DAMS (Drama, Art and Music Studies) degree course of the University of Bologna and then travelled around the world before inheriting the family business in 1980. He took the main creative role at the newly renamed Cesare Paciotti company, whilst his sister Paola looked after operational matters.

Paciotti has two children from his first wife; Ludovica and Giuseppe Paciotti, as well as a daughter from his second marriage.

Cesare Paciotti died on 12 October 2025, at the age of 69.

== Lines ==
There are three labels owned by the company Cesare Paciotti: Cesare Paciotti, and Cesare Paciotti 4US, dedicated to the production and selling of shoes and bags; "Cesare Paciotti Jewels" is the collection of jewellery.
