= Marni (brand) =

Italian luxury fashion house

Marni Group S.r.l.
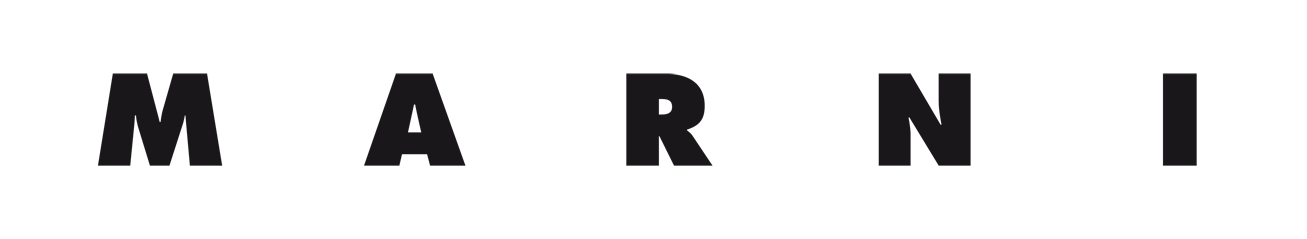
- Type: Subsidiary
- Industry: Fashion
- Founded: 1994; 32 years ago in Milan, Italy
- Founder: Consuelo Castiglioni
- Headquarters: Milan, Italy
- Area served: Worldwide
- Key people: Stefano Rosso (CEO); Meryll Rogge (creative director)
- Products: Ready-to-wear clothing, Fashion accessories, Footwear, Jewellery, Homewares
- Revenue: ▲US$170 million (2019)
- Parent: OTB Group
- Website: www.marni.com

Marni is an Italian luxury fashion house founded in 1994 by Consuelo Castiglioni in Milan, Italy. The company offers ready-to-wear and accessories collections for women, men and children. Marni was acquired by Italian fashion group OTB in 2015. Since 2025, Meryll Rogge has been the brand's creative director.

== History ==
Founded in Milan, Italy in 1994 by Swiss designer Consuelo Castiglioni, Marni has become world-renowned for its experimental collections characterized by the use of innovative prints and colors.

Starting in 2000, the company expanded into major international markets by opening stores and establishing a presence in department stores across Europe, the Americas and Asia. During the same years, Marni pioneered online retail with the launch of its online store in Europe and the United States, combining e-commerce with sections dedicated to artistic collaborations and special projects.

In 2011, Marni signed a licensing agreement with Spazio Sei Fashion Group for the production and worldwide distribution of the Marni Children line for girls, designed by Consuelo Castiglioni.

In 2012, the Castiglioni family confirmed that it was looking for a financial partner in order to expand Marni’s retail business. The family sold 60 percent of the company to Renzo Rosso's OTB Group that same year. Today, OTB’s portfolio also includes Diesel, Jil Sander, Maison Margiela and Viktor & Rolf. The Group also controls and manages the Staff International and Brave Kid companies, and holds a stake in American brand Amiri.

That same year, Marni launched a one-off collection for H&M with a promotional film by Sofia Coppola starring model Liu Wen and actress Imogen Poots in Marrakesh; The Marni Denim line was also launched that year.

In 2015, Marni was fully acquired by OTB Group. Shortly after, the manufacturing arm of OTB, Staff International, took over production and worldwide distribution of Marni’s men’s collections, including ready-to-wear, accessories, footwear and small leather goods.

In 2016, Consuelo Castiglioni and other members of her family left the company. Instead, Marni appointed Francesco Risso as creative director.

In 2018, the company appointed Stefano Biondo as chief executive officer.

In 2019, the company appointed Barbara Calò as General Manager. That same year, Francesco Risso was included in the BoF 500, the Business of Fashion's annual list of the industry's most influential people.

In 2022, Marni expanded its programme of collaborative projects through partnerships with Uniqlo and the French footwear brand Veja. The Uniqlo collaboration included ready-to-wear and accessories, while the partnership with Veja focused on footwear. Marni continued this strategy in subsequent years with a collection developed with Carhartt WIP in 2023 and a sneaker collaboration with Hoka in 2025.

Between 2022 and 2023, Marni presented its collections through a series of runway shows staged in New York, Tokyo and Paris. Many celebrities and influential personalities attended the events including Madonna, Kendall Jenner, Doja Cat, Ghali, and Joshua and Mingyu of the South Korean group Seventeen.

In May 2024, Stefano Rosso was named Chief Executive Officer.

In June 2025, Francesco Risso stepped down as creative director of Marni.

In July 2025, Meryll Rogge was appointed Creative Director of the Fashion House.Her debut collection for Marni was presented during Milan Fashion Week in February 2026.

Over the years, Marni designs have been worn by celebrities from music and entertainment industries, including Beyoncé, Rihanna, Dua Lipa, Harry Styles, Cate Blanchett and Maggie Gyllenhaal. The brand has also dressed international celebrities at the Met Gala, including Nicki Minaj, Charli XCX and Taika Waititi.

== Licensing ==
=== Cosmetics ===
In 2012, Marni launched its first women’s fragrance. In 2024, the brand entered a licensing agreement with beauty conglomerate Coty for cosmetics and fragrances. The first products under this deal will launch in 2026 and the contract extends through 2040.

=== Children’s line ===
Marni has been having licensing agreements with Spazio 6 (2011–2015), and Brave Kid (since 2015) for the production and worldwide distribution of its children’s line dedicated to girls aged between two and 12.

=== Eyewear ===
Marni signed a licensing agreement with Marchon Eyewear in 2015 for the production and distribution of its eyewear line, designed by Consuelo Castiglioni. In 2021, the brand signed with Retrosuperfuture for their eyewear licensing.

=== Other activities ===
During Milan Design Week in 2023, Marni launched a collections of tableware with Belgian design label Serax and a wallpaper series with Italian wall covering-maker LondonArt.

== Management ==
- 2018–2019: Stefano Biondo
- 2019–2024: Barbara Calò
- 2024–present: Stefano Rosso

== See also ==
- Italian fashion
