= Gattinoni =

Italian fashion house

- Company type: Private
- Founded: 1946; 80 years ago
- Founder: Fernanda Gattinoni
- Headquarters: Rome, Italy
- Products: Clothing – Fashion accessory - Footwear
- Website: www.gattinoni.com

Gattinoni is an Italian fashion brand founded in 1946 by Fernanda Gattinoni.

In 1946 Fernanda Gattinoni chose a strategic location for her Maison, near the Hotel Excelsior. In this way, the designer was able to meet and dress illustrious people such as the American ambassador Clare Boothe Luce, Evita Perón, the actresses Ingrid Bergman, Anna Magnani, Audrey Hepburn, Silvana Pampanini, Lana Turner and Kim Novak.

In 1996, a prêt-à-porter collection was added to the maison's high fashion line after the restyling of the label by Raniero Gattinoni, son of the brand's founder, and Stefano Dominella, current President of the maison, to whom the brands Gattinoni Boutique, Pret d'Immagine, Tempo, Gattinoni Basic, Gattinoni Softwear, Gattinoni Domus (household linen) and others were added. In 1997 the Gattinoni perfume was launched on the market, followed by an entire line of beauty products of the brand. In 1993, after the untimely death of Raniero Gattinoni, the young designer Guillermo Mariotto took over the creative direction of all the Gattinoni lines. Today he creatively directs and supervises the Gattinoni Couture line.

In 2002, the Gattinoni fashion house designed the new army uniforms on behalf of the Italian Army.
