= Fernanda Gattinoni =

Italian fashion designer (1906–2002)

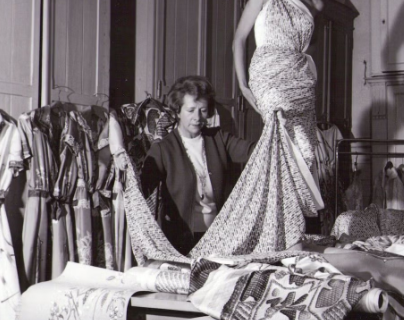
- Fernanda Gattinoni in Rome, 1958
- Born: 2 December 1906; Cocquio-Trevisago, Varese, Lombardy, Italy
- Died: 27 November 2002 (aged 95); Rome, Italy
- Citizenship: Italy
- Occupation: Fashion designer
- Years active: 1924–2002
- Children: 1
- Awards: Knight of the Grand Cross of the Order of Merit of the Italian Republic

Fernanda Gattinoni (2 December 1906 – 27 November 2002) was an Italian fashion designer who was the founder of the Gattinoni atelier. She left Italy at age 17 and worked as an apprentice for the London-based Molineaux fashion house. Gattinoni returned to Italy in 1930 to become head of the creative department for the Ventura atelier after declining an offer to work for Chanel in Paris. In 1946, she established the Gattinoni atelier and designed costumes for Italian notability and notable foreign figures. Gattinoni earned a nomination for the Academy Award for Best Costume Design with her design of Audrey Hepburn's attire in the 1956 film War and Peace. She was appointed Knight of the Grand Cross of the Order of Merit of the Italian Republic in July 1998. A biography on Gattinoni was published in 2010 and a garden in Rome was named after the fashion designer four years later.

== Biography ==
On 2 December 1906, Gattinoni was born in Cocquio Trevisago, in the province of Varese, in Lombardy, Northern Italy. She was educated at a school run by Swiss nuns in Besozzo. At the age of 17 in 1924, she left Italy and moved to London, where she worked as an apprentice in the workshops of the Molineaux fashion house. Gattinoni helped design Marie-José of Belgium's wedding dress for her 1930 marriage to Umberto of Savoy, the future King of Italy. She declined an offer to work for the Chanel fashion house in Paris in the late 1920s, since she disliked the atmosphere of the city. In 1930, Gattinoni moved back to Italy and began to creatively collaborate with the Milan-based Ventura atelier as the head of its creative department. Gattinoni was appointed Ventura's director of design department when the fashion house opened an office in Rome in 1934.

She continued to work for Ventura until the end of the Second World War in 1945. The following year, Gattinoni established her own self-named small atelier on the Via Marche. During her time running her atelier, she designed costumes for Italian notability and foreign individuals such as Jacqueline Kennedy, the American First Lady, Eva Perón of Argentina, Princess Margaret, Countess of Snowdon and American Ambassador Clare Boothe Luce. Gattinoni became notable in the 1950s and 1960s during the period of Hollywood on the Tiber, where she had 25 embroiders working full-time on her gowns made of heavy taffetas and marocain and subsequently chiffon. She was the designer of costumes worn on and off-camera by Ingrid Bergman, Lucia Bosè, Clara Calamai, Angie Dickinson, Ava Gardner, Gina Lollobrigida, Anna Magnani, Kim Novak, Elizabeth Taylor and Lana Turner. The sister of the Shah of Persia wore a dress designed for her own wedding by Gattinoni.

The attire she designed for Audrey Hepburn to wear playing the role of Natasha in the 1956 film War and Peace earned Gattinoni a nomination for the Academy Award for Best Costume Design. Gattinoni's atelier was run by her son from 1985 until his early death in 1993, after which it was operated by the designer Guillermo Mariotto. She remained at the atelier holding an interest in Mariotto's affairs. She received an audience with the Pope in 1999, who asked her about the latest fashion trends and gave her advice.

== Personal life ==
Gattinoni had one son. She was appointed Knight of the Grand Cross of the Order of Merit of the Italian Republic by Oscar Luigi Scalfaro, the Italian President, in July 1998. In December 2001, Gattinoni earned "La Lupa" recognition from the City of Rome. On 25 November 2002, she was working at her headquarters in Rome when she became unwell and was transported to Policlinico Umberto I hospital. Gattinoni died of an unspecified illness two days later on the morning of 27 November 2002.

== Approach and legacy ==
She was a minimalist and worked her embroidery into her designs. Gattinoni referred to her designs as "elegant and sober" and disliked of gowns that revealed too much, saying "Nakedness is not stylish." In 2002, she commented what elegance meant to her and was critical of gimmicks to attract attention: "Rules exist: no extravagance and no nudity. I've struggled my whole life to teach women that transparent clothes are useless – they tantalise but don't seduce. What mystery is left for these poor men to unveil?"

According to Lola Galán of El País, Gattinoni "was always faithful to the criteria of orthodox elegance, and hated, for example, transparencies and excessive suits. 'The nude excites, but does not conquer,' she used to say to his clients." She frequently went to her headquarters until the final days of her life. The correspondent for The Times noted "She rose at seven in the morning, and after coffee would be at mass at 9am. From church she would go straight to her shop, office, studio and workrooms, and not emerge again until well into the evening."

A street in Rome was announced as being named for her. The Sistema Informativo Unificato per le Soprintendenze Archivistiche holds a collection of papers from the period between 1935 and 2009. They include her drawings, costume making materials and media materials. In 2010, a biography of Gattinoni authored by Aldo D'Ambrosi and Nuovi Autori and called Cent'anni di stile, Vita di Fernanda Gattinoni creatrice di alta moda e di concrete utopie was published. Four years later, a garden in Rome was named after her and a toponymic plaque bearing the inscription "Giardino Fernanda Gattinoni: Sarta e Creatrice di moda (1907–2002)" was inaugurated in January 2015.
