= Piquadro =

Italian leather goods company and group

Piquadro S.p.A.
- Type: Società per azioni
- Traded as: BIT: PQ
- ISIN: IT0004240443
- Industry: Leather goods
- Founded: 1987 in Riola di Vergato, Italy
- Headquarters: Silla di Gaggio Montano, Italy
- Key people: Marco Palmieri, Chairman and CEO
- Products: Leather goods, travel accessories, small leather goods
- Brands: Piquadro, The Bridge, Lancel
- Revenue: ▲€183.6 million (FY 2024/25)
- Number of employees: ~1,000
- Subsidiaries: Piquadro España S.L.U.; Piquadro Deutschland GmbH; Piquadro France S.A.R.L.; Piquadro UK Ltd; Piquadro Hong Kong Ltd; Piquadro Swiss S.A.; Unibest Leather Goods Zhongshan Co. Ltd
- Website: www.piquadro.com

Piquadro S.p.A. is an Italian leather goods company headquartered in Silla di Gaggio Montano, in the Metropolitan City of Bologna. Founded in 1987 by Marco Palmieri, the group designs, manufactures, and distributes premium leather accessories under three brands: the eponymous Piquadro, the Florentine heritage label The Bridge, and the French luxury house Lancel.

The group's distribution network spans more than 50 countries and comprises 174 retail outlets as of the financial year ended 31 March 2025. Piquadro S.p.A. has been listed on Borsa Italiana (Euronext Milan) since October 2007.

== Corporate history ==
The company was founded in 1987 by Marco Palmieri.

In 1998, the Piquadro brand was launched. Its name means "P squared" with the "P" standing for both Palmieri (the founder) and pelletterie (leather goods). The first Piquadro single branded store was opened in Milan via della Spiga in 2000 and it was followed by Rome via Frattina two year later.

In 2004, the company began an internationalization campaign including investments and the opening of new stores abroad in Moscow and Barcelona. In the following years, more shops were inaugurated in Salzburg, Frankfurt, Hong Kong, until the most recent openings in the United Arab Emirates, Shanghai, Beijing, and Taipei.

In 2006, the new headquarters were inaugurated in Gaggio Montano, on the road that takes from Bologna to Pistoia in Tuscany.

In October 2007, Piquadro was listed on the Italian stock exchange (Borsa Italiana). In 2010, the company sells through an International distribution network which includes 82 Piquadro single branded shops, of which 48 are located in Italy.

The consolidated turnover of the Group at March 2010 was 52,2 million euros with a 1% increase compared to the previous year and a 22,1% average increase in the 6 previous years.

== Partnerships ==
In 2018, Piquadro was announced as the official tech travel partner of AC Milan.

== Ownership structure ==
- Marco Palmieri — 67%
- Fil Limited — 6.9%
- Mediobanca — 6.3%
- Mercato — 19.7%

Source: Consob, April 14, 2010

== See also ==
- Armani
- Attolini
- Luciano Barbera
- Belvest
- Blufin
- Boglioli
- Borrelli
- Borsalino
- Bottega Veneta
- Braccialini
- Brioni
- Luciano Brunelli
- Buccellati
- Bulgari
- Canali
- Caraceni
- Roberto Cavalli
- Corneliani
- Costume National
- Brunello Cucinelli
- Damiani
- Dolce & Gabbana
- Etro
- Extè
- Fendi
- Ferragamo
- Fiorucci
- Sorelle Fontana
- Frette
- Furla
- Genny
- GIADA
- Gucci
- Gianfranco Ferré
- Iceberg
- Isaia
- La Perla
- Lardini
- Larusmiani
- André Laug
- Loro Piana
- Kiton
- Krizia
- Malo
- E. Marinella
- Marni
- Max Mara
- Missoni
- Moschino
- Piana Clerico
- Pinko
- Pomellato
- Prada
- Reda
- Stefano Ricci
- Marina Rinaldi
- Rubinacci
- Sermoneta Gloves
- Ermanno Scervino
- Tod's
- Trussardi
- Valentino
- Valextra
- Versace
- Vitale Barberis Canonico
- Zegna
- Pal Zileri
- Made in Italy
