= Designer label =

Products sold under a marque named after a designer

The Tommy Hilfiger brand is an example of a designer label.

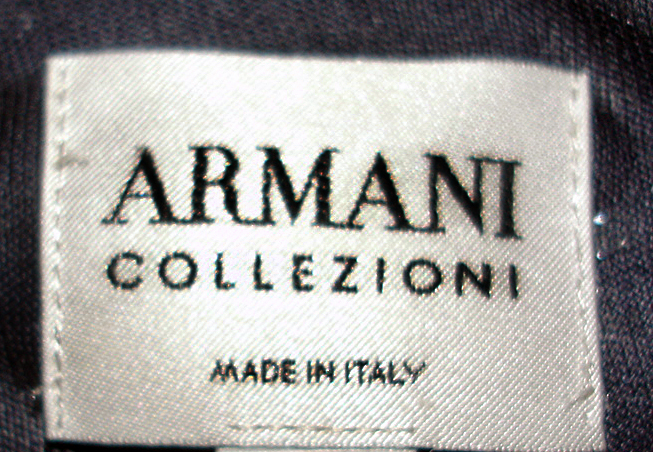
Armani is another example of luxury designer clothing label.

The term designer label refers to clothing, luxury automobile manufacturers and other personal accessory items sold under an often prestigious marque which is commonly named after a designer, founder, or a location-like where the company was founded (such as BMW). The term is most often applied to luxury goods. While members of the upper middle class, or the mass affluent, are perhaps the most commonly targeted customers of these designer labels, some marquees—such as Cartier, Rolex, Montblanc and the haute couture — tend to a wealthier customer base. But almost every designer brand has merchandise that the middle-class wouldn't normally be able to afford, such as exotic skins, furs and hides, limited edition pieces, or things simply priced higher. Designer label companies use their smaller and cheaper merchandise, aimed at the middle class, such as wallets, fashion jewellery, key-rings and small accessories, to make the majority of their income, whilst the more expensive pieces such as haute couture, high jewellery, hand-bags, shoes and even furnishings are usually reserved for the wealthier upper-class clientele.

Many big designer labels focus on haute couture and marketing while licensing the production of their cheaper merchandise to others. In the eyewear industry for example brands like Burberry, Chanel, Armani and Prada license their brand names to market leaders like Luxottica.

Many department stores themselves may be considered designer labels, such as Neiman Marcus, Harrods, David Jones and Daimaru.

Designer labels are not only restricted to the fashion design industry. Many car and motorcycle companies such as Rolls-Royce, Harley-Davidson and Mercedes-Benz are regarded as designer labels. These companies make their vehicles to a higher standard than the average manufacturers and many other attributes such leather used in the upholstery, woodwork and paneling, high levels of technology, extra safety and speed are employed to make for a better product. These vehicles are also in high demand all over the world, and waiting lists may be applied to some models, such as the Rolls-Royce Phantom and the Bugatti Veyron.

Many people consider designer labels to be a status symbol.

Some research indicates that products with designer labels on them are perceived as higher in quality and fashionability than the same products without designer labels. Other studies show evidence that brand names do influence consumers perception of price, but not of quality of the products.

The relationship between consumer products and social status is highly debated.

== List ==
- Armani
- Attolini
- Ted Baker
- Manolo Blahnik
- Thom Browne
- Hugo Boss
- Burberry
- Tory Burch
- Canali
- Cavalli
- Chanel
- Charles & Keith
- Kenneth Cole
- Comme des Garçons
- Brunello Cucinelli
- Capri
  - Jimmy Choo
  - Michael Kors
- Dolce & Gabbana
- Escada
- Etro
- Ferragamo
- Ferré
- Fiorucci
- Tom Ford
- Diane von Fürstenberg
- Furla
- Jean Paul Gaultier
- Goyard
- Hermès
- Tommy Hilfiger
- Isaia
- Marc Jacobs
- Betsey Johnson
- Donna Karan
- Calvin Klein
- Kiton
- Lacroix
- Lacoste
- Karl Lagerfeld
- Helmut Lang
- Lanvin
- Guy Laroche
- Lardini
- Ralph Lauren
- Judith Leiber
- Nanette Lepore
- Monique Lhuillier
- Phillip Lim
- Dan Liu
- Christian Louboutin
- Steve Madden
- Tomas Maier
- Léo Marciano
- Maison Margiela
- Lana Marks
- Stella McCartney
- Issey Miyake
- Missoni
- Moschino
- Mouawad
- Thierry Mugler
- Mulberry
- Maria Pinto
- Zac Posen
- Prada
  - Miu Miu
  - Versace
- Emilio Pucci
- Billy Reid
- Oscar de la Renta
- Sergio Rossi
- Sonia Rykiel
- Elie Saab
- SabyaSachi
- Proenza Schouler
- Paul Smith
- Kate Spade
- Anna Sui
- Elie Tahari
- Tahiliani
- Tiffany & Co
- Philip Treacy
- Trussardi
- Valentino
- Giambattista Valli
- John Varvatos
- Kering
  - Gucci
  - Yves Saint Laurent
  - Boucheron
  - Bottega Veneta
  - Balenciaga
  - Alexander McQueen
  - Brioni
  - Girard-Perregaux
  - Qeelin
  - Pomellato
  - Christopher Kane
  - Ulysse Nardin
- LVMH
  - Celine
  - Dior
  - Fendi
  - Givenchy
  - Loro Piana
  - Louis Vuitton
- OTB
  - Marni
  - Viktor & Rolf
- Puig
  - Carolina Herrera
  - Rabanne
- E. Marinella
- Alexander Wang
- Vera Wang
- Vivienne Westwood
- Jason Wu
- Wooyoungmi
- Yohji Yamamoto
- Giuseppe Zanotti
- Zegna
- Chrome Hearts
