= Asians in New York City =

Ethnic group

Languages
- English, Mandarin (官話), Cantonese (廣東話), Fuzhounese (福州話), Bengali (বাংলা), Gujarati (ગુજરાતી), Hindi (हिन्दी), Tamil (தமிழ்), Telugu (తెలుగు), Tagalog, Urdu (اُردُو), Korean (한국어), Arabic (اَلْعَرَبِيَّةُ), Vietnamese (Tiếng Việt), Thai (ภาษาไทย), Japanese (日本語), Khmer (ខ្មែរ), Hmong (𖬇𖬰𖬞 𖬌𖬣𖬵), Lao (ລາວ), and other Languages of Asia, as well as Spanish (español)

Religion
- Confucianism, Taoism, Hinduism, Islam, Buddhism, Catholicism, Sikhism, Irreligion, Others

Related ethnic groups
- Asian Americans

Asians in New York City are residents of New York City of Asian descent or origin. New York City is home to the largest uniracial Asian diaspora of any city in the world; while the New York metropolitan area is home to the largest uniracial metropolitan Asian population outside of Asia, at an estimated 2,837,641 as of 2025. As of 2025, New York City proper alone was home to 1,413,843 uniracial Asian individuals, the largest of any city proper outside Asia.

== Population ==
New York City proper alone, according to 2025 U.S. Census Bureau estimates, has become home to more than 1.4 million uniracial Asian Americans, greater than the combined totals of San Francisco and Los Angeles. New York contains the highest total Asian population of any U.S. city proper, while the New York metropolitan area is home to the largest uniracial Asian population outside of Asia, at approximately 2,837,641 as of 2025. The fastest-growing Asian neighborhood in New York City is Long Island City, Queens.

=== Chinese New Yorkers ===
In 2020, approximately 9% of New York City's population was of Chinese ethnicity, with approximately 80 percent of Chinese New Yorkers living in the boroughs of Queens and Brooklyn alone, and over 90% living in Queens, Brooklyn, and/or Manhattan. New York City proper alone contains by far the highest ethnic Chinese population of any individual city outside Asia, estimated at 628,763 as of 2017, with approximately 925,000 in the New York metropolitan area as of 2024. Much of the Chinese community lives in Chinatown, Brooklyn; Chinatown, Manhattan; Flushing, Queens; Long Island City, Queens; Sunset Park, Brooklyn; and Bensonhurst, Brooklyn. In September 2023, New York State made Lunar New Year a mandatory public school holiday.

=== South Asian New Yorkers ===
Indian and Indian Americans comprise the largest American municipal South Asian diaspora, comprising 2.4% of the city's population, with Bangladeshi and Bangladeshi Americans and people of Pakistani heritage at 0.7% and 0.5%, respectively. Queens is over 8% South Asian; 6-7% Indian. Tompkinsville, Staten Island has many Sri Lankans. In 2023, New York State made Diwali a mandatory public school holiday.

=== Korean New Yorkers ===
People of Korean heritage made up 1.2% of the city's population. They are more commonly in Flushing and Koreatown, Manhattan.

=== Filipino New Yorkers ===
Filipino and Filipino Americans were the largest southeast Asian ethnic group at 0.8%. The community has a stronghold in Woodside, Queens. Around 13,000 Filipino Americans and immigrants live in this area, equating to 15% of Woodside's population.

=== Japanese New Yorkers ===
Japanese or Japanese American heritage people are 0.3% and mostly have a presence in Manhattan.

=== Vietnamese New Yorkers ===
People of Vietnamese heritage made up 0.2% of New York City's population in 2010.

== Organizations and activism ==
One of the partner research centers of the Asian American and Pacific Islander Policy Research Consortium is based at the City University of New York. New York University hosts the Program in Asian/Pacific/American Studies. "Serve the People: The Asian American Movement in New York" was an exhibition at Interference Archive from December 2013 to March 2014, supported by the Museum of Chinese in America.

Activist organizations:

- Asian American Federation of New York
- Asian American Legal Defense and Education Fund
- Asian Americans for Equality
- MinKwon Center for Community Action

Cultural organizations:

- Asian American Arts Centre
- Asian American Dance Theatre
- Asian American International Film Festival
- Asian American Writers' Workshop
- Asian Pacific American Heritage Festival
- Asian American Arts Alliance
- Happy Family Night Market

== See also ==
- Bangladeshis in New York City
- Chinese people in New York City
- Filipinos in the New York metropolitan area
- Fuzhounese in New York City
- Indians in the New York City metropolitan area
- Japanese in New York City
- Korean Americans in New York City
- List of U.S. cities with significant Chinese-American populations
- List of U.S. cities with significant Korean-American populations
- Taiwanese people in New York City
