= Lancel (company) =

French Maison of luxury leather goods

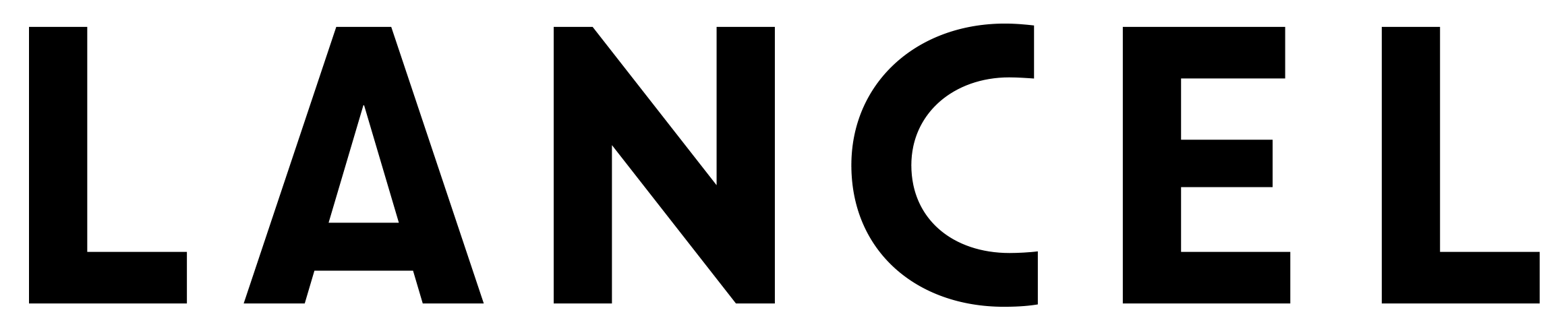
- Industry: Handbag
- Founded: 1876
- Founder: Angèle and Alphonse Lancel
- Headquarters: Paris, France
- Area served: Worldwide
- Key people: Giovanni Bonatti (CEO)
- Products: Handbags suitcases, small leather goods, accessories...
- Parent: Piquadro SpA
- Website: lancel.com

Lancel is a French Maison of luxury leather goods, founded in Paris in 1876 by Angèle and Alphonse Lancel and developed by their son Albert.

It remained in the hands of the couple's descendants until it was acquired in the late 1970s by the Zorbibe brothers, who then launched the popular bucket-shaped Elsa bag under Chief Executive Sidney Toledano, now CEO of LVMH Fashion Group.

The company is based in Paris, where it owns a landmark store at 8, Place de l’Opera, with over 80 more boutiques globally.

== History ==
=== Foundation ===
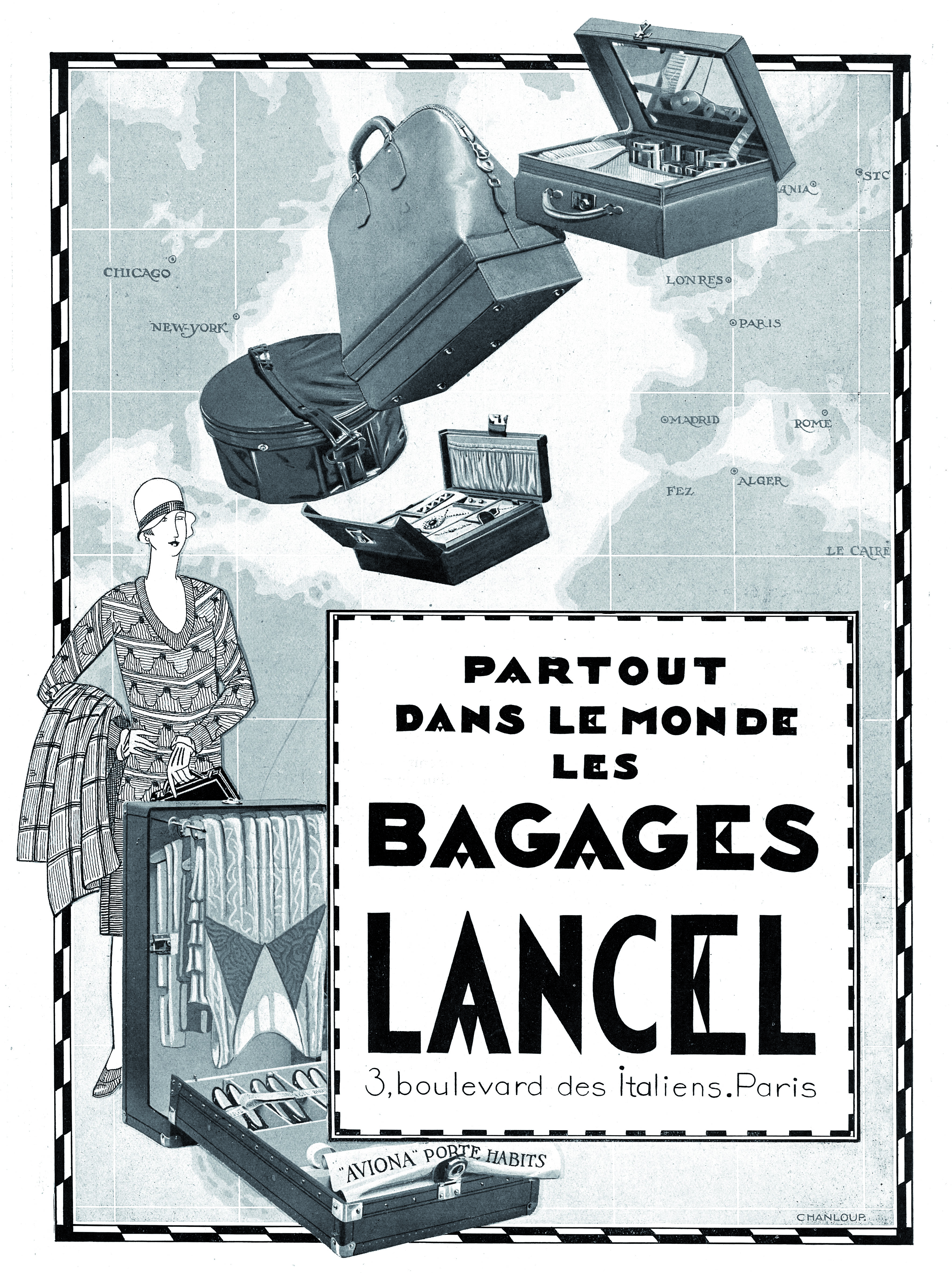

Lancel was founded by Angèle and her husband Alphonse Lancel in 1876, in Paris, France.

Angèle and Alphonse manufactured and sold pipes and accessories for smokers in a small shop in Paris.

At the end of the 1880s, cigarettes became popular in France, especially among women. Lancel has developed a range of products for women smokers, such as cigarette cases.

=== Handbags ===
From 1883, the company produced leather goods. Lancel opened a leather workshop and began making handbags in line with demand. Angèle Lancel designed bags to keep smoking items organized. She replaced almoner's pouches with handbags.

In 1900, Angèle designed "le sac à malices" (bag of tricks), a bag that featured hidden pockets. Lancel launched its first handbag collection in 1902.

The couple's business grew quickly, and they added a wide range of products to their collection, including gifts, jewellery, watches, and decorations. They either produced the items themselves or enlisted the help of skilled craftsmen.

A few years after its launch, Lancel developed a retail outlet network. In the 1900s, the brand registered around 10 boutiques.

=== Development ===
Their son Albert took the company's reins in 1901 and transformed the modest company into a global brand. He immediately placed the handbag at the core of the company's strategy. He suggested using fine leathers including lizard and calfskin. Albert also suggested adding pockets and other features. In 1929, he designed the Parapluie, which contained a mirror, a makeup bag, and a folding umbrella.

1927 was a turning point for the company. The brand launched a bucket bag with a flexible shape.

By the 1920s, the company also specialized in crafted grand tour luggage.

Albert Lancel then filed a patent for the Bambino, the world's smallest portable radio, and the Aviona trunk. The company became a brand for luxury leather goods and accessories in Paris.

In the 1920s, Lancel was the first luxury brand to send its clients a catalog.

In 1929, Lancel opened a flagship store selling handbags and accessories in the Opera district, where the brand is still present today.

=== After WW2 ===
Lancel was one of the top three luxury leather goods brands in Europe from 1930s to 1990s.

Lancel launched a luggage collection in the 1950s and used nylon canvas to manufacture supple luggage items. Lancel designed the Kangourou suitcase with Nélac, a specific nylon thread especially made for the brand. The Kangourou was the first suitcase made with a light and supple canvas.

When Albert Lancel died in 1960, his daughters took the reins. The Zorbibe brothers, who were subcontractors, joined forces and finally bought Lancel in 1976 to widen the business expansion.

In 1982, Lancel launched a sports collection using the nylon canvas reminiscent of the Kangourou suitcase designed 30 years previously.

To celebrate its 60th anniversary, Lancel relaunched the bucket bag in 1987 under the name "Elsa de Lancel". 6 million pieces were sold worldwide within 10 years.

=== Artist endorsements ===
In 1970, Salvador Dalí sketched Le Dali handbag for his wife and muse Gala, with the help of Lancel's craftsmen. He created La Toile Daligram. Le Dali was embossed with the secret love code. The bag referenced his love alphabet, "Daligramme", made up of eight cryptograms. The bag had a bicycle chain strap as a symbol of attachment between two people going in the same direction and other symbols.

This canvas was reinterpreted in 2011 in the Daligramme collection, a 50-piece series of handbags, purses, wallets and other accessories that paid tribute to the Spanish artist.

In 2008, Isabelle Adjani, French actress and brand muse, joined forces to create a line of handbags.

=== 2000's ===
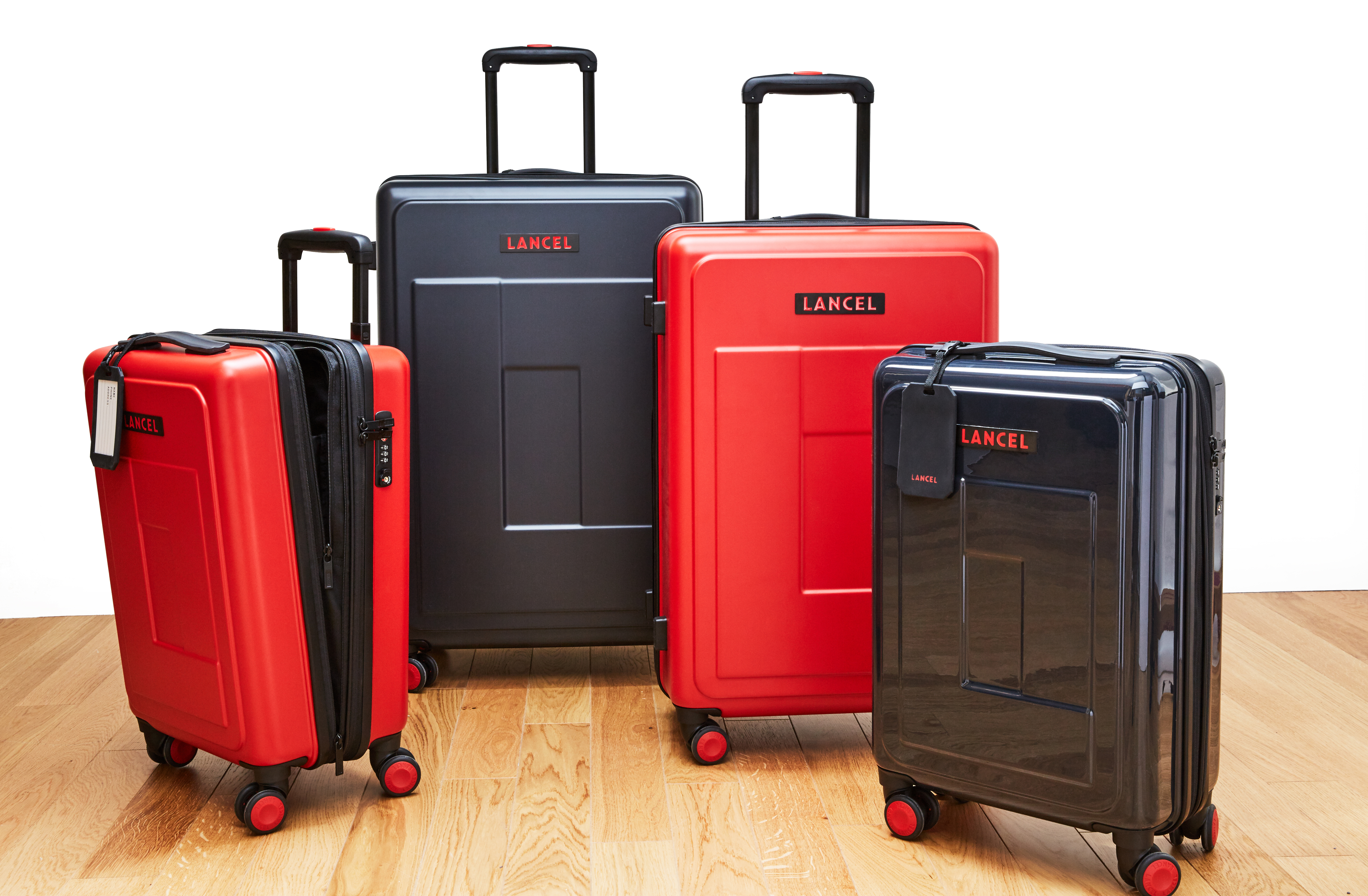
Aviona collection

In the 2000s, Lancel continued its expansion with the launch of various collections.

In 2006, Lancel reissued the Elsa bucket bag in celebration of its 20th anniversary. In the same year, the company designed Premier Flirt, which became another hit.

Lancel launched various signature handbags which included the Premier Flirt, the Adjani, the Daligramme, L'Amante, and the Brigitte Bardot.

Early on, Lancel branched out to cater to a masculine clientele. In 2015, the French national tricolor flag was printed on the weekender and travel bag collection.

In 2011, Lancel celebrated its 135th anniversary. Lancel launched the Angèle handbag for the occasion, which featured hidden mirrors.

In 2013, Lancel created the L bag, inspired by a 1970s bag found in the company archives. A year later, the brand produced the Charlie, referencing a bag sold in the 1960s. In the 2015 men's collection, briefcases typified high-class businessmen of the 1930s and 1940s.

In 2015, Lancel launched a new line of travel bags called Pop. It was made in France. Thanks to its soft leather, this collection was light and pliable.

Lancel relaunched its range of luggage in 2016 with its "Explorer" products and with Aviona in 2017.

In 2016, Lancel organized various events to celebrate its 140-year history: a travelling exhibition and a book with Flammarion in which several artists were invited to a carte blanche. Marjane Satrapi, Martin Parr, Omar Victor Diop were few of them.

In 2018, following the acquisition by the Piquadro Group, Lancel relaunched the Premier Flirt and launched the Ninon bag, which has become its best seller and is now proposed in new colors and variations at every season.

== Economy ==
In 1997, Swiss company Richemont, the world's third biggest luxury group which owns Cartier, Van Cleef & Arpels, Piaget, and Montblanc, acquired Lancel for 270 million euros ($375 million). and, in 2018, sold it to the Italian company Piquadro Group, specializing in leather goods and owner of the Florentine heritage brand The Bridge and the tech-design brand of travel and business accessories Piquadro.
