= Casablanca Paris =

French designer label (founded 2018)

- Type: Private
- Industry: Fashion
- Founded: 2018
- Founder: Charaf Tajer
- Headquarters: London, United Kingdom
- Key people: Charaf Tajer (Creative Director); Didier Nguyen (CEO)
- Products: Menswear, womenswear, luxury accessories, leather goods, footwear
- Website: casablancaparis.com

Casablanca Paris is a French designer label founded in 2018 by Paris-born fashion designer Charaf Tajer, whose Moroccan heritage is part of the brand’s identity.

The brand has an après-sport aesthetic with hand-painted prints. It was shortlisted as a finalist for the LVMH Prize in 2020.

== History ==
Originally establishing itself as a menswear label in 2018 with a budget of $3,000, Casablanca launched its first collection in 2019. The brand expanded its product line to include womenswear and accessories.

Casablanca was selected as one of the eight finalists for the Moët Hennessy Louis Vuitton (LVMH) Prize (2020). Due to the disruption caused by the COVID-19 pandemic, the competition concluded with all finalists being recognised as joint winners.

In June 2023, the brand underwent a corporate restructuring and was acquired by a newly formed company, Casablanca Paris Ltd.

== Founder ==
Charaf Tajer, Casablanca’s founder and creative director, grew up in Paris to Moroccan immigrant parents who met in a textile workshop. Tajer initially pursued studies in architecture and child psychology. He co-founded Parisian streetwear brand Pigalle with Stéphane Ashpool in 2008, and in 2010 he founded Paris nightclub Le Pompon. Before Casablanca, Tajer worked with brands including Off-White and consulted for Supreme and other streetwear collectives. Tajer said in 2021, “You know, my dream is to create the new French house. I want Casablanca to be as important as the big houses in 20, 30 years' time.”

== Collections ==
Casablanca presented its first full collection during the January 2019 Paris fashion season.

In 2021, the house formally launched its Autumn/Winter 2021 womenswear line During the Spring-Summer 2023 season, Casablanca’s collections incorporated motifs drawn from Mexican landscapes and artisanal traditions. For the SS23 runway, Future Optimiso, critics praised the designs for resembling 70s ‘Vaqueros’ cowboy culture, mentioning the pieces drawing on Mexican cultural references and celebrated the “brand’s unapologetic flamboyance”, though some concerns were raised regarding the ethics of including live animals on the runway.

Later in 2023, the Autumn-Winter 2023 collection drew on the experiences and resilience of communities in Syria.

The Spring-Summer 2024 season drew on Nigeria and was showcased on Nigerian Independence Day. Reviewers noted that its recurring tennis-inspired motifs risked monotony and lacked an innovative angle to the significant day for Nigeria.

The AW24 ‘Venus as a Boy’ collection, inspired by Ancient Rome, was highlighted for its “Mediterranean meets après-sport approach with references to the Eternal City’s art and architecture.” Critics pointed out that the androgynous power of the title, in reference to Björk’s song, did not quite match the designs.

The SS25 Los Angeles-themed collection was noted for its vibrant and layered inclusions, and exploration of iconic Californian cultures, though critics flagged potential risks of cultural appropriation. The SS26 collection shifted toward wearable, everyday luxury, blending Casablanca’s characteristic energy with a palette that was “bright but controlled.”

== Retail ==
In June 2025, Casablanca opened its first flagship store at 62 Rue du Faubourg Saint‑Honoré in Paris. Tajer saw this as Casablanca moving from being digitally native to a direct-to-consumer environment, calling it a “real milestone” for his brand’s growth.

Later in 2025, Casablanca opened its second global flagship in Beverly Hills at 469 North Canon Drive, occupying a historic early‑20th‑century structure characterised by classical motifs. Casablanca Paris operates in over 300 luxury retailers, including Harvey Nichols and Selfridges.
