= Neapolitan tailoring =

Tailoring style

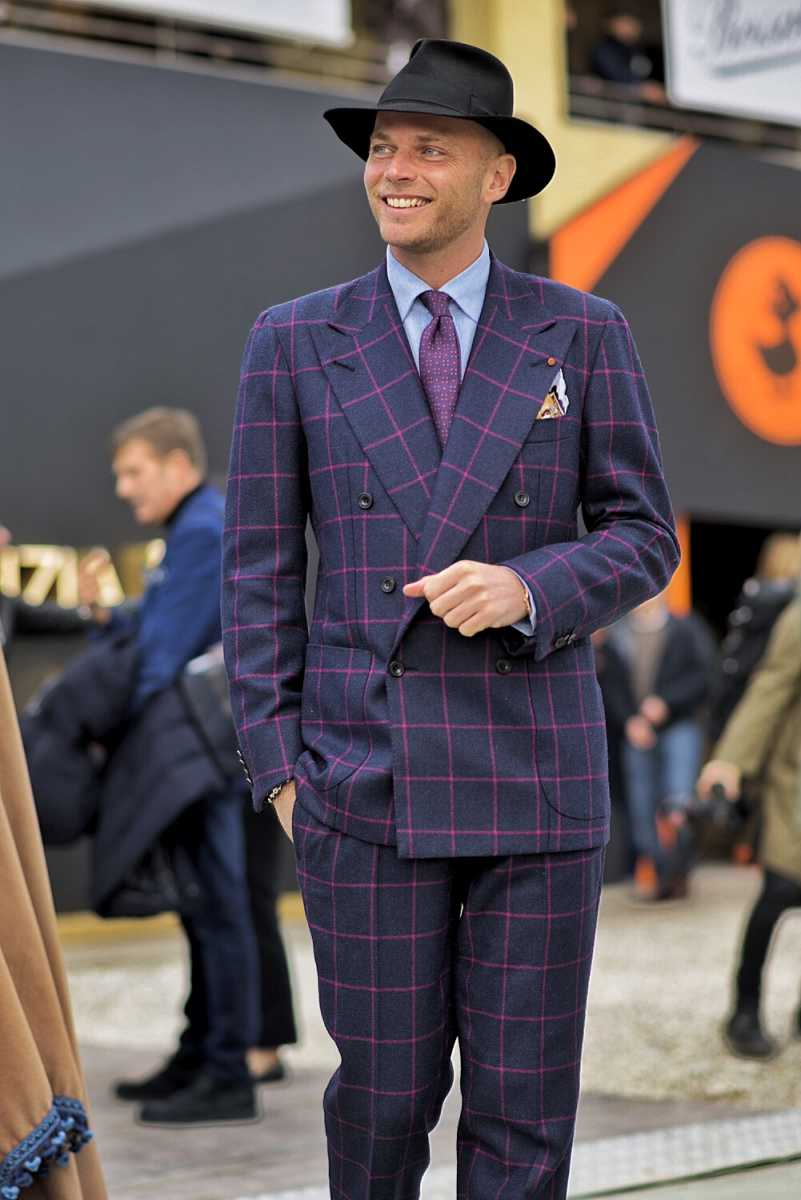
Luca Rubinacci in a Neapolitan bespoke suit at Pitti Uomo.

Neapolitan tailoring is a style of men's tailoring that originated in Naples, Italy, in the early 20th century. It is characterized by a lightweight construction, natural shoulder, minimal padding, and an emphasis on comfort and fluidity. Developed as a response to the structured and formal British Savile Row tailoring, Neapolitan tailoring reflects the local climate, culture, and relaxed lifestyle of southern Italy. It has since become an influential school of menswear design, recognized for its artisanal quality and understated elegance.

== History ==
Neapolitan tailoring takes its roots in the late 19th century, with early innovators like the Mele brothers and Raffaele Sardonelli establishing Naples as a hub for fine menswear. In the 1920s, a distinct style took form through tailors such as Antonio Caggiula and Vincenzo Attolini, who rejected the heavy British model in favour of unstructured, lighter jackets suited to Naples' climate and lifestyle. This led to the creation of the Neapolitan jacket.

By the 1950s, designers like Fausto Sarli and Mario Valentino brought Neapolitan fashion to international prominence through events like Giorgini's Florence shows and the 1954 "Congress of Fashion" in Naples. Vincenzo's son, Cesare Attolini, helped to promote the Neapolitan silhouette beyond Italy.

== Characteristics ==
- Shoulders: the Neapolitan jacket has no shoulder padding. Neapolitan tailors removed the shoulder padding from their jackets to provide more movement freedom. For this reason, the Neapolitan shoulder on informal jackets is sewn like a shirt sleeve (Italian: spalla a camicia), and it follows the natural curve of the human body rather than giving it shape. This type of sleeve is cut about 10 cm larger than the armhole, and it can be finished with the repecchia – that shirring the tailor creates with the extra fabric. This little flair is known as manica a mappina and gives the jacket a "rugged" appearance. For formal occasions, the Neapolitan shoulder features a rollino – a little roll of padding that raises the sleeve head to drape more cleanly.
- Sleeves: the Neapolitan sleeve is shorter than that found on other jackets, as Neapolitans like shirt cuffs to show right above their wrists, especially when adorned with cuff-links. The sleeves are cut closer to the arms to avoid extra fabric hanging when these are raised.
- Pockets: the pockets of a Neapolitan jackets are curved and applied as patches; the breast pocket is called a barchetta, which means "little boat", due to the higher top corner of the pocket, which, along with the rounded bottom, gives it the shape of a stylized boat. The side pockets are equally curved, and their shape recalls that of a pot; hence the name a pignata. Neither feature has any practical functionality, but they are particular to Neapolitan tailoring and contribute to the look of a jacket made in Naples. Double-hand finished stitching may also run throughout the sides of the patch pockets – a recurring feature in informal Neapolitan tailoring.
- Lining: lining is considered an unnecessary burden, and the Neapolitan tailors keep it as minimal as possible. Usually, the jacket is unlined or only half lined; even the sleeves are entirely unlined, as they're meant to fit closely. Additionally, the lining is often left open (volante, literally "flying") so that people can admire the fine details and construction of the jacket.
- Lapels: Neapolitan jackets are famous for their wide lapels, which are often peaked (a punta) for double-breasted jackets, formal jackets, and coats. The risvolto dentellato (the "classic" style of lapels – not peaked) is wider in Neapolitan jackets: they can be as wide as 4 inches (compared to the 3 inches of a regular lapel width). Just as is the case for the pockets, the Neapolitan lapel features double stitching running along the sides – a peculiar detail of a Neapolitan creation – although reserved for the less formal pieces. The scollo a martiello (literally "hammer neck") is the opening of the jacket over the shirt, which in Neapolitan tailoring is parallel to the lapels. The cran is the space that separates the lapel and the neck, and it is usually higher in Neapolitan tailoring to create the illusion of a more slender figure.
- Body: Neapolitan jackets tend to be shorter in the back; in Neapolitan dialect, they say the jacket zompa arrèto, which roughly translates as "it jumps in the back". This characteristic allows the jacket to "slide" gracefully along the body. The vents on the sides are pretty deep in Neapolitan jackets – up to 12 inches. The darts in the front goes all the way down to help the fabric follow the shape of the body and create elegant quarters.
- Buttons and buttonholes: the three-roll-two construction features a lapel that hides the third button to provide extra freedom of movement thanks to a longer opening in the front. The buttonhole on the lapel is called occhiello in Italian, and it means "little eye" to its elongated almond shape. There isn't a tradition for a specific type of buttonhole in Naples, but there is a tendency of Neapolitan tailors to prefer slightly shorter and thicker buttonholes that resemble those of a shirt, while "regular" buttonholes of English tradition are more elongated and slender. Some tailors add a slight teardrop shape at the end of the buttonhole, an aesthetic choice that does not refer to a particular tradition. The buttons on the sleeves are always working and overlapping buttons.

== Tailors and brands ==
Prominent bespoke tailors based in Naples include Pino Peluso, Panico, Zizolfi, Manna, Solito, Dalcuore, Pirozzi, Caliendo, Ciardi, Sabino, Ambrosi, and Rubinacci.

Neapolitan ready-to-wear brands include Cesare Attolini, Kiton, Isaia and Orazio Luciano for tailored garments; Barba, Finamore, D’Avino, Salvatore Piccolo, Borriello, Anna Matuozzo and Luigi Borrelli for shirts; and E. Marinella, F. Marino, Calabrese, E.G. Cappelli, Mario Talarico and Omega Guanti for accessories (ties, gloves, umbrellas).

== See also ==
- Isaia
- Cesare Attolini
- Rubinacci
- Kiton
- E. Marinella
- Savile Row tailoring
