= Rubinacci =

Italian luxury clothing company

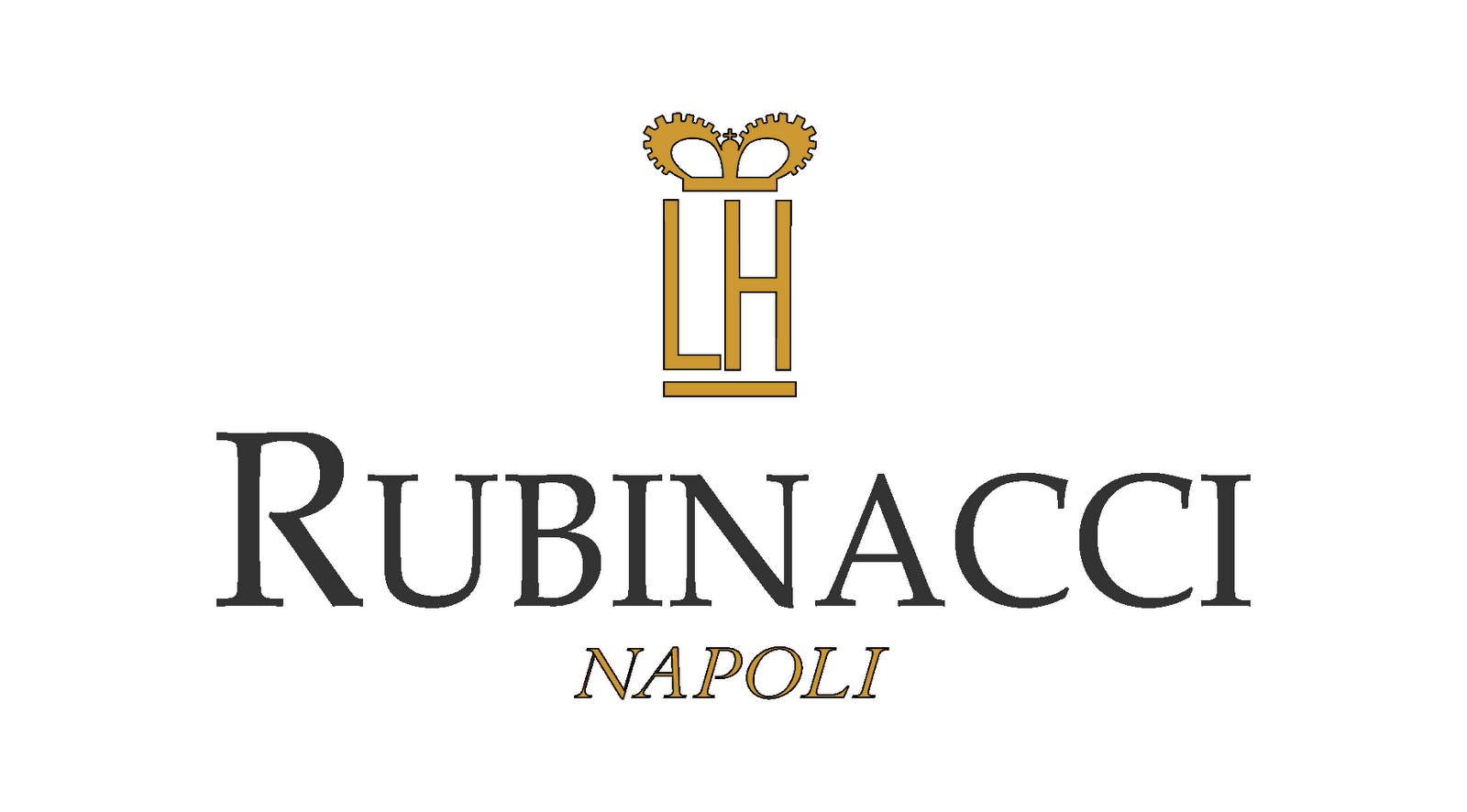
- Type: Family Business
- Industry: Fashion
- Founded: 1932
- Founder: Gennaro Rubinacci
- Headquarters: Naples, Milan and London, Naples, Italy
- Key people: Mariano Rubinacci, Luca Rubinacci
- Products: Men's tailoring, Classic Italian suits
- Services: Bespoke tailoring and RtW collection
- Website: marianorubinacci.com

Rubinacci is an Italian luxury clothing company founded in Naples, Italy in 1932 by Gennaro Rubinacci under the name of the London House. The idea Rubinacci had was to create unstructured, unlined jackets meant to be worn outside of the office. Among his early clients were filmmaker Vittorio De Sica and journalist Curzio Malaparte.

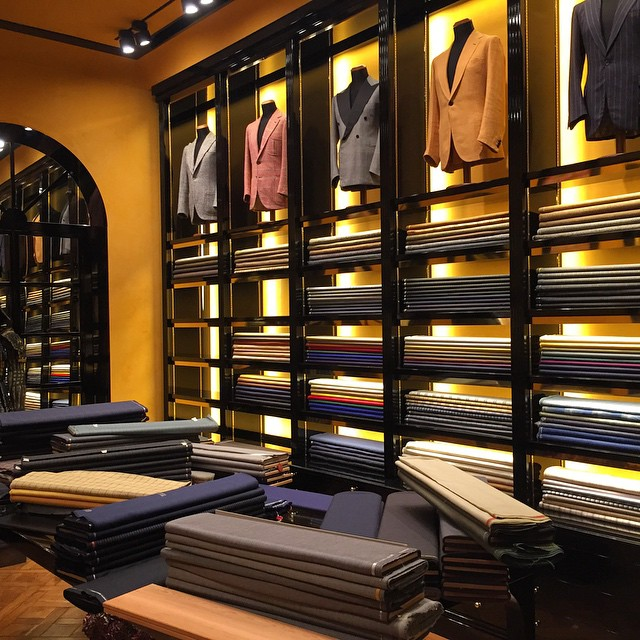
The Rubinacci store in Milano

== History ==
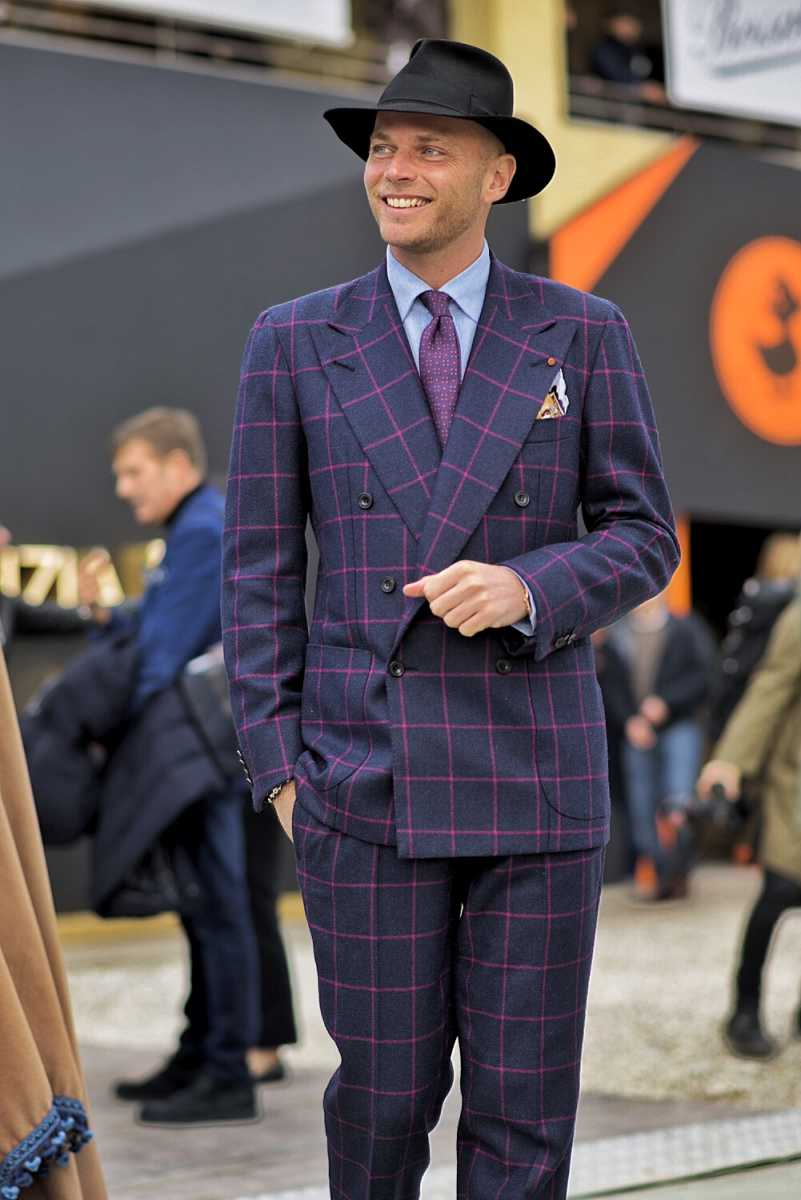
Luca Rubinacci is in charge of the brand’s ready-to-wear category

The history of Rubinacci began with art collector Gennaro Rubinacci's own tailoring emporium; he opened London House, at 25 Via Gaetano Filangieri. In 1961, Gennaro's son, Mariano, took control of the company. In 1963, he changed its name to Rubinacci, maintaining the initials of the original name in the logo. Later, a branch was opened in Milan, in 1989, and in London in 2005.

As of 2018, Luca Rubinacci, Gennaro's grandson, is the creative director of Rubinacci, and responsible for launching the firm's ready-to-wear line.

== Exhibitions and exhibits ==
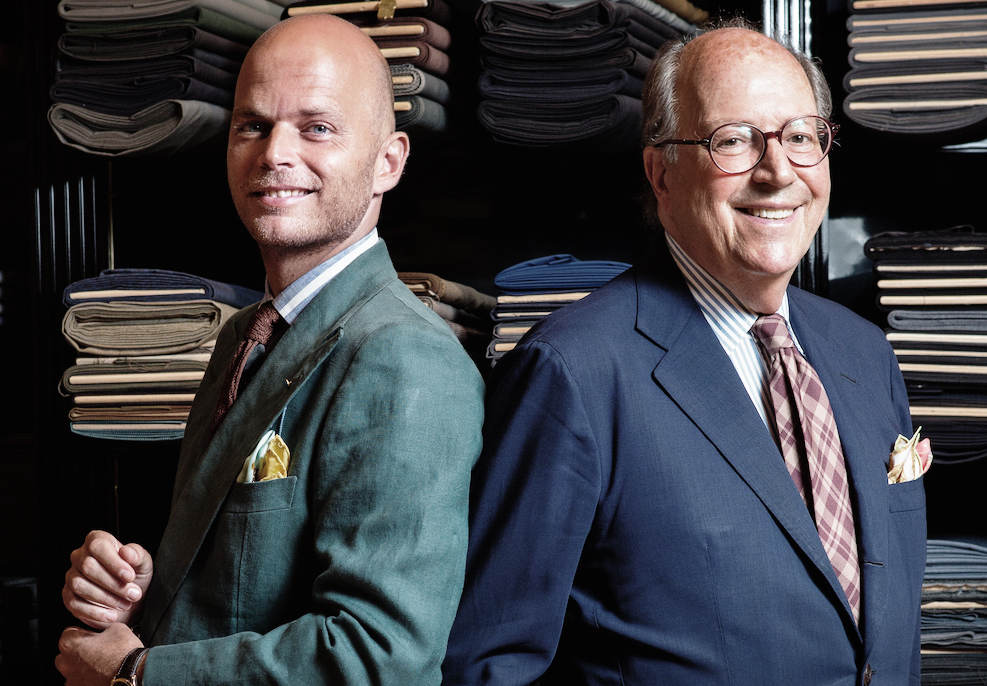
Luca and Mariano Rubinacci represent the second and third generation of the family business

Mariano Rubinacci established a museum of Neapolitan tailoring in Naples, featuring clothes from the 1930s, which has occasionally loaned items to the FIT in New York, and had an exhibition at the Victoria and Albert Museum in 2014.

== See also ==
- Italian fashion
- Made in Italy
- Belvest
- Isaia
- Cesare Attolini
- Kiton
