= Kim Sung-joo (entrepreneur) =

South Korean entrepreneur (born 1956)

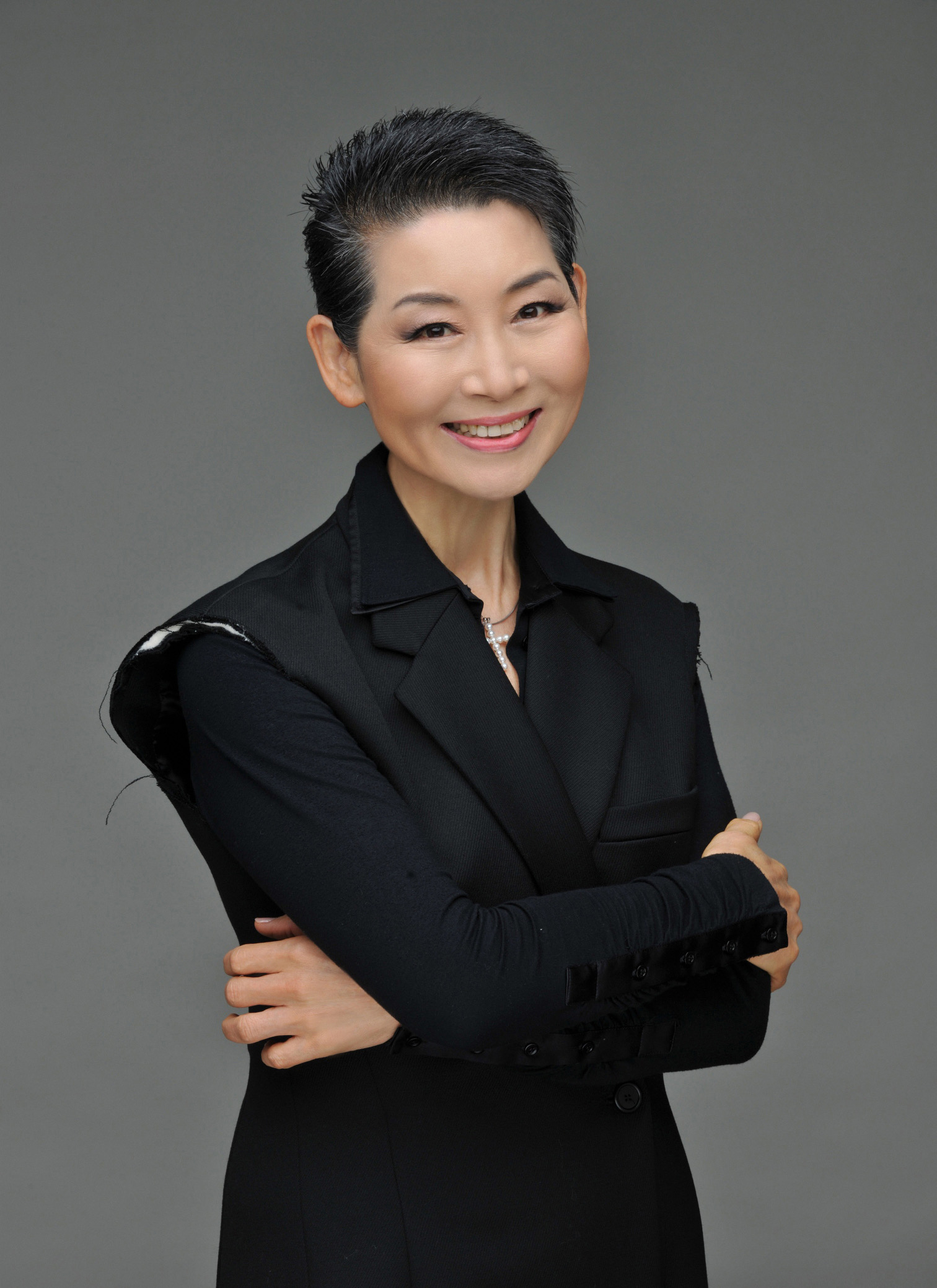
Sungjoo Kim's profile photo taken by Seihon Cho in 2017

Sung-Joo Kim (Korean: 김성주; born 1956 in Daegu, Korea) is a South Korean businesswoman. She is the founder of Sungjoo Group and Chairperson of MCM Holding AG.

Kim is the youngest of six children of Kim Soo-keon, the founder of massive Korean conglomerate Daesung Group.

== Career ==
Sungjoo Group was founded in 1990 and has earned a reputation as Korea's fashion leader having launched the prominent brands including Gucci, Yves Saint Laurent, Sonia Rykiel and Marks & Spencer in the Korean market. In 2005, Sungjoo Group acquired MCM, a German luxury fashion brand founded in Munich in 1976.

Kim served as the President of the Korean Red Cross for three years from 2014. She was awarded an Honorary Officer of the Order of the British Empire (OBE) by Queen Elizabeth II in June 2015 for her contribution to strengthening bilateral ties between the United Kingdom and the Republic of Korea.

== Published works ==
- Kim Sung-joo (2000). Wake Up Call: A Beautiful Outcast. Seoul: Random House Joongang.
- Kim Sung-joo (2002). "Corporate Responsibility and Attitudes Towards Women". In Frank-Jürgen Richter; Pamela Mar (eds.). Recreating Asia: Visions for a New Century. New York: John Wiley. ISBN 978-0470820858.

== Awards ==
- 1997: "Global Leaders for Tomorrow" by World Economic Forum
- 1999: "The 20 Most Powerful International Businesswomen" by Working Woman
- 2001: "7 most powerful women in Asia" by Asiaweek
- 2002: "Pride of Korea Grand Prize Winner" by Korean Press Association
- 2003: "New Century Leaders" by CNN for The Best of Asia
- 2004: "75 Top Powerful Women Around the World" by Bilanz
- 2004: "Woman of the Year Award" from the Korean National Council of Women
- 2005: "Korean Women Leadership Award" for Young Leader, from YWCA Korea
- 2007: "Spirit of Asian America" Gala Honorees by AAFNY (Asian American Federation of New York)
- 2007: "100 People to Enlighten the world 2007" by Korean Green Foundation
- 2008: "WLE Compass Award" by Women's Leadership Exchange
- 2011: Doctor Honoris Causa from Business School Lausanne
- 2015: "Honorary Officer of the Order of the British Empire"

== Personal life ==
Kim attended Amherst College, and later Harvard University. Her father Kim Soo-Keon is the founder of Daesung Group, a South Korean chaebol conglomerate with businesses including energy, auto parts, oil exploration and industrial gas.
