= MCM Worldwide =

German luxury fashion brand

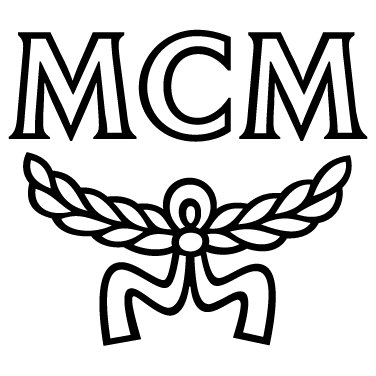

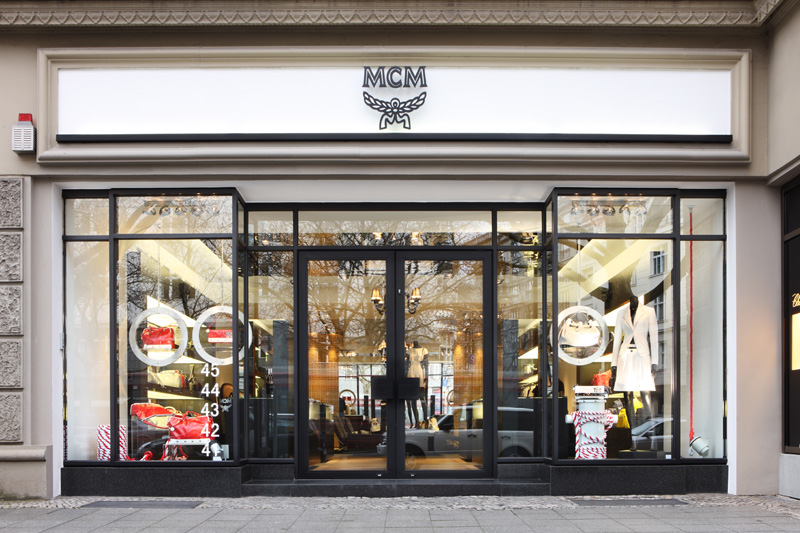
- MCM Store in Berlin
- Industry: Fashion
- Founded: 1976; 50 years ago Munich, Germany
- Founder: Michael Cromer
- Headquarters: Munich, Germany
- Key people: Kim Sung-joo (Chairwoman)
- Parent: Sungjoo Group
- Website: www.mcmworldwide.com

MCM or MCM Worldwide is a luxury fashion house and label originally founded in 1976 by Michael Cromer in Munich. The brand’s signature logo-printed material, called Cognac Visetos, appears on many of its products. Its brass plate insignia is found on all heritage collection bags and most products; each brass plate is identified by a unique number at the bottom.

MCM was bought out in 2005 by Kim Sungjoo of the Daesung Group family. MCM makes roughly 70% of its sales in Asia, and the rest in Europe, the Middle East, and the Americas. MCM sells its products through wholesale accounts, franchises and directly operated stores.

== History ==
The MCM brand became popular during the 1980s for being "ostentatious and flashy". At the height of its popularity in 1993, it owned 250 branches worldwide and recorded sales of $250 million. Following a 1995 investigation of Cromer for alleged tax evasion by German tax authorities, banks and investors lost faith in MCM's financial stability. In 1997, the company was restructured, and its stores and trademark rights were split and sold.

In 2005, the worldwide rights to the MCM brand were acquired from a Swiss financier by Sungjoo Group, a South Korean retail business founded by Sung-Joo Kim, the youngest daughter of Daesung Group magnate Kim Soo-keon. At the time, MCM's global sales stood at $100 million.

Kim Sung-joo hired designer Michael Michalsky and re-launched the brand in 2006 with a new store in Berlin. MCM thereafter reopened stores in New York, Toronto, Paris, London, Singapore, Tokyo, and China among others. In 2011, MCM debuted its largest store in Hong Kong’s Entertainment Building.

On the occasion of the brand's 40th anniversary in 2016, MCM commissioned Tobias Rehberger with a limited-edition capsule collection.

MCM established a Milan design studio in 2017. By 2018, the brand presented its first full-fledged ready-to-wear collection at Pitti Uomo.

In 2018, Dirk Schönberger joined MCM from Adidas, initially as global creative officer; he was promoted to global brand officer in 2022. During his time at the brand, he built a design studio in Berlin to complement its creative centers in Seoul and Milan. He teamed up with Puma in 2018 on a capsule that included footwear, clothing and accessories, and with Crocs in 2022 on a footwear capsule. MCM has had exclusive license agreements with Marchon Eyewear (2015–2023) and Marcolin (since 2023) for the design, production and worldwide distribution of the brand’s eyewear.

In 2019, MCM signed a 10-year licensing agreement with Inter Parfums; the first fragrance, called MCM Eau de Parfum, was launched in 2021.

In 2023, Schönberger left the company, and in June 2023, MCM announced the dual appointment of Tina Lutz as Global Creative Lead and Katie Chung as Creative Director. Lutz is based in the brand's Milanese design studio, while Chung works in Seoul.

Previously, Chung was creative director of South Korean menswear brand Wooyoungmi. Lutz's prior experience includes time at Issey Miyake and Calvin Klein as well as cofounding a womenswear brand and launching a handbag line.

=== List of creative directors ===
- Michael Michalsky, 2006–2013
- Adrian Josef Margelist, 2013–2016
- Dirk Schönberger, 2018–2023
- Tina Lutz and Katie Chung, 2023-Present

== Marketing ==
For its advertising campaigns, MCM has been working with renowned photographers including Herb Ritts (1996), Daniel Sannwald (2015), Juergen Teller (2023), Craig McDean (2024) and Collier Schorr (2024). Campaigns have featured Cindy Crawford (1996, 2023), Billie Eilish (2019), Iann Dior (2022), Lindsay Lohan (2023), Cara Delevingne (2024) and Matt Dillon (2024).

== Gallery ==
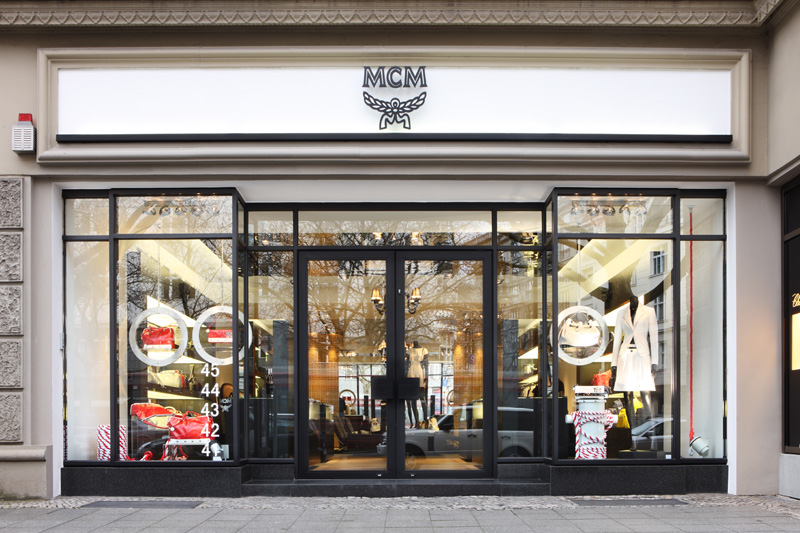
MCM Store in Berlin

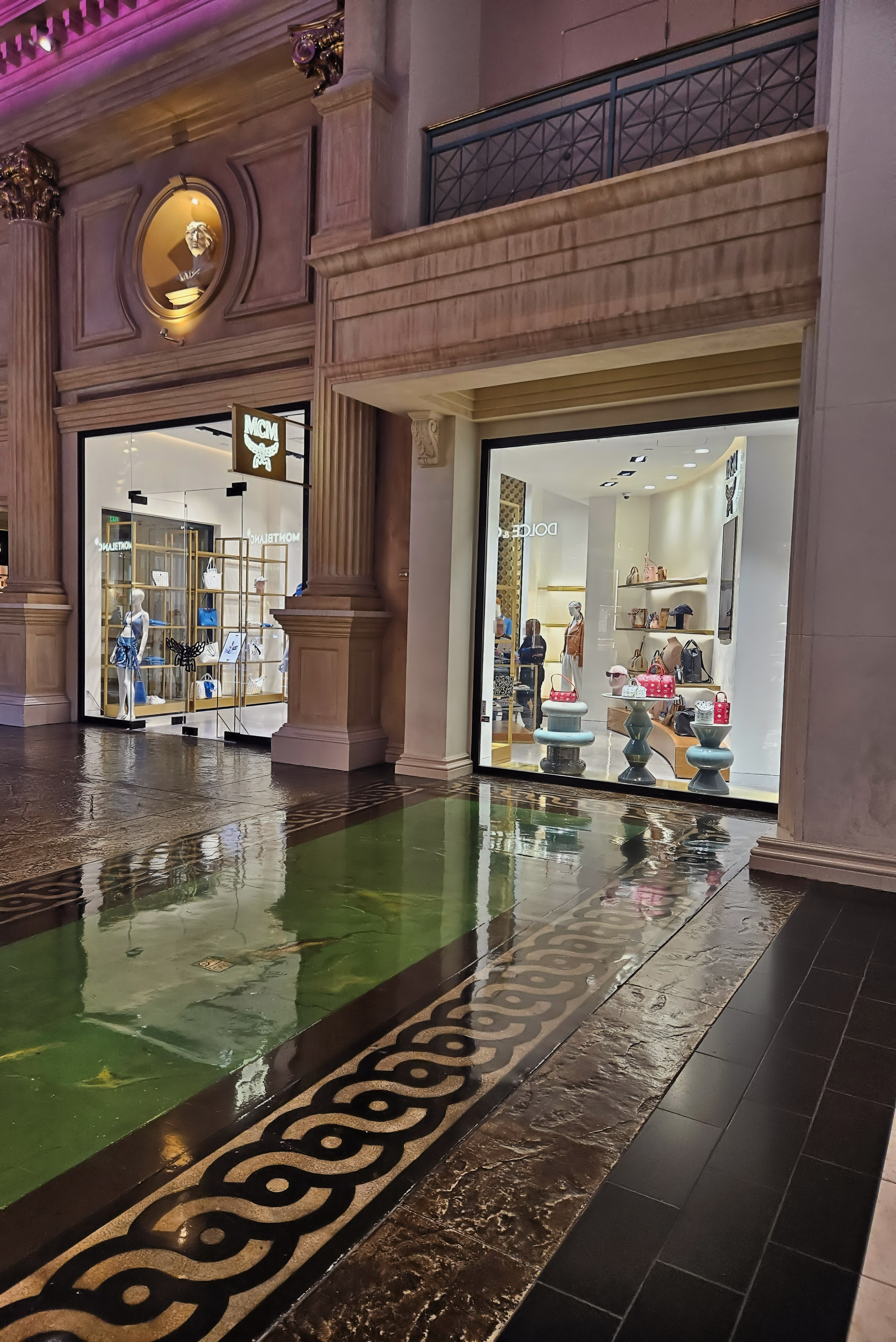
MCM Store in Las Vegas

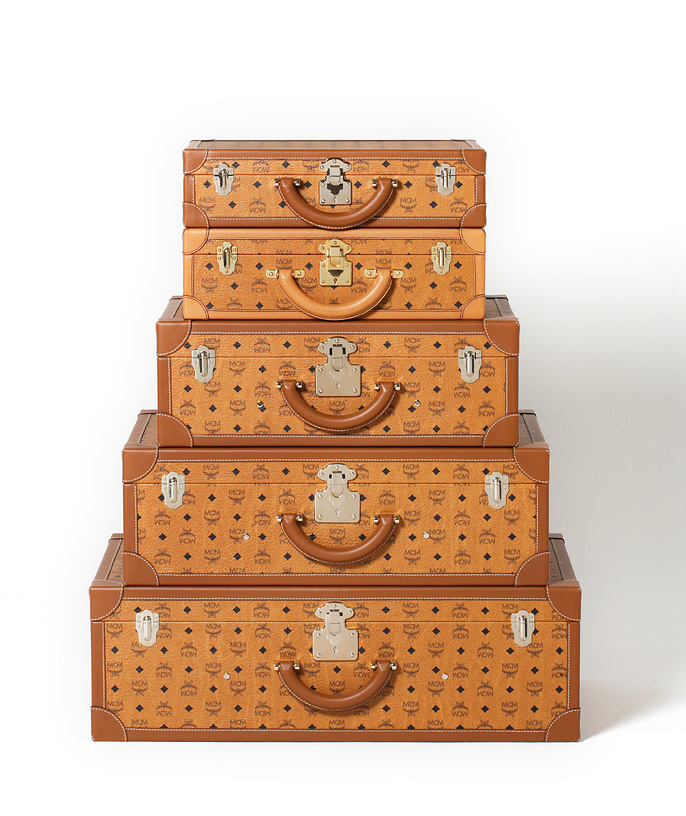
MCM Heritage Cognac Visitors Travel Collection

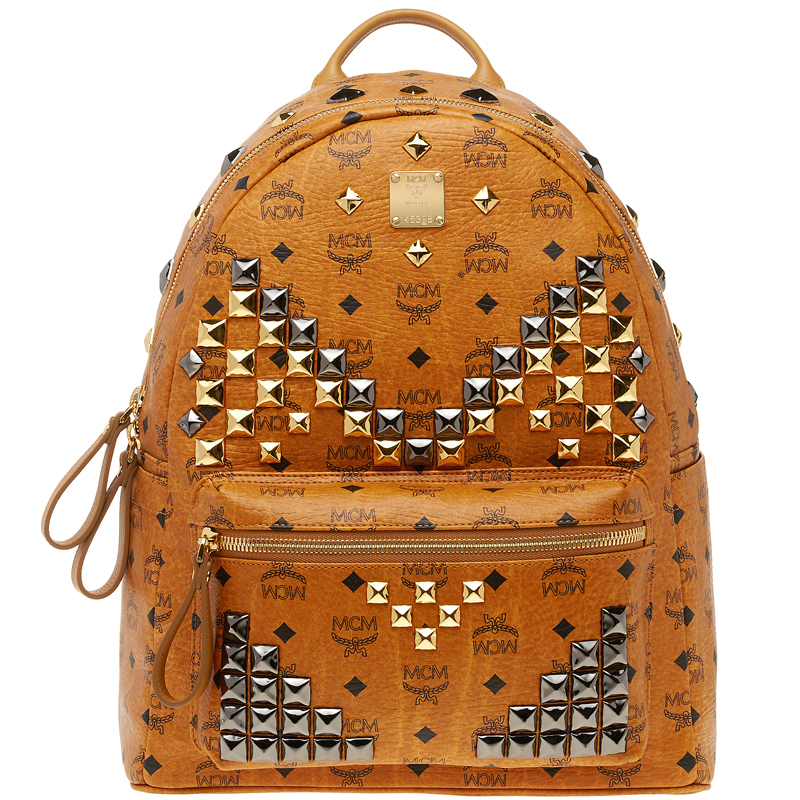
MCM Stark Backpack in Cognac Visetos
