= Mass affluent =

Category of wealthy individuals

In marketing and financial services, mass affluent and emerging affluent are the high end of the mass market, or individuals with, in 2004 terms, US$100,000 (equivalent to $170,455 in 2025) to US$1,000,000 (equivalent to $1,704,545 in 2025) of liquid financial assets plus an annual household income over US$75,000 (equivalent to $127,841 in 2025).

Mass affluent consumers are an important target market for sellers of luxury goods.

== Difference from upper middle income ==
There may be a high correlation between the households in the upper-middle reaches of the income strata and the mass affluent, but there are differences. Social class is the result of a person's function within society rather than merely the income of the household in which he or she resides. Both terms refer to people whose wealth or income is above the average, yet below the top. As opposed to households with above average incomes the mass affluent are also defined through liquid assets such as stocks, bonds, cash, and mutual funds. Fixed assets such as real estate are not commonly counted. This is because liquid assets provide more financial flexibility, which is a desirable trait in customers.

The mass affluent have been characterized as those who save more than they spend and invest for their future. While they worry about funding their children's college education, they realize other savings and loan options exist and they are not opposed to their children paying some part of their educational costs. The mass affluent generally may worry about replacing their paycheck in retirement, and may need to be encouraged to spend more money during their retirement years. They often wish to leave an inheritance to their children. The mass affluent will have between US$500,000 and $1.5 million in investable assets upon retirement with a net worth between $500,000 and $2.5 million. They spend between $4,000 and $10,000 per month in retirement.

== In the United States ==
This graph shows the percentage of "Mass affluent" Americans.

In the United States there are roughly 33 million mass affluent households, and they own roughly 37% of America's liquid financial assets. Among family households, approximately thirty percent could be described as being mass affluent.

2005 Wealth Distribution of Mass Affluent Households
Asset Class	Percentage
Principal Residence	23%
Investment Real Estate	14%
Liquid Financial Assets	22%
Pension and Employee Retirement Plans	16%
Insurance and Annuities	9%
Privately Held Business	16%

== See also ==
- Affluence in the United States
- High-net-worth individual
- Income in the United States
- Income quintiles
- Luxury good
- Status brand
- The professional/managerial middle class
- Wealth in the United States
