= Santa Maria Assunta, Riola di Vergato =

Church in Riola di Vergato, Italy

Coordinates: 44.2293°N 11.0546°E

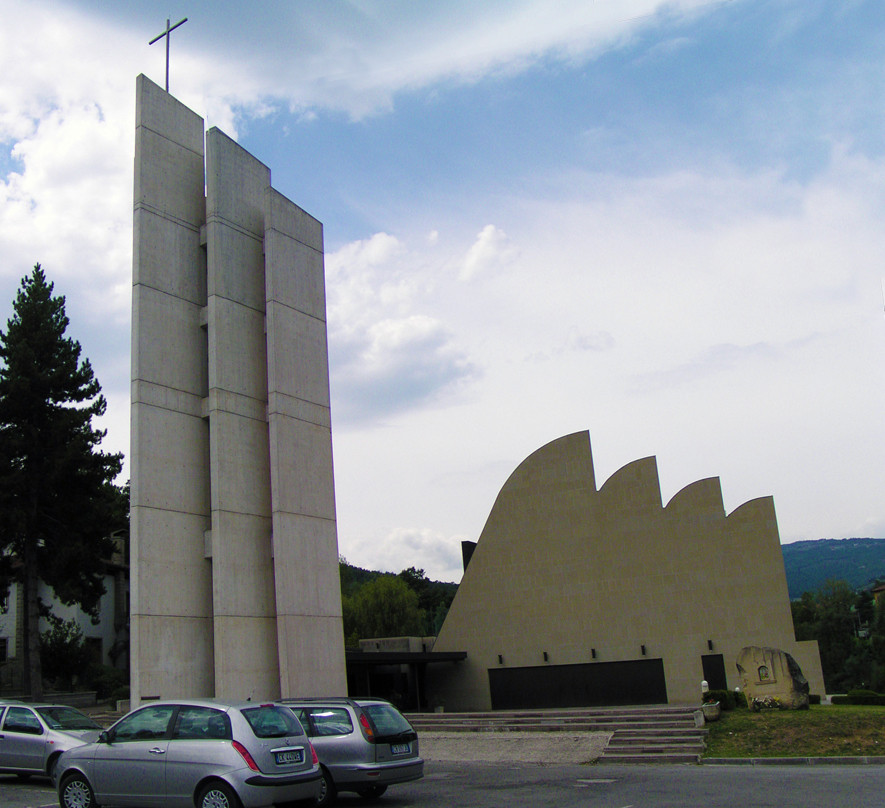
East Facade

Santa Maria Assunta ("Assumption of Mary") is a Catholic church located in Riola di Vergato, northern Italy. It was designed by Finnish modernist architect Alvar Aalto.

== History ==
The design of the project began in 1965–66. The Archbishop of Bologna, Cardinal Giacomo Lercaro secured Aalto's participation upon seeing his work in an exhibition in Florence at the Palazzo Strozzi. Lercaro had also commissioned architects Kenzo Tange and Le Corbusier to design churches in his domain. Because both Aalto and Lercaro died in 1976, and only some portions of the project masterplan were completed, this work could be considered posthumous. Construction began in 1975. The church was consecrated in 1978. The Campanile was completed as late as 1993.

== Architecture ==
The church is structured by six asymmetric prefabricated concrete frames, or arches in descending size towards the chancel. They support a series of prefabricated light scoops, which are conic sections, giving the church its distinctive exterior profile, which some liken to an abstraction of the local Apennine mountains. The facades are faced with mortared stone, and the roof is copper sheeting. The interior is mostly whitewashed plaster, which advantageously reflects northern light brought in from the scoops above. Wooden pews, each slightly shorter in length than the preceding one as they approach the chancel are placed on the terra cotta tile floors. The altar is unadorned and hewn from a single block of marble. The tabernacle was also designed by Aalto, although it is not in its original location. A slightly sunken hexagonal baptistery is appended to the northwest corner of the church, that has a large pyramidal skylight placed over the baptismal font as well as a vertical slit window viewing the river Reno, which flows by the church to the north. The architecture references both the distinctive light fixtures Aalto designed as well as his bent plywood furniture produced by his company Artek.
