= The Bridge (brand) =

Italian leather goods brand

- Industry: Leather goods
- Founded: 1969 in Scandicci, Italy
- Founders: Fiorenza Benvenuti, Fernando Biagioni, Roberto Boncinelli, Andrea Ferri, Arturo Senserini
- Headquarters: Scandicci, Italy
- Products: Bags, luggage, small leather goods
- Revenue: ▲€35.1 million (FY 2024/25)
- Parent: Piquadro S.p.A.
- Website: www.thebridge.it

The Bridge, formerly known as Il Ponte Pelletteria, is an Italian premium leather goods brand founded in Scandicci, Metropolitan City of Florence, in 1969, known for its use of vegetable-tanned leather and artisanal Tuscan craftsmanship. It has been part of the Piquadro Group since 2016.

== History ==
Originally trading as Il Ponte Pelletteria, the company was established in 1969 in Scandicci by five Florentine leather goods craftsmen: Fiorenza Benvenuti, Fernando Biagioni, Roberto Boncinelli, Andrea Ferri and Arturo Senserini. The company adopted the name The Bridge in 1975 and in 1987 relocated its manufacturing to the industrial district of Scandicci.

In January 2015 the brand made its debut at Pitti Immagine Uomo. The following year Piquadro S.p.A. acquired an 80% stake in Il Ponte Pelletteria S.r.l. for €3.175 million, completing the transaction in December 2016. Piquadro exercised its option over the remaining 20% in 2022, bringing its ownership to 100%.

For the financial year ended 31 March 2025, The Bridge reported revenues of €35.1 million, up 2.9% year-on-year.
