= Gaggio Montano =

- Comune
- Comune di Gaggio Montano
- Location within Italy Location within Emilia-Romagna
- Coordinates: 44°12′N 10°56′E
- Country: Italy
- Region: Emilia-Romagna
- Metropolitan city: Bologna (BO)
- Frazioni: Affrico, Abetaia, Bombiana, Marano sul Reno, Pietracolora, Rocca Pitigliana, Silla, Santa Maria Villiana

Government
  - Mayor: Giuseppe Pucci (centre)

Area
  - Total: 58.67 km^{2} (22.65 sq mi)
- Elevation: 682 m (2,238 ft)

Population (31 August 2017)
  - Total: 4,838
  - Density: 82.46/km^{2} (213.6/sq mi)
- Demonym: Gaggesi
- Time zone: UTC+1 (CET)
  - Summer (DST): UTC+2 (CEST)
- Postal code: 40041
- Dialing code: 0534
- Website: Official website

Gaggio Montano (Medial Mountain Bolognese: Gâg) is a comune (municipality) in the Metropolitan City of Bologna in the Italian region Emilia-Romagna, located about 45 kilometres (28 mi) southwest of Bologna.

Gaggio Montano borders the following municipalities: Castel d'Aiano, Castel di Casio, Grizzana Morandi, Lizzano in Belvedere, Montese, Alto Reno Terme, Vergato.

== Economy ==
Piquadro, a leather goods company, is headquartered in the municipality.

Saeco, a household durables manufacturer, a subsidiary of Philips is headquartered in the municipality.

== Twin towns ==
- Sauveterre, France
