= Antonio Berardi =

British fashion designer of Sicilian descent (born 1968)

- Born: 1968 (age 57–58); Grantham, Lincolnshire, England, United Kingdom
- Education: Central Saint Martins, class of 1993
- Occupation: Fashion designer
- Labels: Antonio Berardi; Extè
- Awards: Harper's Bazaar Dress of the Year 2009
- Website: antonioberardi.com

Antonio Berardi (born 1968) is a British fashion designer of Sicilian descent, known especially for his dresses. He currently shows his collection at London fashion week, but has shown at Milan and Paris in the past.

== Early life and career ==
Berardi was born in Grantham, Lincolnshire. His parents were Sicilians who emigrated to Britain in the 1950s. He developed an interest in fashion at a young age. As a nine-year-old, he saved his money for Armani shirts with leather gusset shoulders. After secondary school, he decided on a career in design and, after attending Lincoln College of Art and Design, began working as an assistant to John Galliano. In 1990, he applied to Central Saint Martins (for a third time) and was accepted to the programme led by Wendy Dagworthy.

== Aesthetic and influences ==
Berardi is known for his "sensual, figure-hugging dresses" and a "striking, classical, dressed-up" style featuring "advanced fabrics and manufacturing techniques." He has named music, independent film, post-modern art, Catholic symbolism, Italian art and culture, urban street style, lingerie, and the female form as his design influences.

In Milan in 2003, he showed a coat illuminated with light bulbs that lit up to form a crucifix. He designed the trompe-l'œil corset black-and white dress with lace detailing worn by Gwyneth Paltrow in November 2008 at the premiere of the film Two Lovers, named "Dress of the Year" for 2009 by Harper's Bazaar magazine.
