= Lancel =

Lancel may refer to:

== People ==
- Andrew Lancel (born 1970), English actor
- Edmond Lancel (1888–1959), Belgian chess master
- Serge Lancel (1928–2005), French archaeologist
- Lancel Victor de Hamel (1849–1894), Australian politician

== Other uses ==
- Lancel (company), a French leather goods company
- Lancel Lannister, a fictitious character in A Song of Ice and Fire and Game of Thrones
