= Castel d'Aiano =

- Comune
- Comune di Castel d'Aiano
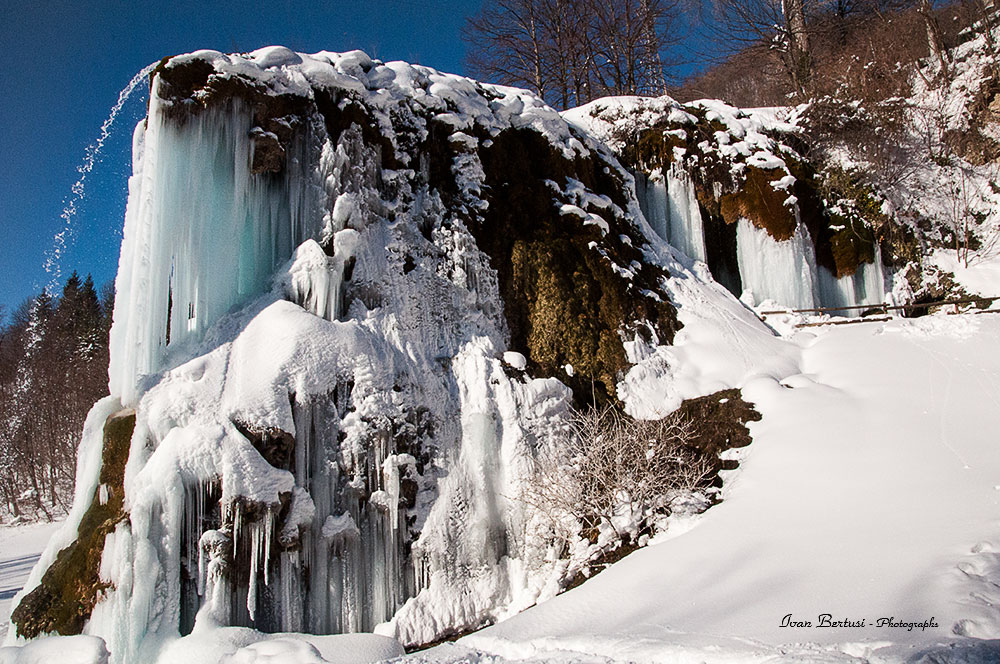

- Location within Italy Location within Emilia-Romagna
- Coordinates: 44°16′N 11°0′E
- Country: Italy
- Region: Emilia-Romagna
- Metropolitan city: Bologna (BO)

Government
  - Mayor: Salvatore Argentieri

Area
  - Total: 45.3 km^{2} (17.5 sq mi)
- Elevation: 805 m (2,641 ft)

Population (31 May 2017)
  - Total: 1,857
  - Density: 41.0/km^{2} (106/sq mi)
- Time zone: UTC+1 (CET)
  - Summer (DST): UTC+2 (CEST)
- Postal code: 40034
- Dialing code: 051
- Website: Official website

Castel d'Aiano (Medial Mountain Bolognese: Castèl d'Ajàn) is a comune (municipality) in the Metropolitan City of Bologna in the northern Italian region of Emilia-Romagna, located in the Apennine Mountains about 35 kilometres (22 mi) southwest of Bologna.

Castel d'Aiano borders the following municipalities: Gaggio Montano, Montese, Vergato, Zocca.

In April 1945 during Operation Craftsman, near Castel d'Aiano, Bob Dole was wounded by a German shell that struck his right arm. Dole's heroic actions during World War II in Castel d'Aiano earned him local folk hero status, and he made regular trips back to the village until his death in 2021.
