= Sidney Toledano =

French-Moroccan businessman (born 1951)

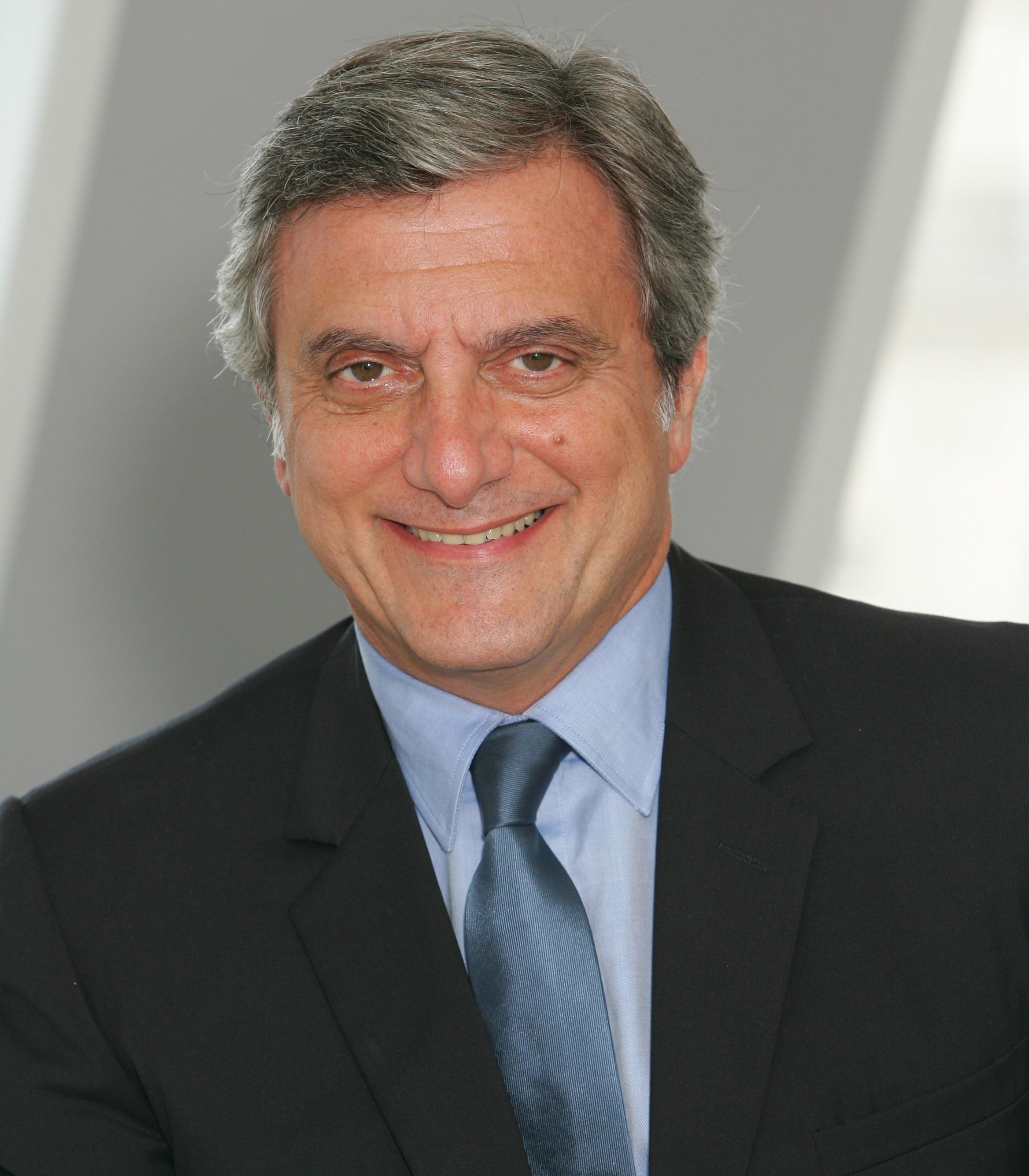
- Sidney Toledano
- Born: July 25, 1951 (age 75); Casablanca, Morocco
- Education: École Centrale Paris
- Occupation: Businessman
- Spouse: Katia Assous (m. 1981)

Sidney Toledano (born 25 July 1951 in Casablanca, Morocco) is a French-Moroccan businessman, He has been the CEO of LVMH Fashion Group since February 2018 and former CEO of Fashion House Dior.

== Family ==
Sidney Toledano was born in Casablanca, Morocco, into a Moroccan Jewish family. He is the son of late Boris Toledano, a former entrepreneur and President of the Jewish community of Casablanca, and Ines Benezra. He married Katia Assous the 3rd of July 1981 and they have three children together.

== Education and career ==
He graduated from École centrale Paris in 1976, where he focused on applied mathematics. He started his career as a marketing consultant at Nielsen International, which led to a temporary assignment in Brazil. He then joined Kickers in 1982, initially serving as general secretary, before being appointed CEO at Lancel.

He left Lancel in 1993 and was invited by Bernard Arnault to join Christian Dior Couture to develop the marroquinerie department. He became the CEO of Dior in 1998 and, in February 2018, became the CEO of LVMH Fashion Group, which includes many fashion brands like Givenchy, Emilio Pucci, Marc Jacobs, Kenzo, etc.

== Honours ==
He is the vice-president and administrator of the Institut Français de la Mode et du Comité Colbert. He is member of the Comité de Direction de la Chambre Syndicale de la Haute Couture and of the Fédération française de la couture. He presided the Chambre syndicale de la mode masculine from 2014 to 2019.

He was awarded Chevalier dans l’Ordre National de la Légion d’Honneur and Officier dans l’ordre national du Mérite in France. He has also been awarded the Wissam Al-Arch to the grade of Officer by the King Mohammed VI of Morocco in 2007.
