= Asian American Federation of New York =

US nonprofit organization

The Asian American Federation is a nonprofit organization working to advance the civic voice of Asian Americans in the New York metropolitan area. Established in 1989, the Asian American Federation of NY supports and collaborates with 70 member and partner agencies to improve quality of life and support philanthropy in the Asian American community. Organizations with which the Asian American Federation of New York works include Asian Americans for Equality, the Chinese-American Planning Council, MinKwon Center for Community Action, and the New York Asian Women's Center.

In 2007, the Asian American Federation of New York won a National Leadership in Action Award from the W. K. Kellogg Foundation. That same year, it was among over 530 New York City arts and social service institutions to receive part of a $30 million grant from the Carnegie Corporation, which was made possible through a donation by New York City Mayor Michael Bloomberg. Since 2002, the Carnegie Corporation has donated more than $115 million.

Annually, the Federation hosts the Spirit of Asian American Gala, an event that recognizes Asian American individuals who have made a substantial contribution to society. The honorees for the 2007 Spirit of Asian American Gala were Arvind Raghunathan, Sung-Joo Kim, Farooq Kathwari, and Haruko Smith.
