= MinKwon Center for Community Action =

Asian American non-profit organization in Queens, New York

The MinKwon Center for Community Action is a nonprofit organization that serves the needs of the Korean American community in New York City. First established as YKASEC in 1984, the MinKwon Center is based in Flushing, Queens, which has a large Korean population. MinKwon focuses in particular on reaching marginalized community members, such as the elderly, recent immigrants, low-income residents, and residents with limited English proficiency.

The MinKwon Center educates and provides services to its members through its primary program areas, which are community organizing and advocacy, social services, civic participation, youth empowerment, and cultural education. These services are provided with the goal of increasing civic participation through community organizing to improving immigrants' rights and quality of life. Because some members of the community it serves are undocumented, the MinKwon Center mobilizes the Korean American community to organize on the issue of immigration reform at the national level as well through efforts such as busing people to the Rally for Immigration Reform and canvassing for the 2010 census.

The name MinKwon comes from the Korean word for civil rights.

== Community advocacy ==
In 2009, the MinKwon Center helped to form the 12% and Growing Coalition, which includes more than 40 Asian Pacific American community organizations. The Asian Pacific American community living in New York City comprises 12% of the population, yet receives less than 1% of government funding. The first-ever coalition comprising organizations that serve diverse ethnic groups among Asian Pacific Americans, the 12% and Growing Coalition advocates that the New York State and City governments pass fair budgets that protect vulnerable Asian Pacific Americans in New York.

== Supporters and recognition ==
The MinKwon Center receives funding and support from individual donors, government, foundations, and corporate sponsors including the Asian American Federation of New York, the Capital One Foundation, the New York Foundation, the New York State Division of Housing & Community Renewal, NYC Department of Youth and Community Development, Robin Hood Foundation, and Verizon Foundation.

The MinKwon Center is a recipient of a 2010 Union Square Award, an initiative of the Tides Center, which recognizes grassroots organizations serving neighborhoods in New York City.

== See also ==
- Koreans in the New York City metropolitan area
