= Status brand =

Status brands are brands that, through association, inherently increase their owner's popularity in a certain community. Unlike luxury brands, status brands are usually available at different price points and thus are available to shoppers of various demographics.

Trendsetters determine the societal and cultural status ultimately associated with a given status brand, often disseminated nowadays through social media. Trendsetters need not be famous, but media promotion often cements a brand's popularity.

Brand strategists Angelito Tan and Daniel Saynt introduced the term as a means of studying the associations between popular brands and top trendsetters. Ranging from apparel to electronics to automobiles, status brands exist across the spectrum of goods available today.
