= Extè =

Italian fashion business

- Industry: Clothing
- Founded: 1996
- Headquarters: Milan, Italy
- Parent: IT Holding Group
- Website: exte.it

Extè is an Italian fashion clothing brand introduced in 1996 by IT Holding Group. The company sells youth ready-to-wear clothing and fashion accessories. Creative director for the brand has been held by: Antonio Berardi, Sergio Ciucci and Alessandro De Benedetti.
