= Vergato =

- Comune
- Comune di Vergato
- Coat of arms

- Location within Italy Location within Emilia-Romagna
- Coordinates: 44°17′N 11°7′E
- Country: Italy
- Region: Emilia-Romagna
- Metropolitan city: Bologna (BO)
- Frazioni: Calvenzano, Castelnuovo, Cereglio, Marano, Pieve Roffeno, Prunarolo, Riola, Susano, Tabina, Tolè,

Government
  - Mayor: Giuseppe Argentieri (Centre-Right)

Area
  - Total: 59.94 km^{2} (23.14 sq mi)
- Elevation: 193 m (633 ft)

Population (31 December 2016)
  - Total: 7,627
  - Density: 127.2/km^{2} (329.6/sq mi)
- Demonym: Vergatesi
- Time zone: UTC+1 (CET)
  - Summer (DST): UTC+2 (CEST)
- Postal code: 40038
- Dialing code: 051
- Website: Official website

Vergato (Medial Mountain Bolognese: Vargà or Varghè) is a comune (municipality) in the Metropolitan City of Bologna in the Italian region Emilia-Romagna, located about 40 kilometres (25 mi) southwest of Bologna.

Vergato borders the following municipalities: Castel d'Aiano, Gaggio Montano, Grizzana Morandi, Marzabotto, Valsamoggia, Zocca.

The town was almost entirely destroyed during the Gothic Line phase of the Italian Campaign in World War II. It is connected to Bologna by the Porrettana railway and by the Porrettana State Road.

== Main sights ==
- Tarots Museum
- Church of the Assumption of Mary, Riola di Vergato
