= Sermoneta Gloves =

Italian glove brand

Sermoneta Gloves is a Rome-based manufacturer, designer, and retailer of high fashion mostly-leather and suede gloves for women and men. The company was founded by artisan Giorgio Sermoneta in 1960.

== Current line ==
As of 2012, amongst their various designs, Sermoneta produces sixty-one separate styles of gloves. Forty-five are women's and sixteen are men's styles. Currently Sermoneta includes these glove-outers:

- Kidskin leather, forty-six styles.
- Deerskin leather, two styles.
- Cashmere wool, one style.
- Sheepskin shearling, two styles.
- Suede, four styles.
- Pigskin leather, two styles.
- Suede back/Kidskin leather palm, two styles.
- Satin, one style.
- Peccary leather, one style.

== Worldwide locations ==
Besides from being purchased online, as of 2012, Sermoneta operates boutiques in the following international cities:

=== Eurasia ===
- Rome, Italy (flagship store)
- Florence, Italy
- Venice, Italy
- Milan, Italy
- Vienna, Austria
- London, United Kingdom
- Moscow, Russia
- Osaka, Japan
- Tokyo, Japan
- Nagoya, Japan

=== North America ===
- New York, New York
- Boston, Massachusetts
- Chicago, Illinois
- Toronto, Canada

== In popular culture ==
- The American singer/songwriter and actress Katy Perry wore yellow Sermoneta fingerless leather gloves for the May 2012 cover of Teen Vogue.
- The fictional character Serena van der Woodsen in Cecily von Ziegesar's 2011 novel Gossip Girl, Psycho Killer wear's taupe-colored Sermoneta kidskin gloves when she sneaks into the home of her friend Nate Archibald.
