= La Toile Daligram =

1972 painting by Salvador Dalí

La Toile Daligram was a work created in 1972 by Spanish Surrealist artist Salvador Dalí.

== History ==
It was in 1970, the year when Dalí offered his wife and muse Gala the Castle of Púbol, the object of a promise made in 1930, that he created a set of graphics and symbols of great beauty and artistic expressiveness, executed in black and gold ink on two pieces of cardboard. This creation is known as Daligrammes and represents the initials of Dalí and Gala as well as symbols that clearly allude to royalty such as the crown and the fleur-de-lis. His line is at once intense and sensual, suggestive, delicate, enigmatic and full of inspiration. Later, as a diversion, Dalí stuck the pieces of cardboard on a Louis Vuitton case as a kind of nod to the use of the monogram as a design element of a luxury brand, elevating it to the category of a work of art.

== See also ==
- List of works by Salvador Dalí
- 1972 in art
