= Daesung Group =

South Korean chaebol

- Native name: Korean: 대성그룹
- Industry: Energy; Auto parts; Oil exploration; Industrial gas
- Founded: 1947
- Founder: Kim Soo-geun
- Headquarters: 6th/11th/12th Floors, Dongduk Building, 68 Ujeongguk-ro, Jongno-gu, Seoul, South Korea
- Key people: Kim Young-hoon
- Website: daesung.co.kr

Daesung Group (Korean: 대성그룹 hanja: 大成) is a South Korean chaebol originally founded as Daesung Industrial Corporation in Daegu in 1947 by Chairman Kim Soo-keun (1915–2001). Beginning with the briquette business with just a dozen employees, the company has since expanded into oil, city gas, renewable energy (solar heat, solar power, wind power, fuel cells, etc.), and environmental energy (LFG, RDF, biogas). Since 2001, the company has been divided into two entities: Daesung Joint Holdings (Chairman Kim Young-dae), centered around Daesung Industrial, and Seoul City Gas Group (Chairman Kim Young-min), operating independently both financially and operationally. The two brothers do not share any business entities, and their sister bought the fashion brand MCM.

Daesung Group's major energy subsidiaries include Daesung Energy Co., Ltd., Daesung Clean Energy Co., Ltd., and Daesung Environmental Energy Co., Ltd.

Since Chairman Kim Young-hoon announced his second founding in 2000, Daesung Group has expanded beyond energy into diverse sectors, including the environment, construction, IT, finance, culture, education, and media. In particular, the group is focusing its investments on cultural content businesses, including IT, publishing, film, broadcasting content, music, games, and animation, centered around its affiliates, including the portal site Korea.com, Daesung Corporation, and Daesung Venture Investment.

== History ==
- May 10, 1947: Daesung Industrial Corporation established.
- September 18, 1959: Daesung Coal Briquette Co., Ltd. established.
- July 10, 1960: Mungyeong Coal Mine acquired.
- April 1964: LPG sales business launched.
- July 4, 1968: Daesung Industrial Co., Ltd. established.
- June 25, 1976: Daesung Mining Development Co., Ltd. established.
- July 19, 1976: Changwon Vaporizer Co., Ltd. established.
- February 19, 1979: Daesung Oxygen Co., Ltd. established (now DIG Air Gas Co., Ltd.)
- November 19, 1980: Daesung Australia subsidiary established.
- March 25, 1982: Daesung USA subsidiary established.
- January 31, 1983: Daegu City Gas Co., Ltd. established. (Currently Daesung Energy Co., Ltd.)
- December 1, 1983: Seoul City Gas Co., Ltd. established.
- July 12, 1997: Gyeongbuk City Gas Co., Ltd. established (now Daesung Clean Energy Co., Ltd.)
- December 28, 2000: Kim Young-hoon inaugurated as Chairman.
- December 19, 2001: Gloria Trading Co., Ltd. established (now Daesung Q Co., Ltd.)
- April 24, 2002: Daesung Haegang Science and Culture Foundation established.
- May 10, 2002: Daesung Clean Energy Research Institute (DICE) opened.
- June 28, 2002: Insight Venture Co., Ltd. acquired (now Daesung Venture Investment Co., Ltd.)
- November 20, 2002: Daesung.com Co., Ltd. established (now Daesung Co., Ltd.)
- December 18, 2002: Establishment of Daesung China Co., Ltd.
- June 18, 2003: Establishment of Daesung Global Network Co., Ltd.
- September 2, 2003: Acquisition of Acts Investment Consulting Co., Ltd. (now Daesung Investment Consulting Co., Ltd.)
- May 24, 2004: Establishment of Daegu Energy Environment Co., Ltd. (now Daesung Environment Energy Co., Ltd.)
- January 20, 2006: Acquisition of Korea.com Communications
- December 5, 2006: Establishment of Neopharm
- February 19, 2007: Establishment of Neopharm Australia
- June 26, 2008: Establishment of Korean Dream Co., Ltd.
- May 8, 2009: Establishment of Daesung E&C Co., Ltd.
- October 1, 2009: Establishment of Daesung Holdings Co., Ltd.
- August 31, 2010: Establishment of Daesung Investment Co., Ltd. (now Daesung Value Investment Co., Ltd.)
- June 13, 2011: Signed domestic business cooperation agreement with Skype
- October 1, 2015: Establishment of Daesung Q Co., Ltd., a subsidiary of Gloria Trading Co., Ltd.

== Affiliates ==
=== Holding Company ===
- Daesung Holdings: Management consulting, M&A, legal affairs, management diagnosis, auditing
  - Education Content Business Division: Korean Federation of Teachers' Associations distance education training program, gifted education program, corporate training, academy e-learning service
  - IT Business Division: Skype service, mobile distribution, mobile telecommunications sales, product solutions, SM business

=== Energy ===
- Daesung Energy (formerly Daegu City Gas)
  - City Gas Business Division: City gas supply, CNG charging station operation
  - Wellbay Business Division: Online sales of eco-friendly agricultural products and wellness products, weekend farm operation
  - Senergy Business Division: District-based community energy business in the Daegu Jukgok District (electricity and heating/cooling supply)
- Daesung Environmental Energy: Landfill gas (LFG) recycling facility operation
- Daesung Clean Energy (formerly Gyeongbuk City Gas): City gas supply
- Daesung Energy Service 1, 2, and 3 (formerly Alpha/Beta/Gamma Service): City gas supply household safety management

=== Cultural Content ===
- Daesung Co., Ltd.: Book publishing
- Korea.com Communications: Internet portal service

=== Finance ===
- Daesung Venture Investment: Financial investment association operation, incubation business
- Daesung Investment Advisory: Financial investment advisory and discretionary investment business

=== Fashion and other businesses ===
- Daesung Global Network
  - CRM Division: Call center outsourcing, talent dispatch, ASP business
- Daesung Q Co., Ltd.: Children's clothing manufacturing and sales (OUR-Q)

=== Overseas Corporations ===
- Neopharm: Apple, kiwi, and peach cultivation (based in New Zealand)
- Neopharm Australia: Macadamia cultivation, farm experience
- Daesung America: Organic almond and walnut cultivation, real estate leasing
- Daesung China: Children's clothing manufacturing, import/export, and sales (OUR-Q)
- Korean Dream: Operation and management of the GEEP project, development of new businesses in Mongolia

=== Non-profit Foundations ===
- Daesung Haegang Science and Culture Foundation: Support for science and technology research organizations, talent development, and sponsorship of science-related projects
- Haegang Daesung Scholarship Foundation: Scholarship programs
