= Belvest =

Italian menswear fashion brand

- Type: Public (S.p.A.)
- Industry: Fashion
- Founded: 1964; 62 years ago
- Headquarters: Piazzola sul Brenta, Italy
- Products: Men's tailoring, Classic Italian suits
- Services: Fashion production, ready to wear, made to measure
- Website: belvest.com

Belvest is an Italian menswear fashion brand founded in 1964 in Piazzola sul Brenta from the desire of the founder to respond to a specific need of the time, the "ready-made garment", without abandoning haute couture. Its 300 employees produce ready-to-wear garments that respect the canons of the sartorial tradition.

== See also ==
- Italian fashion
- Made in Italy
