= Wooyoungmi =

South Korean menswear clothing brand

WOOYOUNGMI
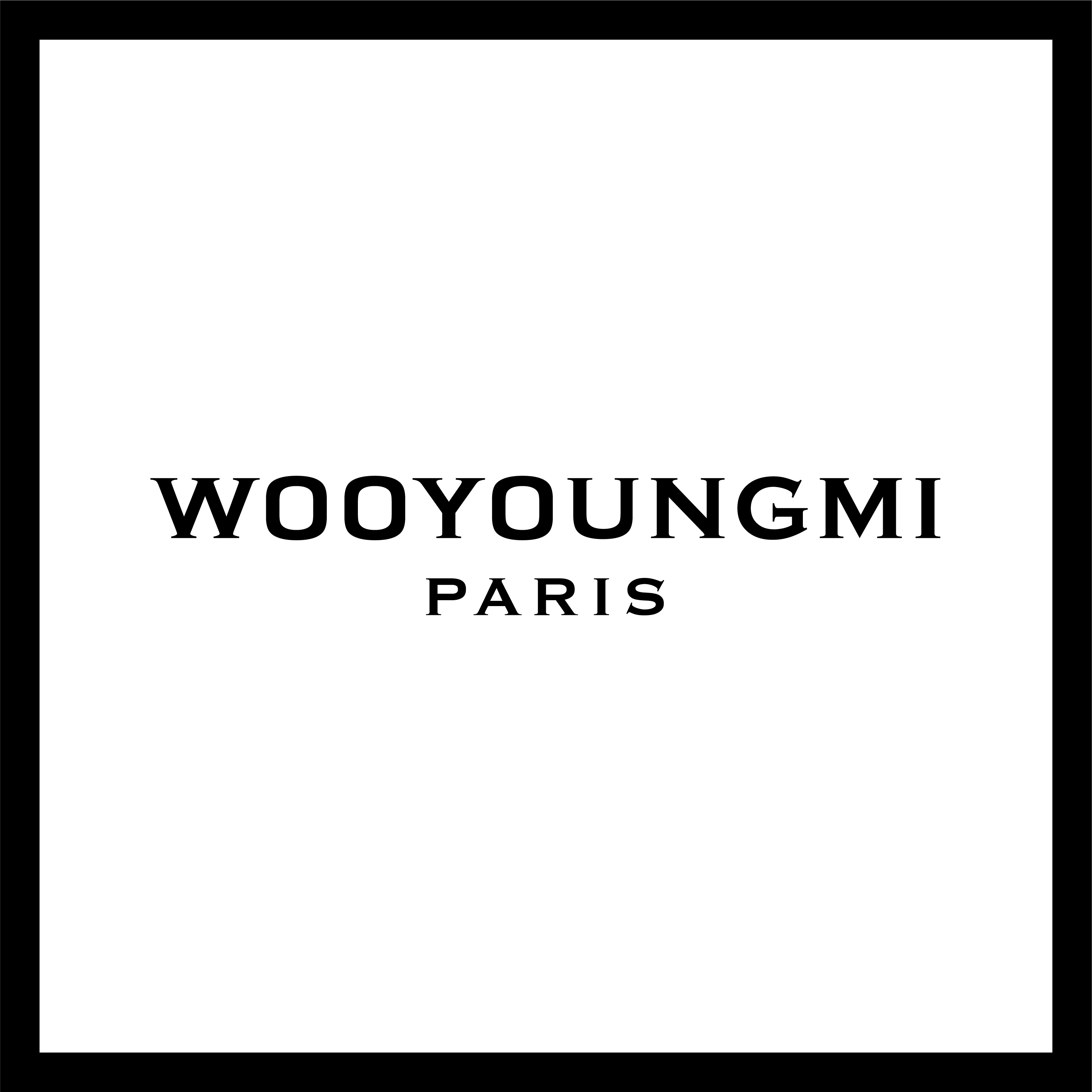
- Type: Private Company
- Industry: Fashion
- Founded: 2002, Paris, France
- Founder: Young-mi Woo
- Headquarters: Seoul, South Korea
- Key people: Katie Chung (Creative Director)
- Products: Apparel and accessories
- Website: www.wooyoungmi.com

Wooyoungmi (sometimes stylised in all caps) is a South Korean menswear clothing brand launched in Paris by the designer Youngmi Woo in 2002. It is sold through own-brand stores and global retailers. Art and architecture are sources of inspiration for the brand. The brand has become known for tailoring. In 2014, The Korea Herald wrote that "Wooyoungmi has become the most successful Korean independent menswear designer brand."

== History ==
Youngmi Woo was born in Seoul, South Korea, in 1959. Her father was the head of an architectural firm, which allowed him to travel extensively, bringing home international magazines, which a young Youngmi studied, growing curious about the world outside Korea. Along with her mother, who taught both art and piano, they did their utmost to use what they had to provide a creative environment for their five children. She took up fashion studies at Sungkyunkwan University in Seoul. On graduating in 1983 she was selected to represent Korea in Japan's Osaka International Fashion Competition, and won. In 1988 Youngmi Woo launched the menswear brand Solid Homme, starting with one shop. Today there are 21 stores opened with Hyundai Group, as well as others with Lotte, Shinsegae and Galleria. In 1993 Woo Youngmi and some young designer friends begin 'New Wave', as a platform for young designers to show their work. This paved the way for today's Seoul Fashion Week. Designer Woo Young-mi founded her eponymous brand Wooyoungmi in 2002. In 2002, Wooyoungmi was launched in Paris. Youngmi wanted to establish a designer brand that allowed her the freedom to design for the vision she holds of her ideal man. Wooyoungmi has shown on the Paris Menswear Week since 2003. In 2011, Wooyoungmi became an official member of La Chambre Syndicale de la Mode Masculine. Also that year the brand collaborated with London department store Selfridges on the event "My Coat, My Gift," Five young London creatives were asked to redesign the brands' best-selling Coat No. 51. The resulting designs were exhibited in a special pop-up at Selfridges, with a percentage of the sales of the coat during the event donated to charity. In 2012, under the art direction of daughter Katie Chung, Wooyoungmi began collaborating with artists for the creation of their advertising campaigns. Artists to have taken part in this project, to name a few, are sculptures Guerra de la Paz and Korean sculpture Osang Gwon with his unique blend of sculpture and photography and painter Clemens Krauss. In June 2014, Wooyoungmi launched a capsule collection with online retailer Mr Porter. In September of that year Woo Youngmi was named one of 500 people shaping the global fashion industry by the Business of Fashion in their 'BoF 500' 2014. Katie Chung, daughter of Woo Youngmi, was announced joint creative director in 2014 and presented her first show in June 2014 for SS15.

In 2014, The Korea Herald wrote that "Wooyoungmi has become the most successful Korean independent menswear designer brand." Founded in the 1980s, as of 2016, the fashion house Solid Corporation consisted of two men's labels: Wooyoungmi and Solid Homme. In 2016, GQ Magazine wrote that "having shown every season in the French capital since 2003 and broken into the western market with high-end stockists such as Selfridges in London and Bon Marché in Paris, Wooyoungmi has established itself arguably as the flagship Korean men's brand in Europe." Founder Woo and her daughter Katie Chung handle design as of 2017.

== Corporate ==
WOOYOUNGMI is part of the private company called Solid Corporation. Youngmi Woo and her family members including her daughter Katie Chung hold the shares of the corporation. Solid corp was founded in 1988 in Seoul, Korea by Youngmi Woo and her younger sister Janghee Woo with their first men's wear brand SOLID HOMME.

== Stores ==
WOOYOUNGMI has 24 stand-alone stores in Asia with one European store in Paris, and is stocked in London's Selfridges, Paris' Le Bon Marché and Marais in Melbourne, Australia.
