= Isaia =

Italian menswear brand

- Type: Private
- Industry: Fashion
- Founded: 1920; 106 years ago Naples, Italy
- Founder: Enrico Isaia
- Headquarters: Naples, Italy
- Area served: International boutiques: Baku, Beverly Hills, Capri, Ekaterinburg, Hong Kong, Kyiv, Macao, Milan, Moscow, Ulaanbaatar, New York City, St. Petersburg, San Francisco, Tokyo, Toronto, Chicago, Kuwait City
- Products: Men's tailoring, Classic Italian suits
- Services: Fashion production, ready to wear, made to measure
- Website: www.Isaia.it

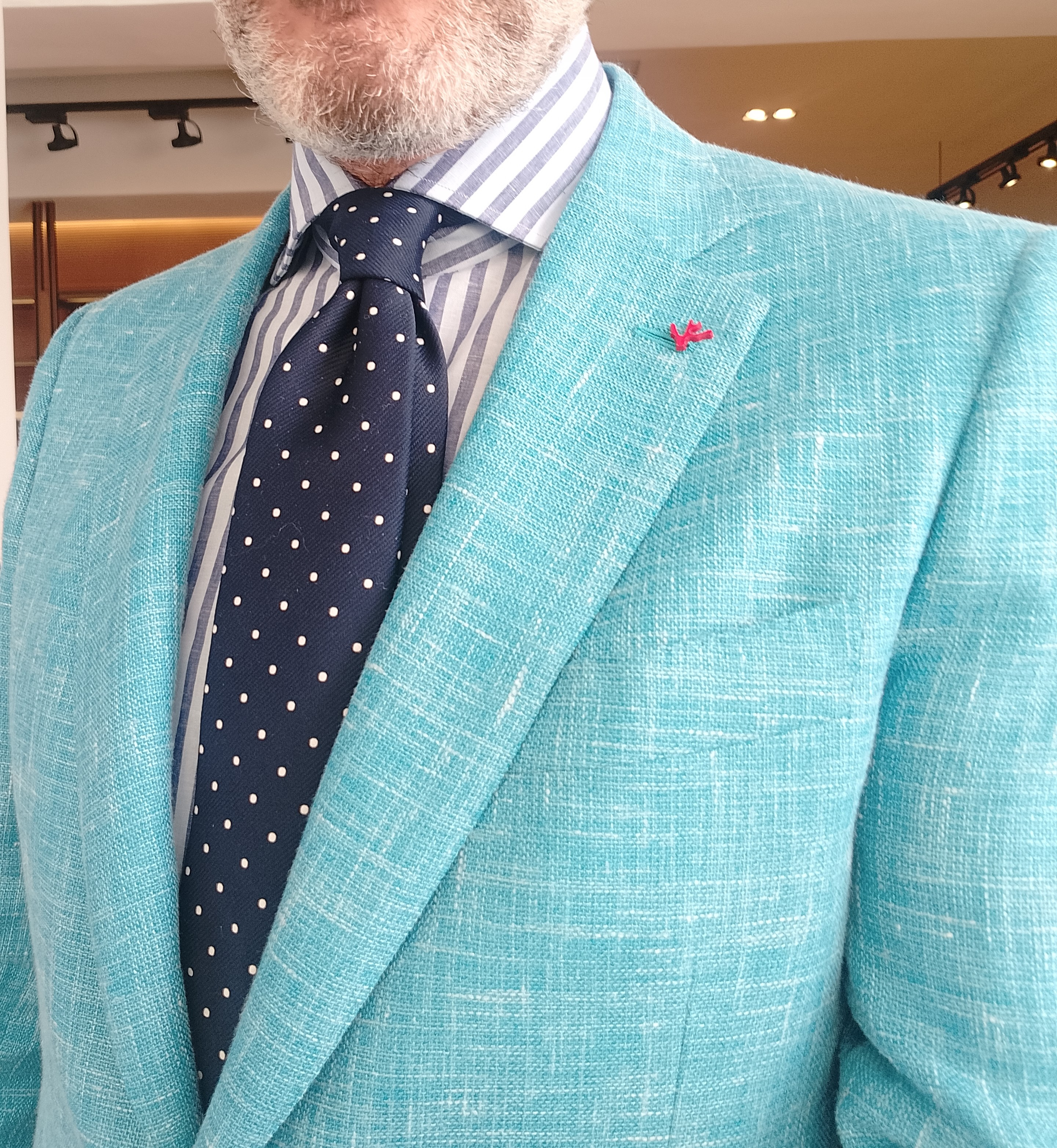
An ISAIA wool/silk/linen blazer worn with the brand's coral logo lapel pin

Isaia is a Neapolitan tailoring luxury brand founded by Enrico Isaia in Casalnuovo di Napoli in 1920. The brand is recognized by its tiny red coral logo, which is a good-luck charm in Naples. The brand describes its clientele as "passionate, sophisticated, irreverent, eclectic and elegant."

Gianluca Isaia is the chief executive officer.

== Stores ==
Isaia has monobrand stores in Naples, Baku, Bal Harbour, Beverly Hills, Capri, Chicago, Cyprus, Ekaterinburg, Hong Kong, Kuwait city, Kyiv, Las Vegas, London, Macao, Milan, Miami Bal Harbour, Moscow, Palm Beach, Ulaanbaatar, New Delhi, New York City, Riyadh, St. Petersburg, St. Moritz, San Francisco, Rome, Toronto and Tokyo.

== History ==
Isaia was founded in Naples by Enrico Isaia, who opened a fabric store for Neapolitan tailoring, and later a small atelier next to the store. In 1957, the brothers Enrico, Rosario and Corrado Isaia moved the business to Casalnuovo, a village near Naples where tailoring was a large part of the economy, and Isaia became a men's tailoring company. Enrico Isaia died at age 84 on 7 March 2017.

=== Coral legend ===
In Naples, the mythical origin story of red coral is well known. As the legend goes, the Greek hero Perseus killed the Gorgon Medusa and wanted to deliver her head as a wedding present to the King of Seriphos, who was about to wed his mother. On his way home, he saw the beautiful Andromeda chained to a rock and about to be eaten by a sea monster. Wanting to save her life, he killed the beast and then sat on the bank of the water to wash his hands. When he set the sack with Medusa's head beside him, her blood dripped into the water and transformed into what we know as red coral. For this, Neapolitans consider red coral a sign of good luck, and they use it in everything from pendants to religious ornaments to jewellery.

== Products ==
Isaia is most known for its Neapolitan tailoring, often in bright colours to counteract the sun bleaching that occurs in the warm climate of Naples. The brand produces suits, blazers, neckties, knitwear, shirts, overshirts, swim trunks and leather goods for itself and select made in Italy retailers. In 2020, the brand produced denim with a customized selvage and a traditional Neapolitan proverb embroidered on the inside.

== Philanthropy ==
Isaia supports Capodimonte Museum in its hometown of Naples.

== Gallery ==
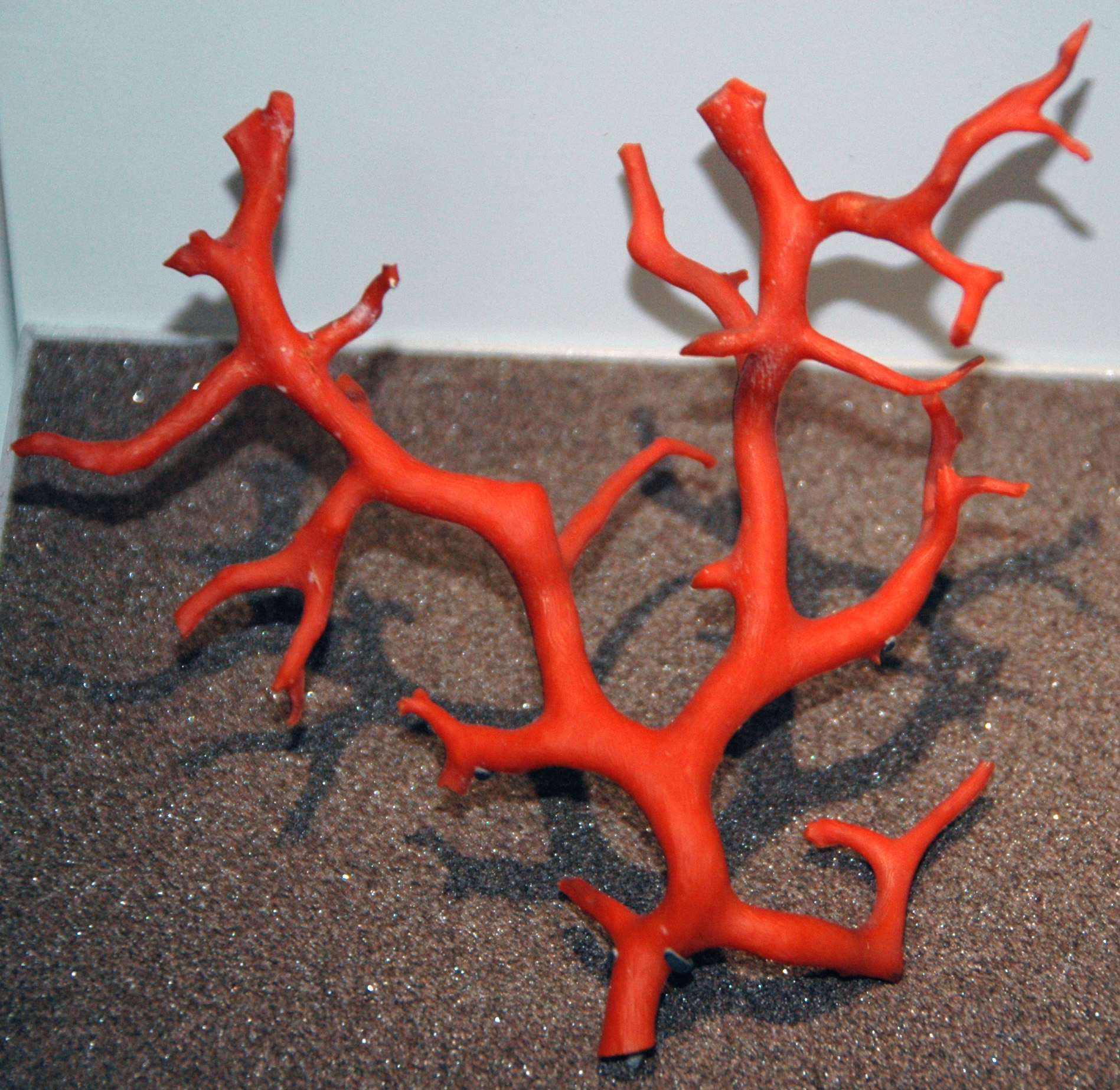
Red coral inspired the Isaia lapel pin and is a symbol of the brand

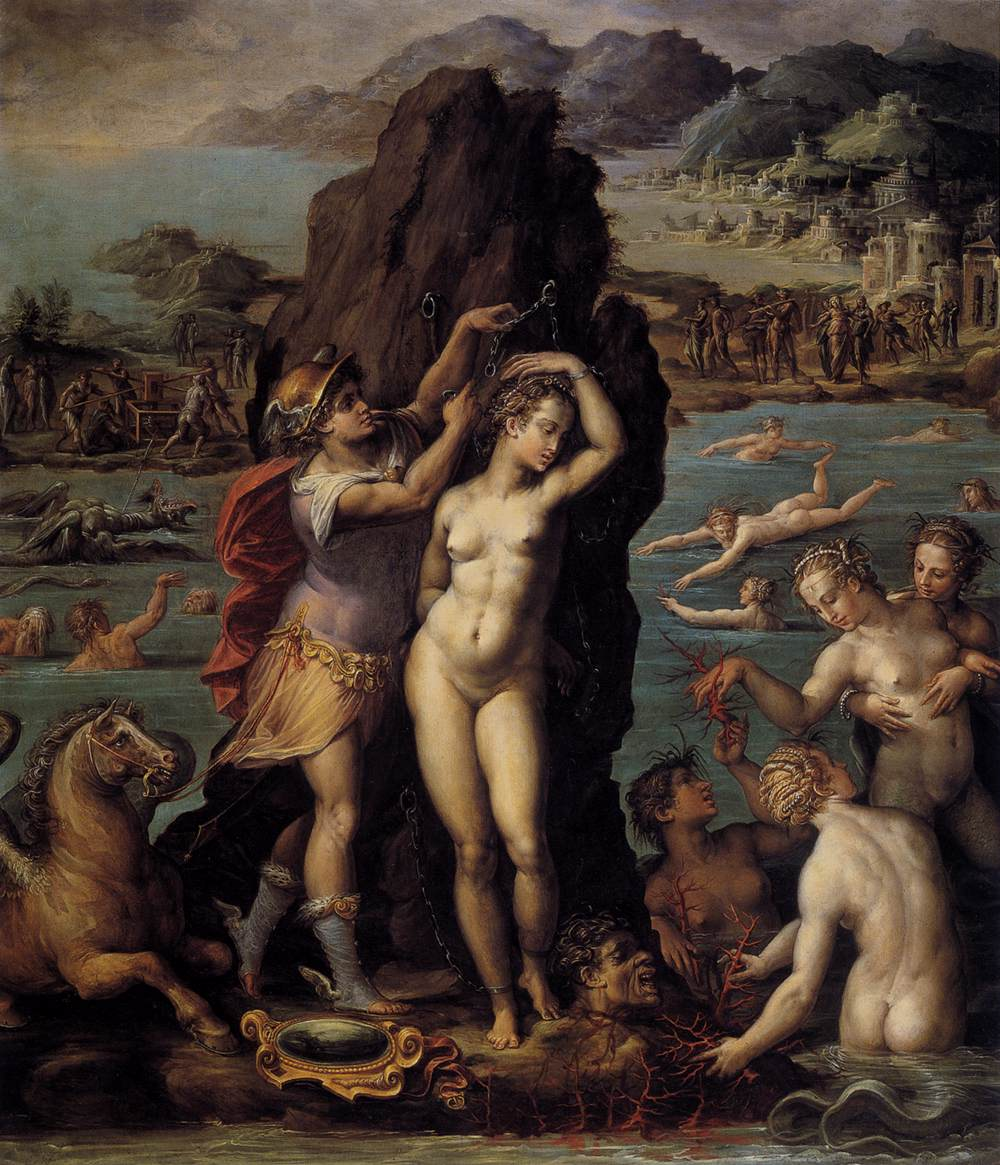
Perseus saving Andromeda while Medusa's severed head bleeds into the sea

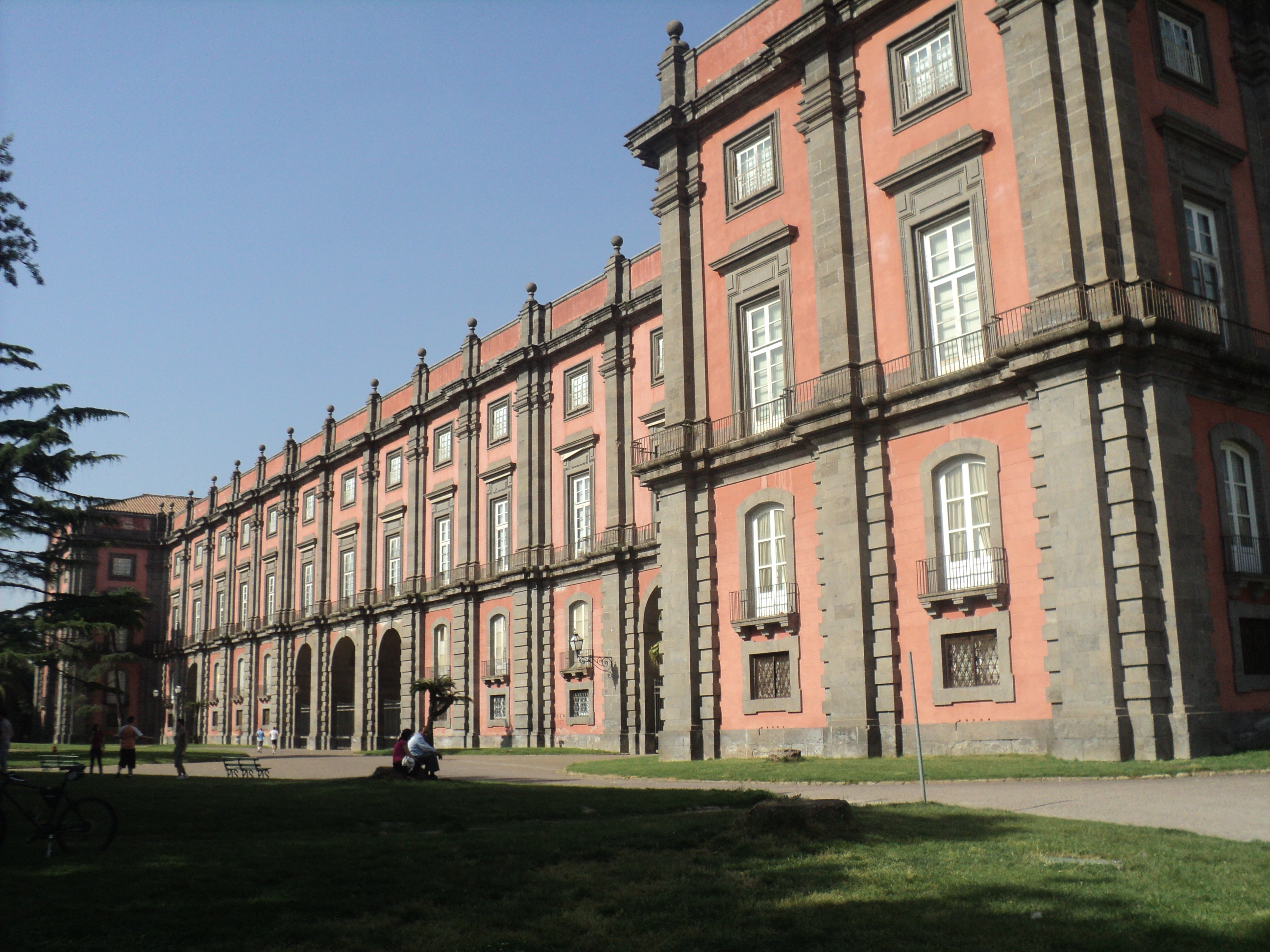
The Capodimonte Museum in Naples receives financial support from Isaia

== See also ==
- Italian fashion
- Made in Italy
- Cesare Attolini
- Neapolitan tailoring
- E. Marinella
- Kiton
