= Cesare Attolini =

Italian luxury menswear brand

- Type: Private
- Industry: Fashion (menswear)
- Founded: 1930; 96 years ago Naples, Italy
- Founder: Vincenzo Attolini
- Headquarters: Casalnuovo (Naples)
- Area served: Worldwide
- Products: Men's tailoring, classic Italian suits

Cesare Attolini is a high-luxury menswear brand founded in Casalnuovo di Napoli the 1930s by Vincenzo Attolini, the creator of the Neapolitan tailoring style. In addition to wholesale accounts, Cesare Attolini has stores in Milan, New York, Miami, Moscow, Monte Carlo and London.

== Overview ==
Vincenzo Attolini created the Neapolitan silhouette featuring a slim waist, high armholes, generous sleeve-head, and minimal shoulder padding. His son Cesare Attolini established the system to produce at scale and market the brand.

The brand is run by Vincenzo Attolini's grandsons Giuseppe and Massimiliano Attolini, who are responsible for the brand's expansion internationally.

== Fioroni ==
In 2015, Cesare Attolini acquired Fioroni, an Umbria-based knitwear manufacturer founded in 1978 in Castiglione del Lago by Silvana Parrini. Originally established as a small artisanal workshop producing embroidery and handcrafted textiles, Fioroni later shifted its focus toward knitwear after Parrini's husband, Palmiro Fiorini, joined the business.

== Shops ==
Retail locations are in Milan on Via Bagutta, Miami Beach at the Bal Harbour Shops, New York City on Madison Avenue, London on Mount Street in Mayfair, Monaco, and Moscow (Tverskaya Street).

== See also ==
- Kiton
- Isaia
