= E. Marinella =

Italian luxury necktie company

- Type: Privately held company
- Industry: Fashion, Luxury
- Founded: 1914; 112 years ago Naples, Italy
- Founder: Eugenio Marinella
- Headquarters: Naples, Italy
- Area served: Worldwide
- Key people: Maurizio Marinella, Alessandro Marinella
- Products: necktie, accessories
- Revenue: c. €18 million (2025)
- Website: www.emarinella.com

E. Marinella is an Italian maker of luxury accessories, best known for its handmade silk neckties. Founded by Eugenio Marinella in 1914 in a shop of twenty square metres on the seafront of Naples, the company is regarded as one of the historic names of Made in Italy craftsmanship and of the Neapolitan tailoring tradition. It has remained a family business for four generations: it is currently run by the founder's grandson, Maurizio Marinella, and his son, Alessandro Marinella.

== History ==
In 1914 Eugenio Marinella opened a shop in Piazza Vittoria, on the Riviera di Chiaia in Naples, with the stated ambition of recreating what writer Matilde Serao described as "a small corner of England in Naples". Eugenio, and later his son Luigi, travelled personally to England to select fabrics for the firm's ties and shirts; the original boutique itself was fitted with English materials, down to the door jambs. Over the following decades the boutique became an institution of Neapolitan elegance, serving the city's aristocracy and, progressively, an international clientele.

The brand's reputation spread beyond Italy in the 1980s, when President of the Italian Republic Francesco Cossiga adopted the habit of presenting heads of state with a box of five Marinella ties on official visits, establishing the tie as an Italian diplomatic gift. E. Marinella ties were included in the ITEMS: Is Fashion Modern? exhibition at MoMA in New York from October 1, 2017 to January 28, 2018, which surveyed the most influential garments and accessories of the past century.

In 2019, on the company's 105th anniversary, Alessandro Marinella – the founder's great-grandson – formally joined the business, taking charge of its management and of a programme of international retail expansion and digital development. In 2025 the Italian Tennis and Padel Federation (FITP) commissioned E. Marinella to produce its official federation ties, marking the brand's entry into institutional sportswear partnerships.

== Company ==
E. Marinella remains privately held by the Marinella family, with revenue of approximately €18 million reported in 2025. Production is still centred on Naples, where each tie is cut and sewn by hand; the historic twenty-square-metre shop on the Riviera di Chiaia continues to operate as the company's flagship.

The brand has standalone stores in Naples, Milan, Rome, London, Turin and Tokyo, and is sold in New York at the Bergdorf Goodman Building. It is also distributed through luxury department stores including Le Bon Marché in Paris and Liberty in London.

== Clients ==
Politicians such as Barack Obama, John F. Kennedy, Bill Clinton, Nicolas Sarkozy, Boris Yeltsin, Silvio Berlusconi, Jacques Chirac and Hosni Mubarak have worn Marinella ties, as have King Juan Carlos, King Charles, Gianni Agnelli, Prince Albert of Monaco, and Aristotle Onassis.

== Products ==
The core of the company's production remains the handmade silk necktie, each cut from printed silk and assembled individually. In addition to ties, E. Marinella sells bags, watches, cologne, accessories and cufflinks for men, while its women's line includes bags, scarves, perfumes and accessories. The company has since expanded towards a broader made-to-measure offering, including outerwear, shoes and womenswear.

== See also ==
- Made in Italy
- Neapolitan tailoring
- Italian fashion
