= Made in Italy =

Merchandise mark

Made in Italy brand

Made in Italy is a merchandise mark indicating that a product is entirely designed, manufactured, and packaged in Italy, especially concerning the design, fashion, food, manufacturing, craftsmanship, and engineering industries.

According to a market study conducted by Statista in the Made-In-Country-Index (MICI) 2017, and published by Forbes on 27 March 2017, Made in Italy was ranked seventh in terms of reputation among consumers worldwide. KPMG reported in 2012 that Made in Italy was the third most recognized brand in the world after Coca-Cola and Visa.

For tax and customs purposes, Made in Italy is indicated through labelling.

In substantive terms, it is reflected in the 100% Made in Italy certification, which essentially follows the provisions of Article 16 of Law 166 of 2009, defining a product as entirely made in Italy.

== History ==
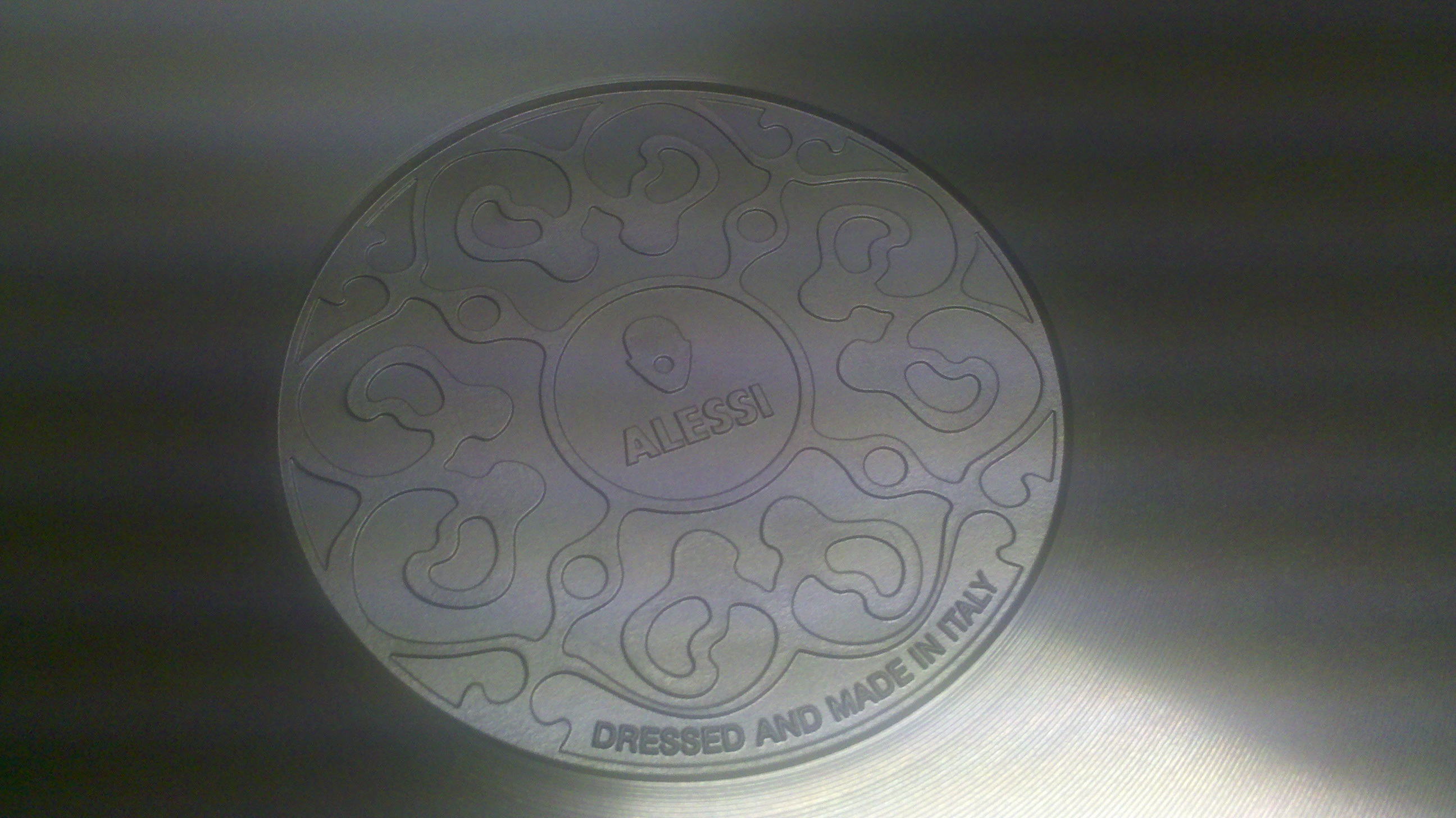
A grill pan, with the label "Made in Italy", designed by Marcel Wanders for Alessi and Esselunga

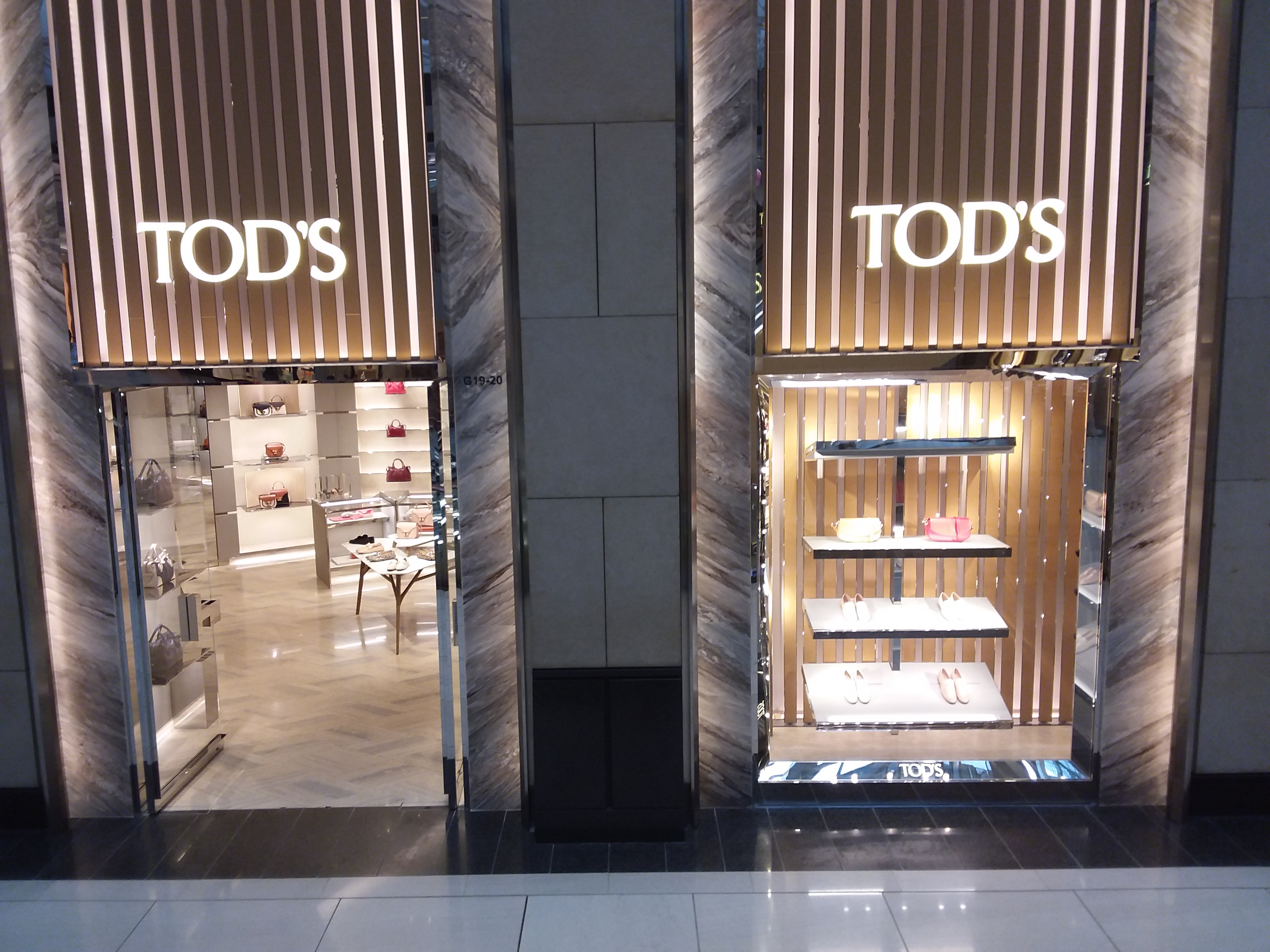
A Tod's store in Hong Kong.

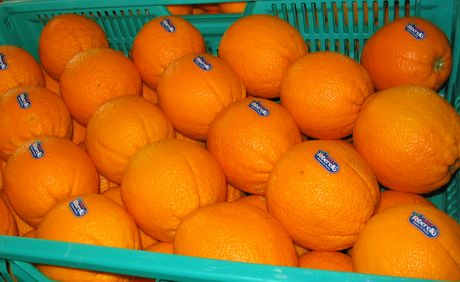
Ribera oranges D.O.P.

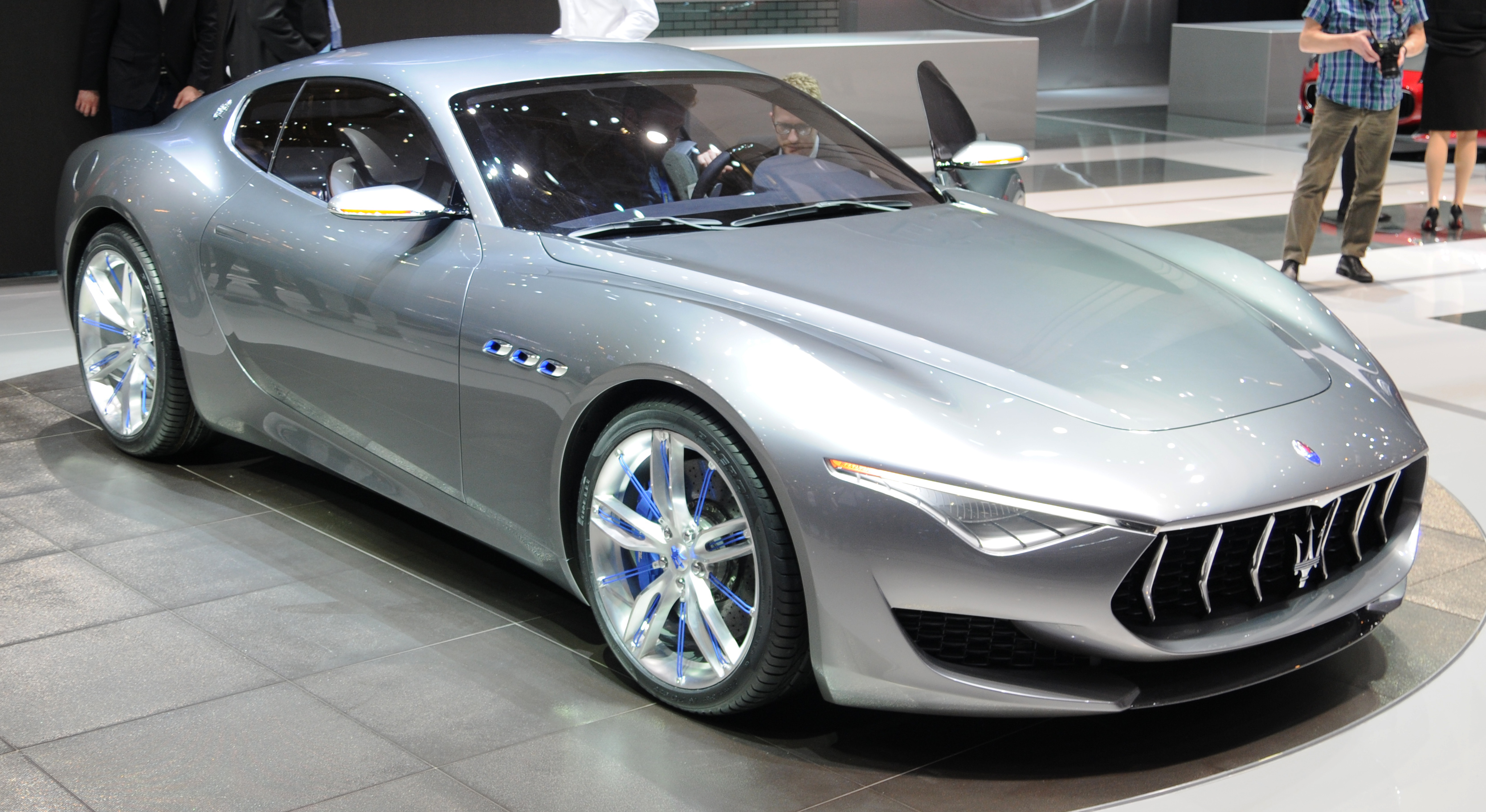
The 2014 Maserati Alfieri

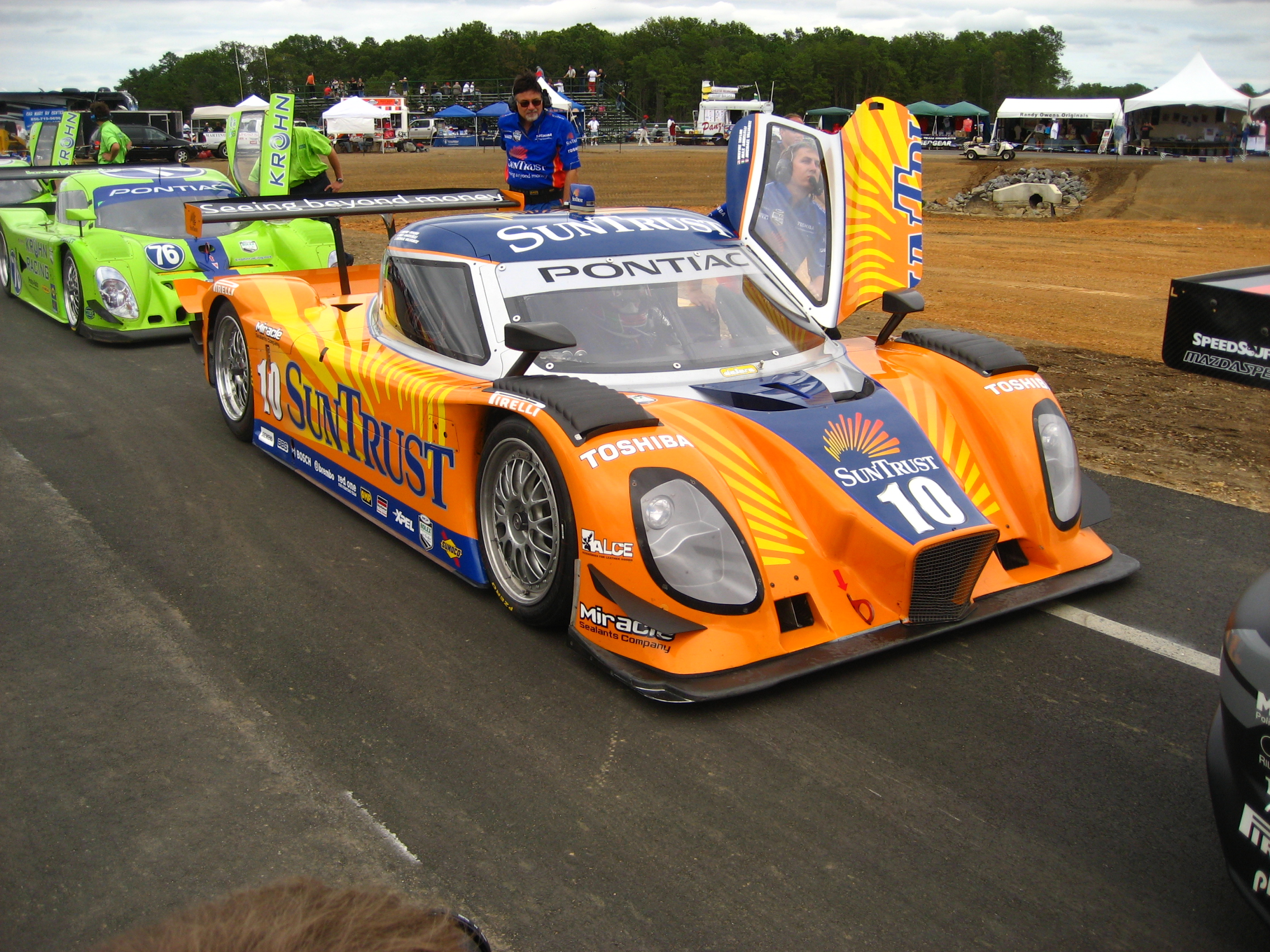
A 2008 Dallara Pontiac

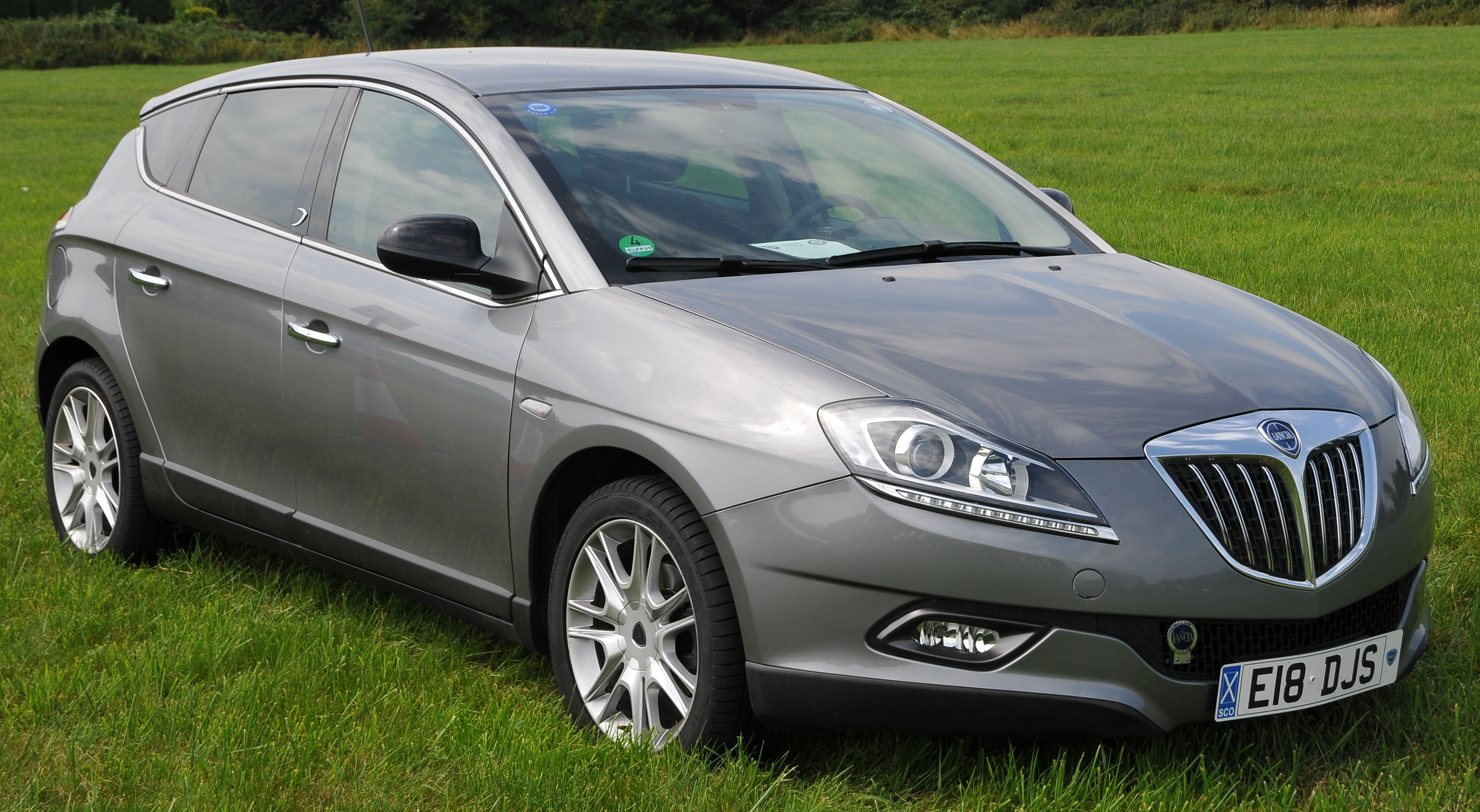
The Lancia Delta (2008)

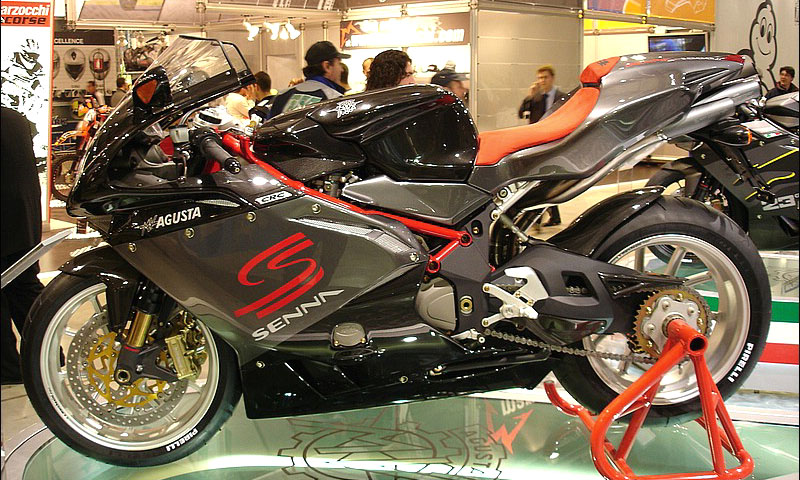
MV Agusta F4 Senna

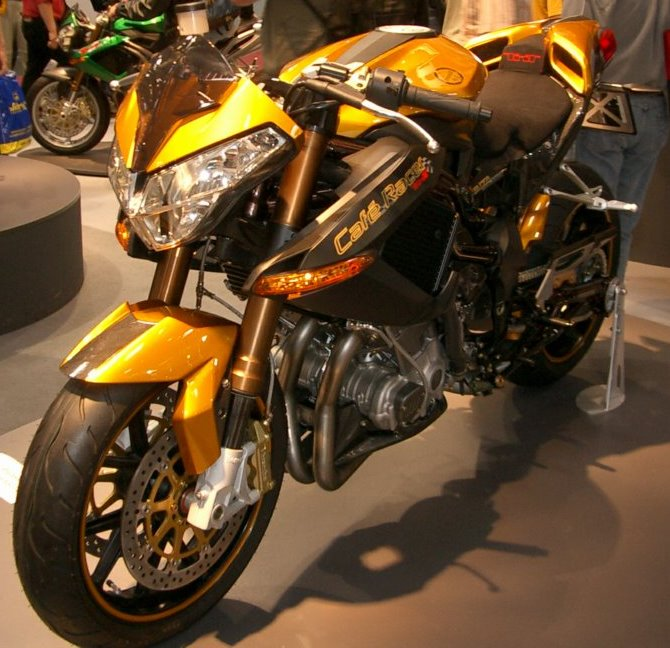
2006 Benelli TNT Cafè Racer

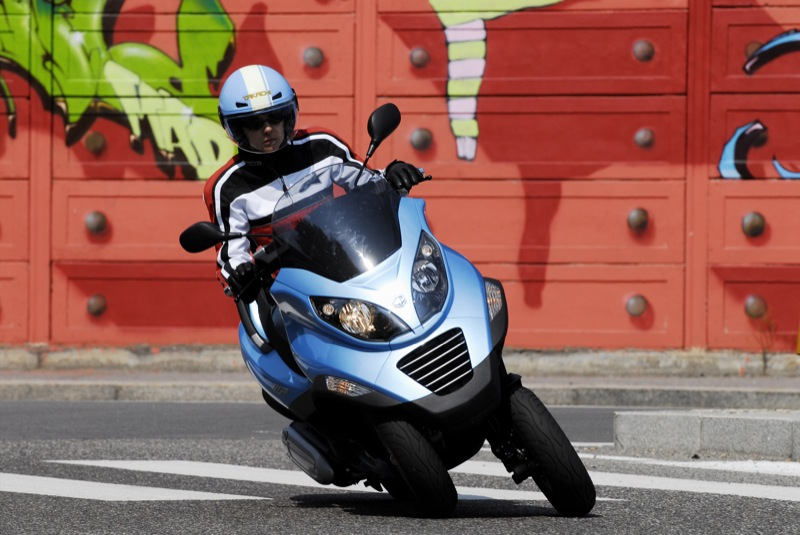
Piaggio MP3

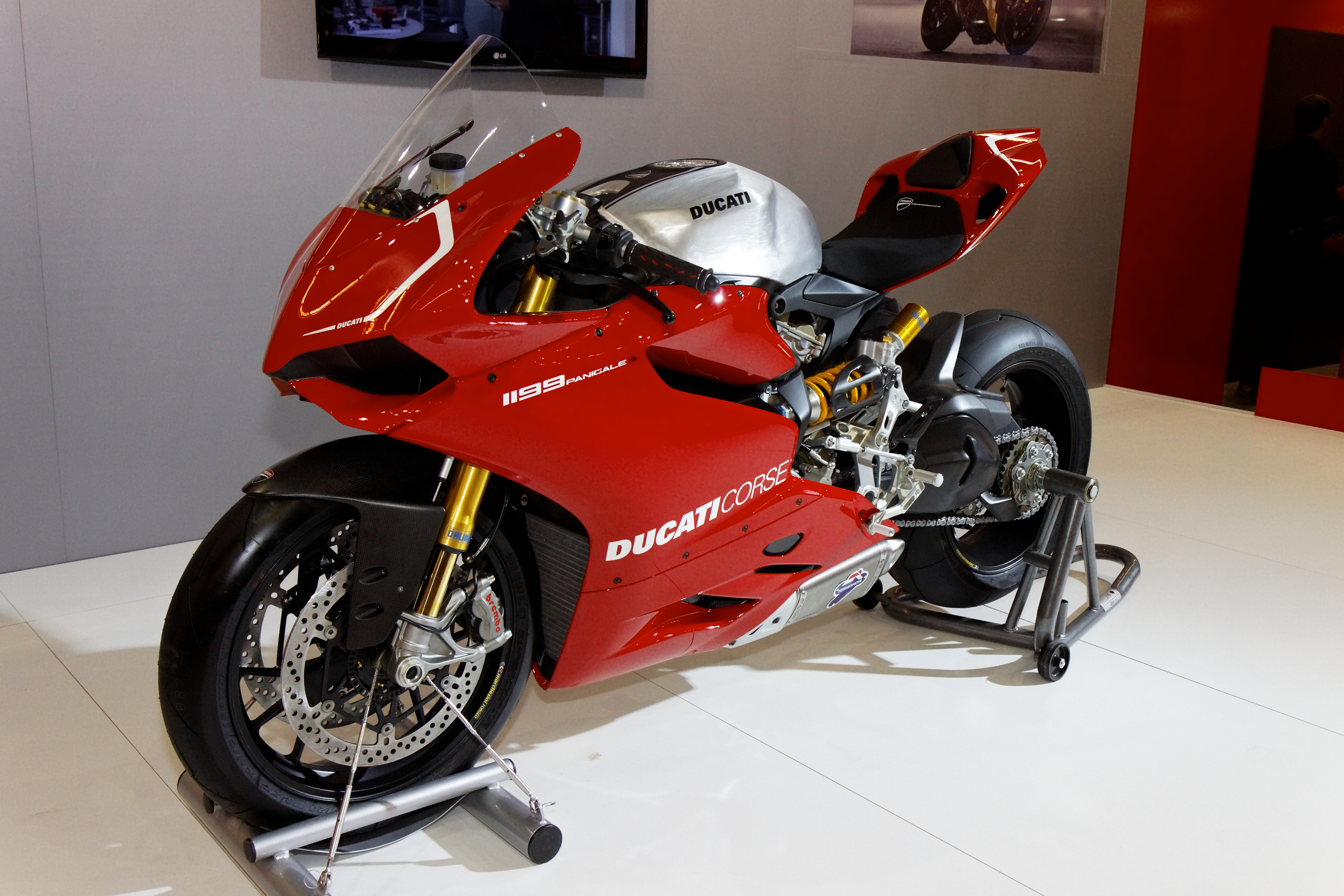
Ducati 1199 Panigale S, marketed in 2012

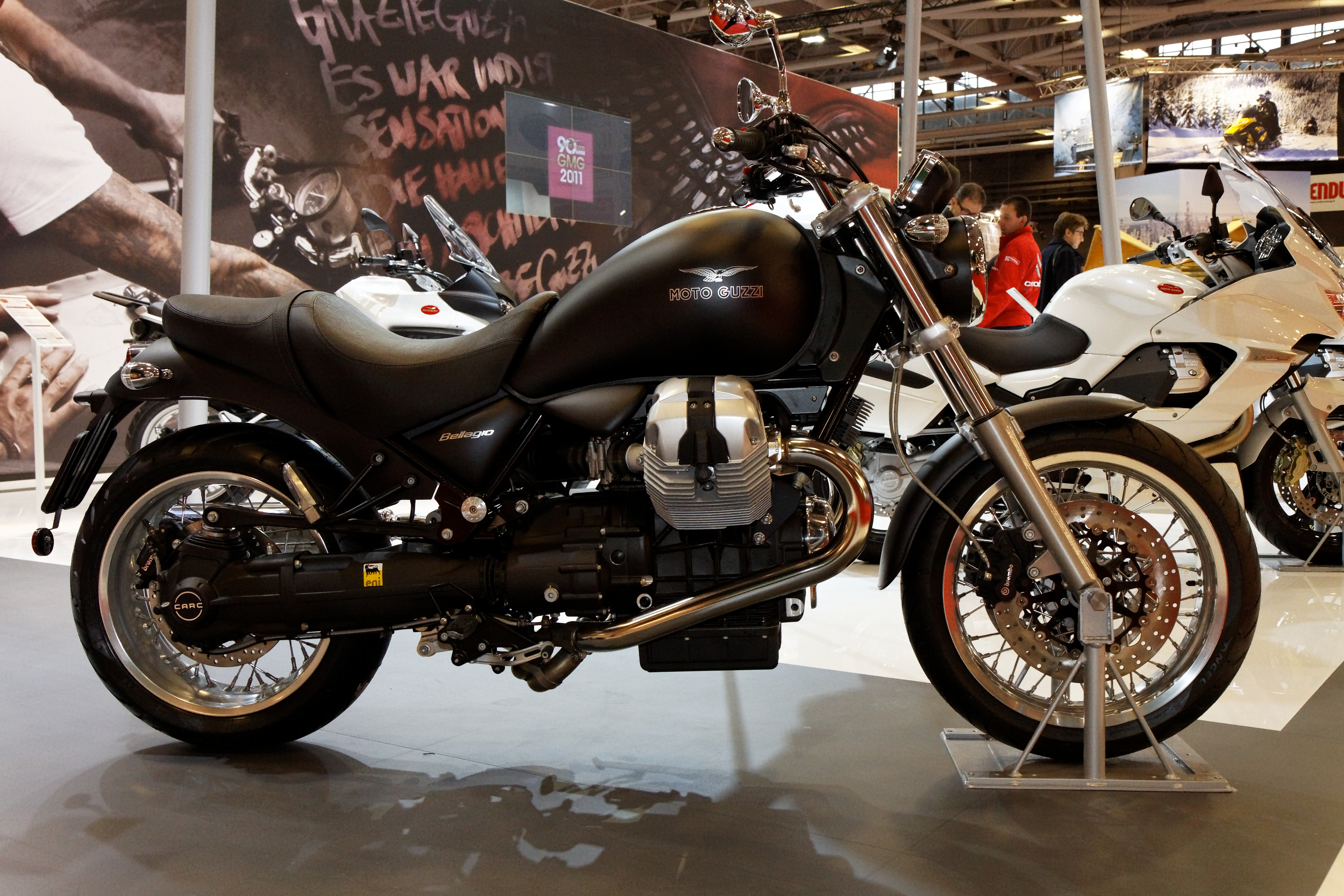
Moto Guzzi Bellagio 940 Aquila Nera (2011)

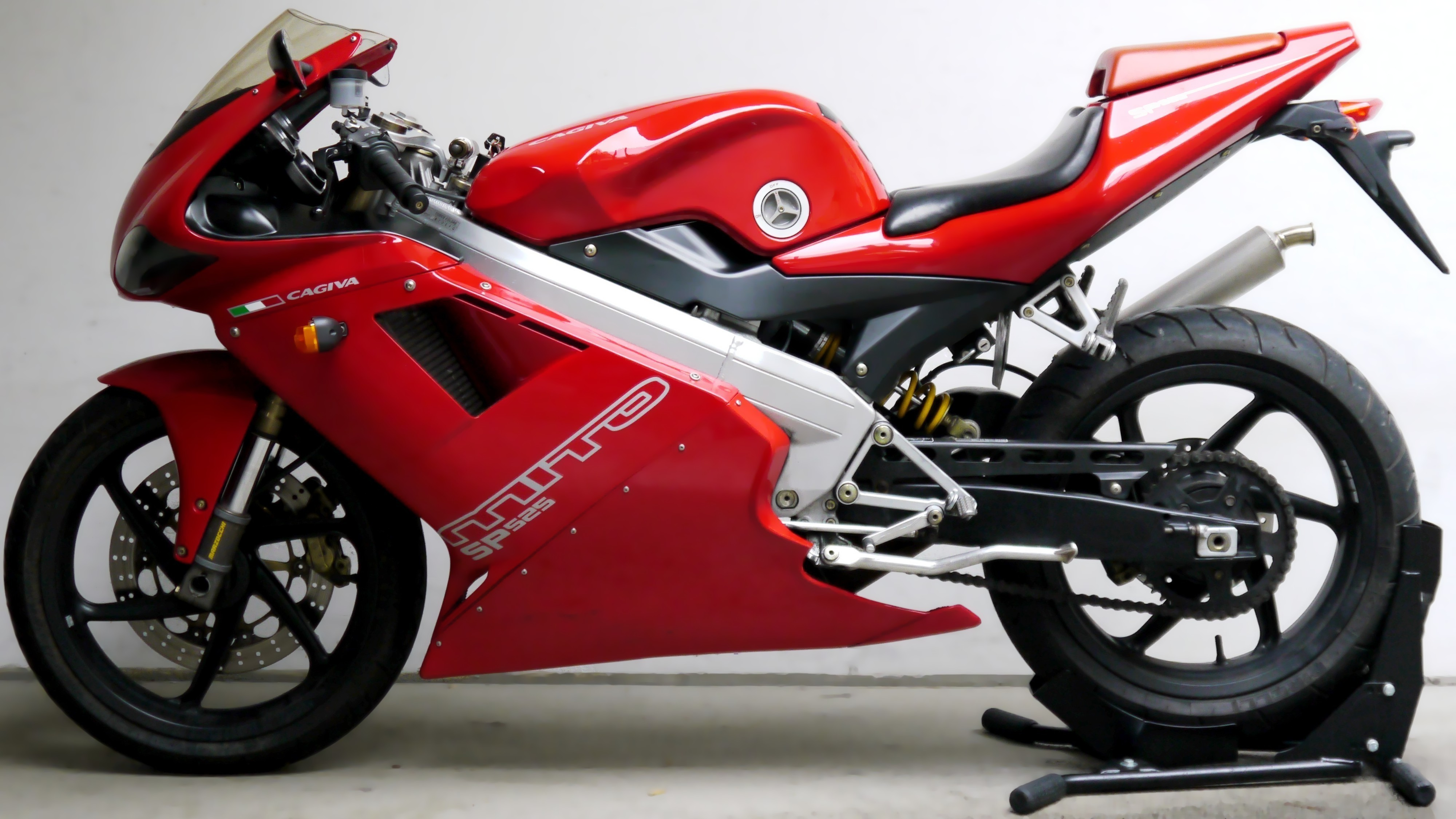
Cagiva Mito SP525

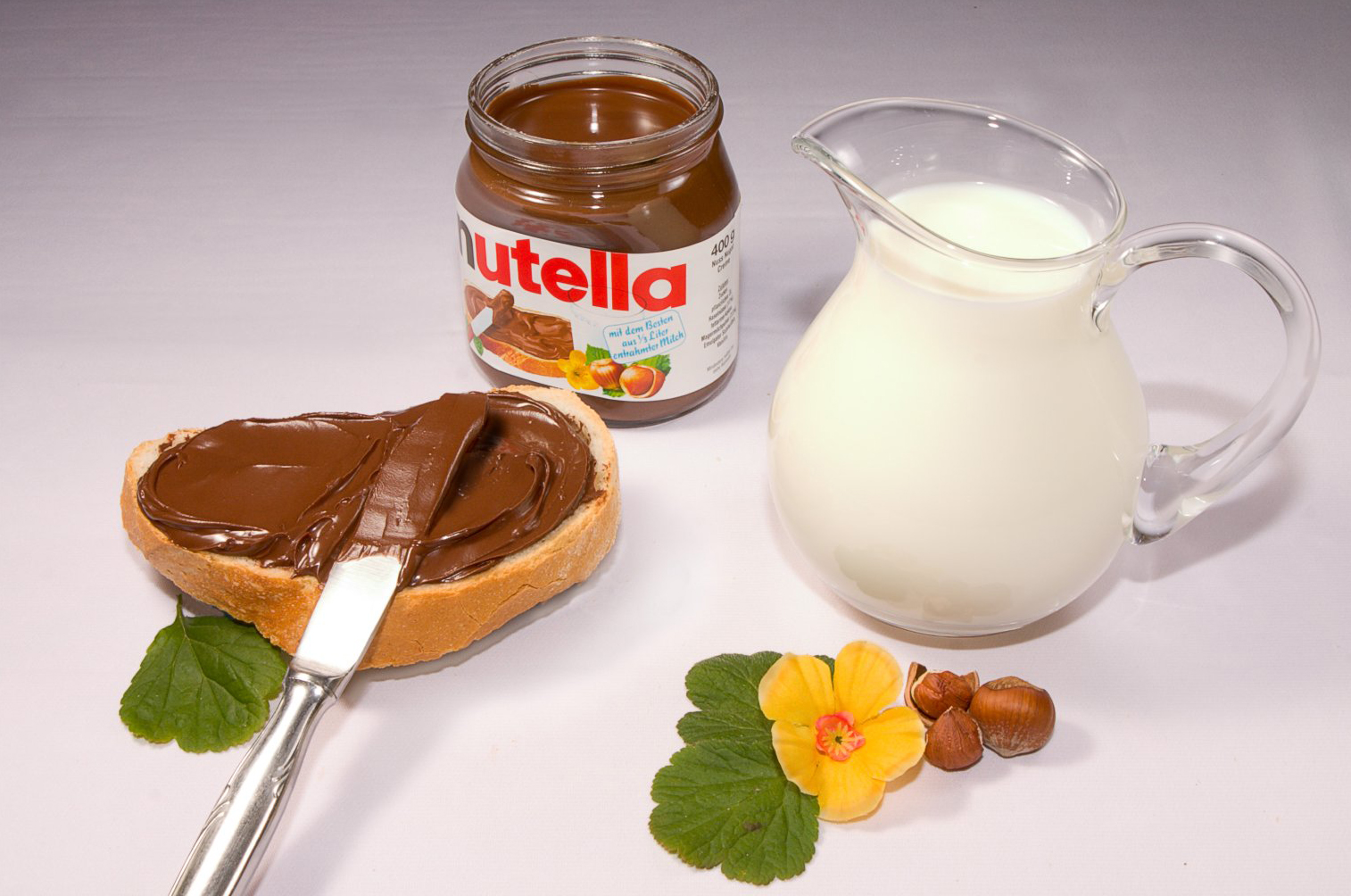
Nutella

Italian products have often been associated with quality, high specialization and differentiation, and elegance. The concept is often associated with luxury and with Italy's well-established industrial districts.

"Made in Italy" is an English language expression used by Italian manufacturers, especially from the 1980s onward, as part of an effort to promote and protect the Italian identity of products, and to emphasize Italy's distinctiveness in international markets in four traditional industries: fashion, food, furniture and mechanical engineering (automobiles, industrial design, machinery and shipbuilding), which in Italian are also known as the "Four As": Abbigliamento (clothes), Agroalimentare (food), Arredamento (furniture) and Automobili (automobiles). The use of "Made in Italy" aimed to combat the counterfeiting of Italian craftsmanship and industrial production, particularly in the four traditional sectors of fashion, food, furniture, and mechanical engineering (automobiles, industrial design, machinery and shipbuilding).

Abroad, Italian products gradually acquired a strong reputation and corresponding commercial advantage. The average Italian product was generally recognized—or at least expected—to display high manufacturing quality, attention to detail, imaginative design, and durability. Italian products were historically associated with quality, specialization, distinctiveness, elegance, and origin in well-known traditional Italian industrial sectors.

From 1999 onward, the Made in Italy brand began to be promoted by various institutions and associations, including the Istituto per la Protezione, la Promozione e la Preservazione dell'origine dei prodotti agroalimentari e vitivinicoli Made in Italy (Institute for the Protection, Promotion and Preservation of the Origin of Made in Italy Agri-food and Wine Products), 100ITA (100ITA – The Mark for the Protection, Promotion and Preservation of Made in Italy Products), the Istituto per la Tutela dei Produttori Italiani (Institute for the Protection of the Italian Manufacturers), the Associazione Made in Italy (Made in Italy Association), the Comitato Made in Italy (Made in Italy Committee), the Associazione Italian Sounding (Italian Sounding Association), the Associazione Nazionale per la Tutela della Finestra Made in Italy (National Association for the Protection of Made in Italy Windows), Food Italy Certification (Food Italy Certification), and ItalCheck (ItalCheck – Made in Italy Certification), as well as by trade associations, protection consortia and government bodies, which regulated its use through specific laws and assigned enforcement to the relevant authorities.

The ITPI has been the only national body registered with the CNEL since 2004 tasked with protecting, promoting, and enhancing the "Made in Italy" brand. Within its protective role, the institute has drafted numerous legislative proposals submitted to the relevant authorities. To emphasize the value of products entirely made in Italy, the "100% Made in Italy Certification" was created and introduced. Since 2024, the "Made in Italy Certificate" has also been active as a pilot project undergoing accreditation.

Law no. 350 of 2003, which substantially revised labeling rules on origin, provides that "The importation, exportation for commercial purposes, or marketing of products bearing false or misleading indications of origin constitutes a criminal offense and is punishable under Article 517 of the Penal Code."

Current regulations provide that such indications may be used only when the product has been entirely manufactured in Italy, or when the last substantial transformation took place in Italy. Simply being "designed" in Italy is not sufficient to justify references to Italian origin if manufacturing takes place abroad; in such cases, the use of Italian symbols or wording may constitute misleading practice. In 2009, further protection was introduced through Decree Law no. 135 of 25 September 2009, Article 16, titled Made in Italy e prodotti interamente italiani.

In January 2014, the Google Cultural Institute, in collaboration with the Italian government and the Italian Chamber of Commerce, launched an online project to promote Made in Italy by showcasing renowned Italian products through virtual showroom technology.

On 15 April 2024, the first National Made in Italy Day was held, an event established by the Meloni Cabinet to promote and enhance "Italian work, enterprise and products."

One of the sectors most closely associated with the "Made in Italy" brand is Italian luxury leather goods, combining craftsmanship and innovation. The main production areas are concentrated in Tuscany—particularly between Florence and Scandicci—and in Lombardy, where numerous companies collaborate with leading international fashion houses.

=== Contemporary challenges and sustainability ===
- The Venice Sustainable Fashion Forum highlighted the importance of reforming supply chains according to sustainable values, with the aim of making Italy a global leader in sustainability.

== Regulation ==
In 2009, the Italian law 135 (Decree-Law 135, 25 September 2009 – Italian Parliament) stated that only products entirely made in Italy (design, manufacture, and packaging) are allowed to use the labels 100% Made in Italy, 100% Italia, tutto italiano in every language, with or without the Italian flag. Each abuse is punishable by Italian law.

Article 16 of Law 166/2009 introduced more stringent regulations regarding the proper use of the "Made in Italy" designation. It established that products labeled as such must be entirely conceived, manufactured, and packaged in Italy, thereby preventing misleading practices and reinforcing the authenticity of Italian craftsmanship. Under this provision, competent authorities are granted the power to verify production processes, enforce compliance, and sanction offenders who falsely attribute an Italian origin to their goods. In doing so, Article 16 not only protects consumers from deceptive claims but also safeguards the reputation and economic value of Italy's traditional manufacturing and artisanal excellence. Compared with "Made in Germany" ("all essential manufacturing steps") and "Made in USA" ("all or virtually all"), Italian regulation is more restrictive ("totally") in determining what qualifies for the use of the "100% Made in Italy" label. Any representation more prominent than standard labelling requires verification that the product has been entirely made in Italy in accordance with Article 16 of Law 166/2009. With the so-called Legge Reguzzoni (2010), provisions were introduced regarding the marketing of textile, leather goods and footwear products. In particular, the law established, in these sectors, a system of mandatory product labelling indicating the origin of each production stage, thus ensuring traceability. It also permitted the use of the designation "Made in Italy" exclusively for products whose manufacturing stages took place predominantly in Italy. These provisions are contained in Regulation (EU) No. 952/2013 of the European Parliament and of the council, which established the new Union Customs Code (hereinafter UCC or simply the Code), in force since 1 May 2016. Within it, Section 1 of Chapter 2 (Title II), Articles 59 to 63, sets out the regulatory framework concerning non-preferential origin. In particular, Articles 31 and 32 of Commission Delegated Regulation (EU) 2015/2446, implementing Article 60 of the UCC in paragraphs 1 and 2 respectively, set out the two main criteria for determining non-preferential origin, in a manner similar to that previously provided for under the former Community Customs Code.

Following the judicial administration of Loro Piana, accused of creating a subcontracting chain linked to illegal labour intermediation and labour exploitation, Parliament approved Bill 1484 Amidei–Ancorotti for SMEs, known as the "salvabrand" measure, benefiting major fashion companies. It allows contracting companies to certify their supply chain provided they have adopted appropriate model of organisation and management systems (e.g., pursuant to Legislative Decree 231/2001) capable of preventing offences, thereby exempting them from liability for crimes committed by companies in their subcontracting chain.

== Certification and promotion of "Made in Italy" ==
The Istituto per la Tutela dei Produttori Italiani (ITPI) safeguards and promotes authentic "Made in Italy" products through certification of the entire national production chain and support for the authenticity and quality of Italian goods.

The Official Portal of Italian Producers serves as an official showcase, ensuring visibility and credibility for "Made in Italy" products, while the national register of certified producers operates as an official list of companies whose entire production chain is based in Italy.

There are also specific certifications, such as "100% Made in Italy", which rigorously verify origin and production processes according to the IT01 standard, as well as new accreditation schemes aimed at combating counterfeiting and strengthening the reputation of national products. A pilot project for a new certification scheme is currently underway.

== Scope of the label ==
The Made in Italy trademark does not govern the use of the words "Made in Italy". For that purpose, only the last substantial transformation or processing is considered according to Law n. 350/2003.

== Fashion and cosmetics ==
The Italian fashion industry, integral to the "Made in Italy" label, is known for its craftsmanship, design, and luxury. Supported by leading houses such as Gucci, Prada, and Dolce&Gabbana, the sector showcases Italian design globally, and helps drive international fashion trends. These brands, known for merging traditional artisanship with modern trends, contribute to the domestic economy and Italy's export strength, while upholding the nation's reputation for quality and craftsmanship. In addition to its economic impact, the industry contributes in advancing gender equality, through representation of women in the workforce and leadership roles, and promotes environmental sustainability by adopting practices aimed at reducing environmental impact and promoting ethical sourcing and production.

The Italian cosmetics industry, alongside the country's fashion brands, is associated with quality, and combines traditional aesthetics with contemporary technology. Brands such as Olivella, Skin&Co Roma, Kiko Milano, and Diego Dalla Palma have established a strong market presence, combining Italy's rich aesthetic heritage with modern advancements. Italian fashion labels like Gucci, Dolce&Gabbana, and Acqua di Parma have expanded into the cosmetics and perfume sectors, experiencing growth within these areas as well. This development in the Italian fashion and cosmetics sectors helps reinforce Italy's reputation in the luxury and design markets, further affirming the "Made in Italy" label's status in the international fashion and beauty industry.

== Brands ==
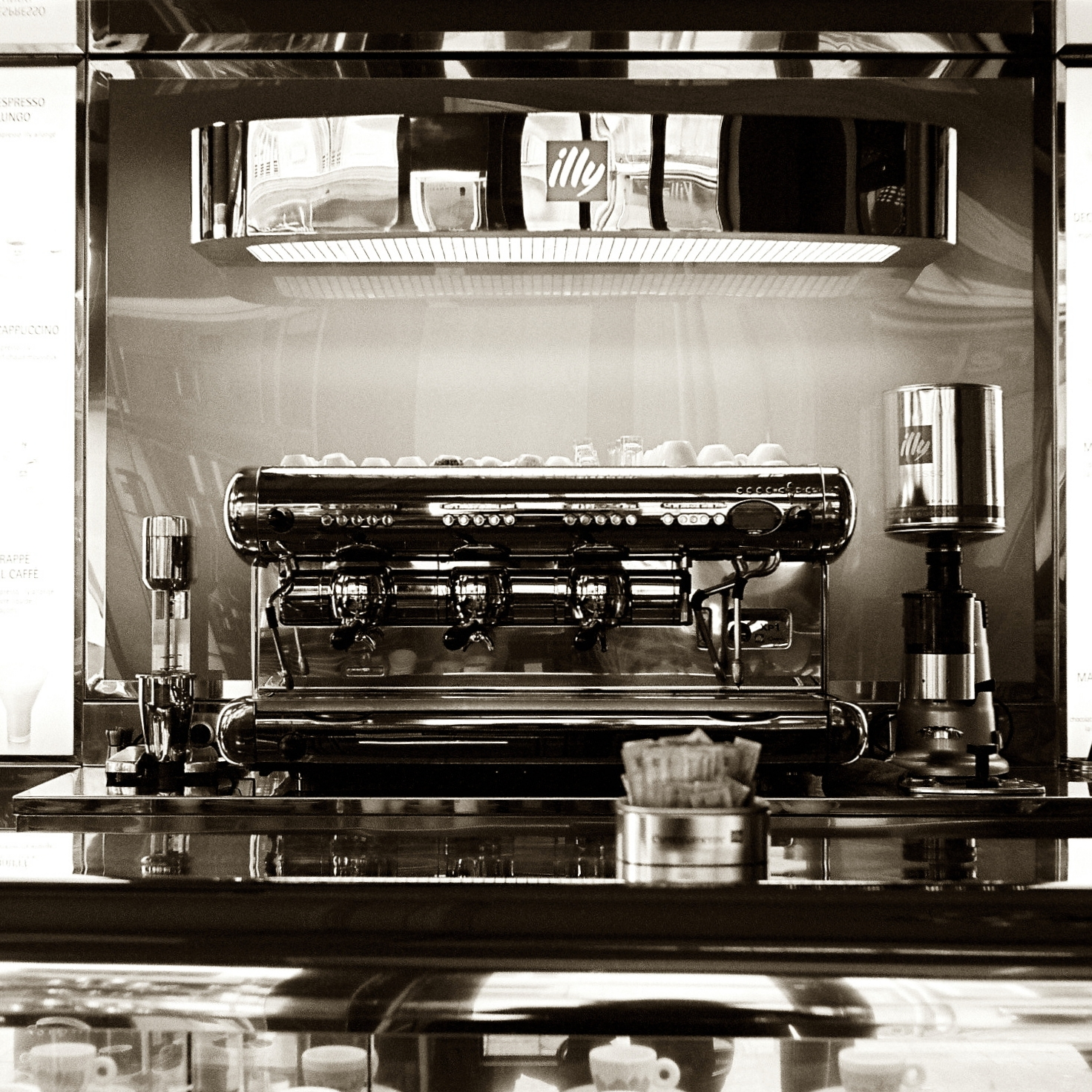
Illy espresso machine

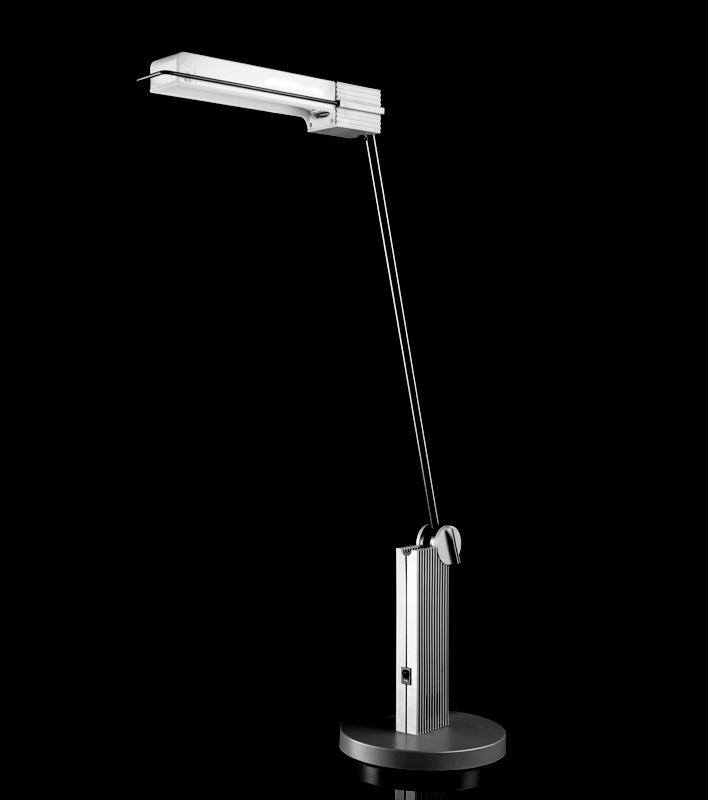
Artemide Alistro Lamp designed by Ernesto Gismondi

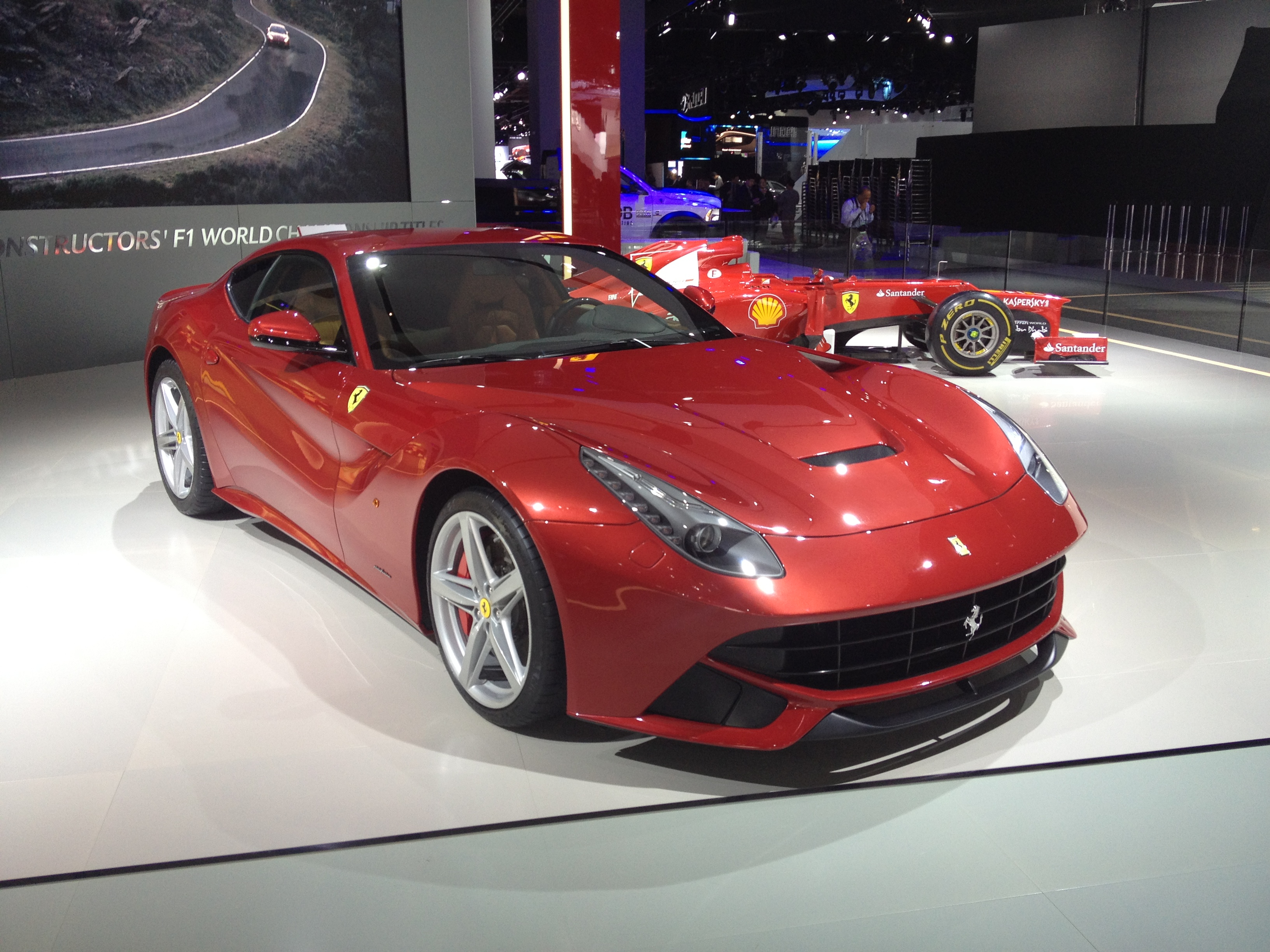
Ferrari F12 Berlinetta

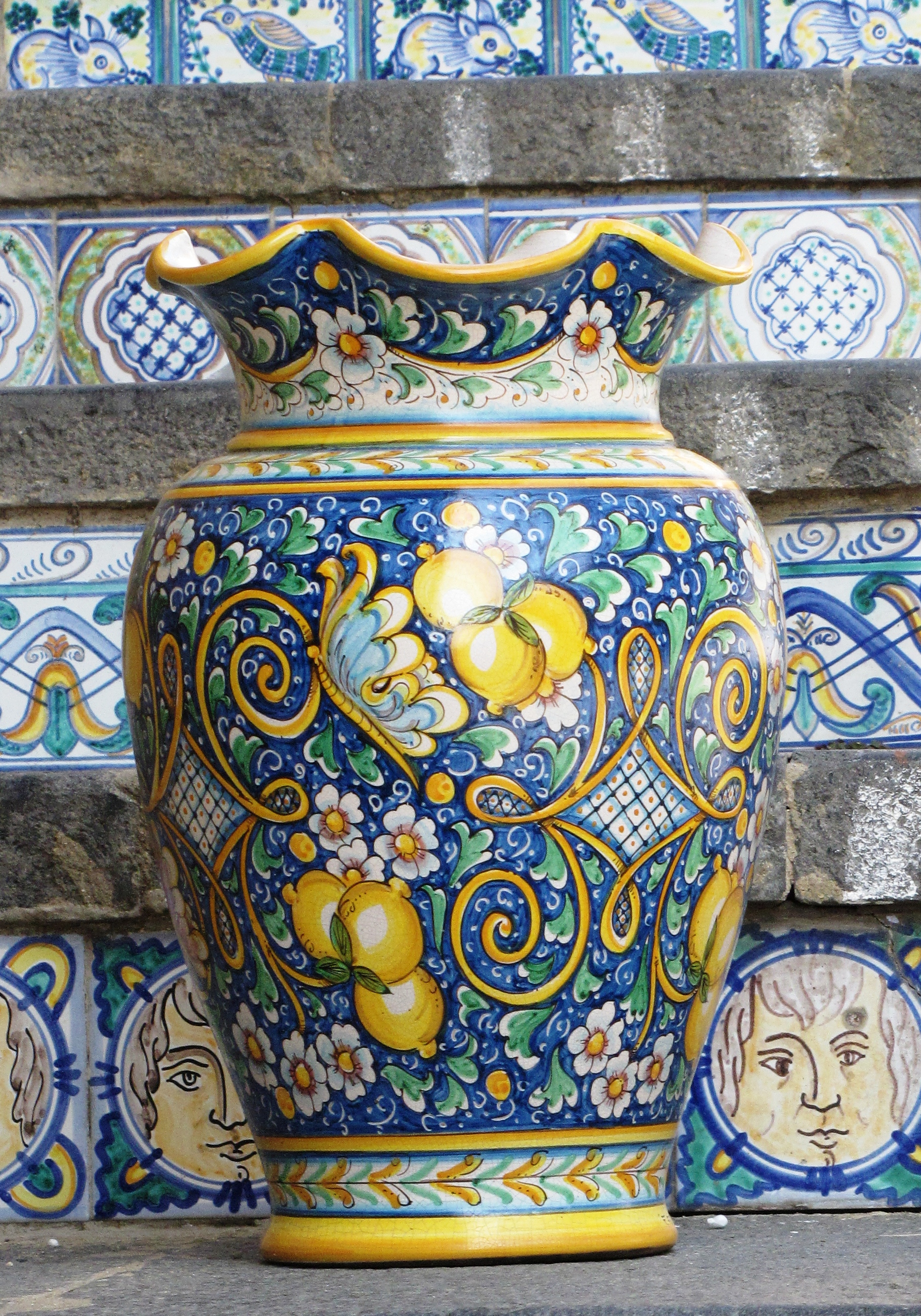
Ceramica di Caltagirone

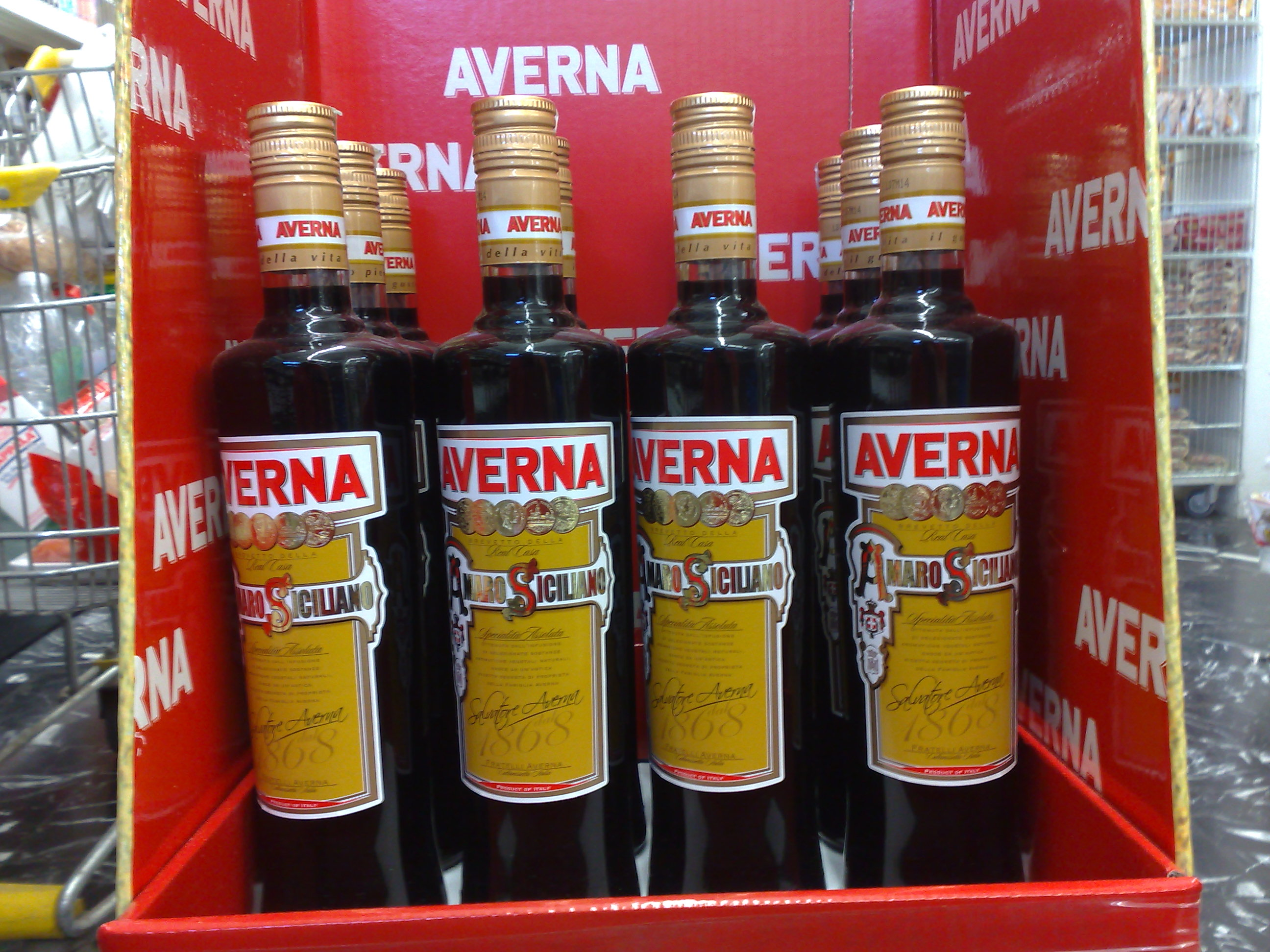
Amaro Averna

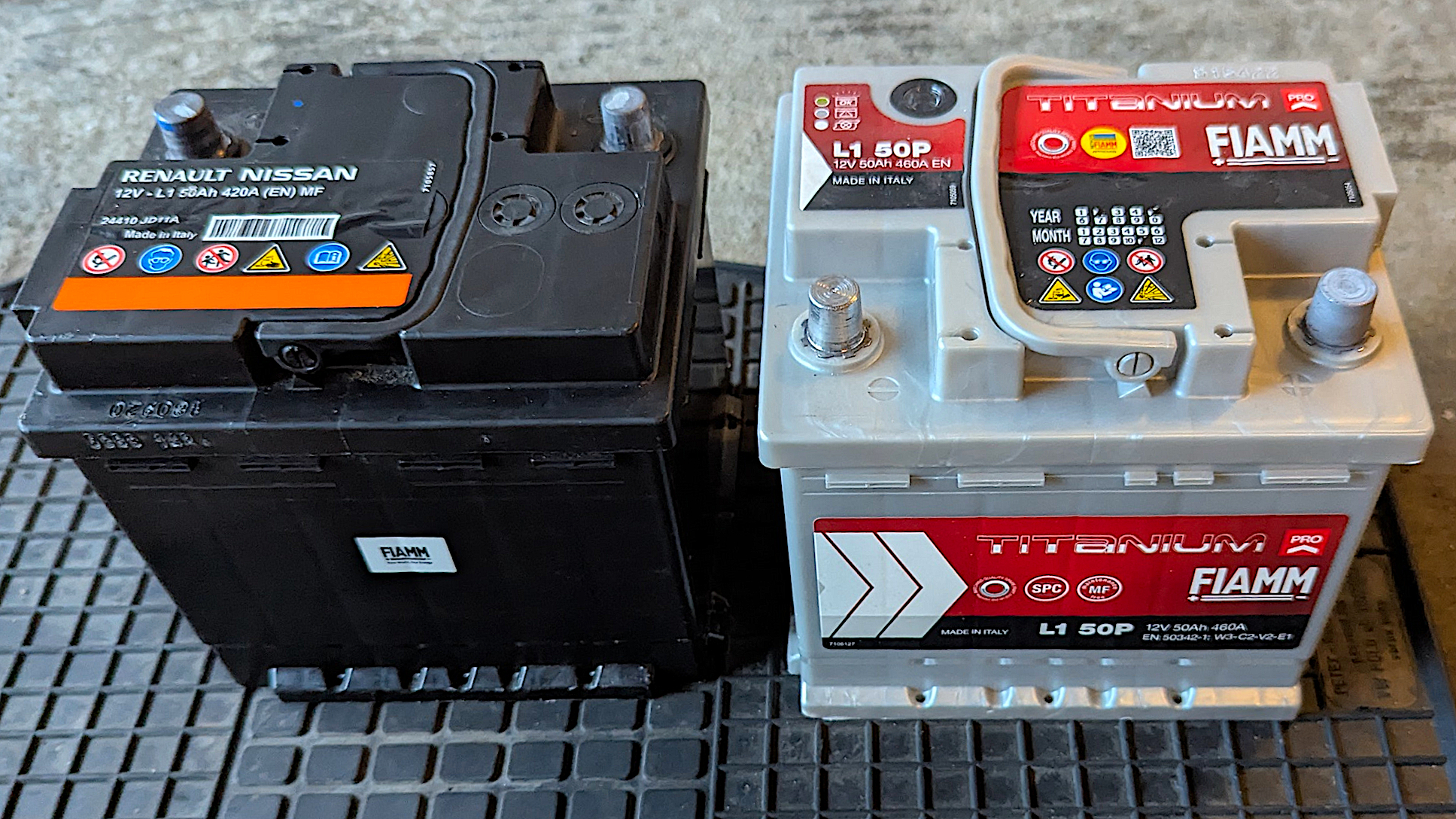
FIAMM batteries with "Made in Italy" printed on the case cover

Economists and business analysts have identified five companies in particular whose names are closely associated with Made in Italy:

- Barilla – food company;
- Benetton – global fashion brand;
- Ferrero – manufacturer of chocolate and other confectionery products;
- Indesit – home appliances; and
- Luxottica – the world's largest eyewear company.

=== Fashion and accessories ===
- Acqua di Parma
- Armani
- Berluti
- Bontoni
- Bottega Veneta
- Breil
- Brioni
- Brunello Cucinelli
- Buccellati
- Bulgari
- Calzedonia
- Canali
- Cerruti 1881
- Cesare Attolini
- Cesare Paciotti
- Corneliani
- Damiani
- Diesel
- Dolce & Gabbana
- E. Marinella
- Emilio Pucci
- Etro
- Fendi
- Fiorucci
- Gas Jeans
- Geox
- Gucci
- Harmont & Blaine
- Intimissimi
- Kiton
- Larusmiani
- Lardini
- Loro Piana
- Massimo Alba
- Marzotto
- Max Mara
- Missoni
- Miu Miu
- Moncler
- Moschino
- Officine Panerai
- Pal Zileri
- Persol
- Piquadro
- Prada
- Rifle
- Roberto Cavalli
- Rubinacci
- Safilo
- Salvatore Ferragamo
- Stefano Ricci
- Trussardi
- Valentino
- Versace
- Zegna

=== Foods and beverages ===
- Acqua Minerale San Benedetto
- Amedei
- Auricchio
- Autogrill
- Averna
- Amaro Lucano
- Balocco
- Berlucchi
- Buitoni
- Caffarel
- Campari
- Carapelli
- Cirio
- De Cecco
- Eataly
- Ferrari Trento
- F.lli Gancia
- Giovanni Rana
- Granarolo
- Illy
- La Molisana
- Lavazza
- Lazzaroni
- Loacker
- Martini & Rossi
- Massimo Zanetti
- Parmalat
- Perfetti Van Melle
- Perugina
- Saclà Italia
- San Carlo
- San Pellegrino
- Vicenzi
- Voiello

=== Furniture and home appliances ===
- Alessi
- Alivar
- Artemide
- Bertazzoni
- Bialetti
- B&B Italia
- Brionvega
- Bticino
- Candy
- Cassina
- De'Longhi
- Flexform
- Flou
- Indesit
- Jacuzzi
- Molinari
- Natuzzi
- Poltrona Frau
- Prandina
- Smeg
- Zanussi

=== Engineering ===
- Abarth
- Alfa Romeo
- Aprilia
- Atala
- Axis Group Yacht Design
- Azimut Yachts
- Benelli Armi SpA
- Benelli
- Benetti
- Bertone
- Bianchi Bicycles
- Bravo
- Brembo
- Campagnolo
- Cantiere Navale Visentini
- Carpigiani
- Carraro Agritalia
- Carrozzeria Castagna
- Carrozzeria Ghia
- Carrozzeria Marazzi
- Carrozzeria Touring
- Colnago
- Custom Line
- Danieli
- De Rosa
- De Simon
- De Tomaso
- Dell'Orto
- Di Blasi Industriale
- Ducati
- Fabio Perini S.p.A.
- Ferrari: according to Brand Finance, it was considered in 2020 the most influential and strongest brand in the world, and in 2021 it ranked second, overtaken by WeChat.
- Ferretti Group
- FIAMM
- Fiat
- Filippi Boats
- Fioravanti
- Franco Tosi Meccanica (FTM)
- Ghia
- Giannini Automobili
- I.DE.A Institute
- Italdesign Giugiaro
- Leonardo
- Lamborghini
- Lancia
- Maire Tecnimont
- Maserati
- MER MEC
- Moto Guzzi
- MV Agusta
- Officine Meccaniche Giovanni Cerutti
- Permasteelisa
- PFM Group
- Pinarello
- Piaggio
- Pininfarina
- Pirelli
- Riva Yachts
- Silca S.p.A.
- Sonus Faber
- Toscotec
- VM Motori
- Zagato

== Legislative references ==
- Law 350/2003;
  - amended by Law No. 99 of 23 July 2009 (Art. 4, paragraph 49; Art. 17, paragraph 4);
  - amended by Decree-Law No. 135 of 25 September 2009 (Art. 16), subsequently converted into Law No. 166 of 20 November 2009.
- Law No. 55 of 8 April 2010.

== See also ==
- 100% Made in Italy certification
- Italian design
- General Confederation of Italian Industry
- CE marking
- Decreto Ronchi
- National Single Mark
- Italian Sounding
