= Lardini =

Italian fashion house

- Type: S.p.A.
- Industry: Fashion
- Founded: 1978; 48 years ago Filottrano, Italy
- Founder: Luigi Lardini, Andrea Lardini, Lorena Lardini
- Headquarters: Filottrano, Italy
- Number of locations: 15 monobrand stores (2026)
- Area served: International boutiques: Milan, Tokyo, Moscow and Antwerp
- Key people: Luigi Lardini (Creative Director), Andrea Lardini, Lorena Lardini, Annarita Lardini
- Products: Men's tailoring
- Services: Fashion production, ready to wear, made to measure
- Revenue: c. €70 million (2025)
- Number of employees: over 400 internal, c. 700 including external suppliers
- Website: www.lardini.it

Lardini S.p.A. is an Italian luxury fashion house based in Filottrano, Ancona Province. The company was founded in 1978 by three siblings of the Lardini family; Luigi Lardini is its current creative director. Its garments can be distinguished by a signature lapel flower constructed from wool.

== History ==
The company was founded by the Lardini family in 1978 in Filottrano, a town in the Ancona Province of Italy. At the time of its founding, Luigi Lardini was 18 years old, his sister Lorena was 19 and his other sister Andrea Lardini was 21. It is famous for manufacturing men's tailoring for brands Dolce & Gabbana, Salvatore Ferragamo, Versace, Valentino, Etro and Burberry. Lardini produces a ready to wear tailoring line, which is retailed at its showroom in Milan and monobrand boutiques outside Italy. The company closed 2025 with revenue of around €70 million, with menswear accounting for approximately 90% of sales.

== Production ==
The company produces 1,600 garments per day at its headquarters in Filottrano, Italy. It exports 60% of its annual production. Lardini has created a collection with Nick Wooster.

== Retail and wholesale distribution ==
As of 2026, Lardini operates 15 monobrand stores worldwide, eight of which are in Japan, and is planning further openings in cities such as Paris and London over the following two years. Its boutiques include: Antwerpen, Milan (Via Gesu), Tokyo (Marunouchi), and Moscow (Petrovka Street and Krasnogorsk). Lardini garments are also sold in around 250 multibrand stores globally, including in Genoa and Chiavari. In East Asia the brand is sold at luxury department stores including Shinsegae, Daimaru, Takashimaya, Iwataya, Seibu, Mitsukoshi, and others. In Latin America, the brand is sold at Silver Deer in Mexico City.

== See also ==
- Italian fashion
- Made in Italy
- Massimo Alba
- Pal Zileri
