= Pal Zileri =

Italian menswear brand

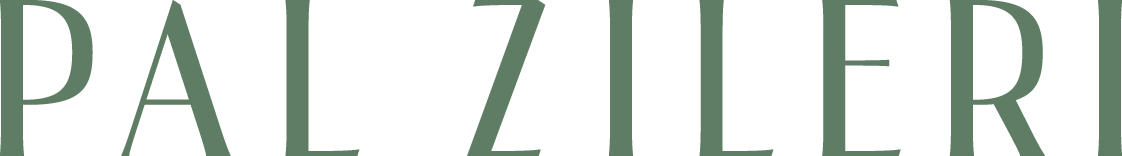
- Type: Joint Stock Company
- Industry: Fashion
- Founded: 1980, Quinto Vicentino (Vicenza, Italy)
- Headquarters: Via Roma, 13 Quinto Vicentino (Vicenza, Italy)
- Key people: Carlo Anceschi, CEO
- Products: Men's clothing, accessories, footwear
- Owner: Mayhoola for Investments LLC
- Number of employees: 50-100
- Website: palzileri.com

Pal Zileri is an Italian luxury menswear brand owned by the sovereign wealth fund of the Qatari royal family. Pal Zileri is part of Forall Confezioni SpA. The brand was founded in Quinto Vicentino (Vicenza, Italy) and is now headquartered in Milan. The brand is distributed via monobrand stores and 500 multibrand retailers worldwide. Carlo Anceschi is CEO, succeeding Leone Scordo.

== History ==
Forall Confezioni SpA was founded in 1980 as a company dedicated to the traditional menswear tailoring.

In the 1980s, the company created Pal Zileri as the brand to firm its identity and position based on the Italian savoir-faire and artisanal knowledge. Pal Zileri evokes the name of "Palazzo Zileri" an ancient building in the historic centre of Vicenza. Pal Zileri worked with some of the Italian designer labels to produce and distribute their menswear lines.

In 2014, Mayhoola Group acquired the majority stake of the company, and later, in 2016 gained the full ownership.

Further marking this new course, in July 2018 Marco Sanavia was appointed as chief executive officer of Forall Confezioni S.p.A., owner of Pal Zileri.

== Collections ==
Each Pal Zileri garment is made in the factory located in Quinto Vicentino or by the brand's network of selected Italian craftsmen. Pal Zileri line is designed for men and balances the Italian design tradition and innovation in terms of cut, design and materials. The collection is composed by formal menswear, casual and sportswear: suits, jackets, raincoats, overcoats, bomber jackets, pea jackets, slim fit pants, jacquard or printed shirts, leather goods, accessories (bags, backpacks, belts, etc.) and shoes.

Made to measure is a tailor-made and customized service that matches the Italian handcraft tradition with a wide range of models and fabrics.

== Distribution ==
The brand has mono-brand boutiques in Italy as well as Amman, Baku, Lyon, Málaga, and Mexico City. It is wholesale distributed in multi-brand stores. From 2019, the opening of Pal Zileri corners by top department stores such as Harrods and Selfridges in London, Galeries Lafayette and El Corte Ingles in Madrid.

== See also ==
- Italian fashion
- Made in Italy
- Massimo Alba
- Lardini
