= PFM =

PFM may refer to:

- Federal Ministerial Police (Policía Federal Ministerial), a Mexican federal agency tasked with fighting corruption and organized crime
- Pacific Fast Mail, a manufacturer of brass model trains
- Pen For Men, a 1959 model of the Sheaffer Pen Corporation
- Personal financial management, a class of online tools and services for money tracking, budgeting, and advice
- PFM Group (Pietro Fioravanti Machinery), an Italian multinational in the packaging and weighing machinery industry
- Phoenix Fuel Masters, a professional basketball team in the Philippines
- Photonic force microscope, an optical tweezer based method to measure forces in the range of several piconewtons
- Piezoresponse force microscopy, a technique typically used to investigate and manipulate ferroelectric domains on nanoscale dimensions
- Plasma-facing material, the material used to line the reactor vessel in a fusion power reactor
- Pontefract Monkhill railway station, England, United Kingdom; National Rail station code PFM
- Porcelain Fused to Metal, the most common type of dental crown
- Premiata Forneria Marconi, an Italian progressive rock band
- Printer Font Metrics, part of a Type 1 font description used by the Microsoft Windows operating system
- Pulse-frequency modulation
- PFM, a graphic image file format from Netpbm format
- PFM, the IATA code for Primrose Aerodrome, Alberta, Canada
