= Officine Meccaniche (disambiguation) =

Officine Meccaniche is an Italian car and truck manufacturing company.

Officine Meccaniche may also refer to:

- Officine Meccaniche (recording studio), in Milan, Italy
- Officine Meccaniche di Roma, a company acquired by Alfa Romeo after World War I

== See also ==
- Officine Meccaniche Giovanni Cerutti, known as Cerutti, an Italian manufacturer of printing presses
- Officine Meccaniche Reggiane, known as Reggiane, a defunct Italian industrial manufacturer and aviation company
