= Rachid Mohamed Rachid =

Egyptian businessman

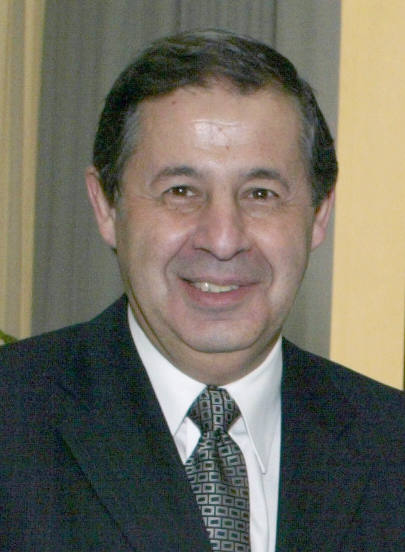
- Rachid in 2005

Founder Alsara Investment Group; CEO Mayhoola; Chairman of Valentino and Balmain

Personal details
- Born: Rachid Mohamed Rachid; 2 September 1955 (age 71) Alexandria, Egypt
- Occupation: Entrepreneur; Investor

Rachid Mohamed Rachid or Rasheed Mohamed Rasheed (born 9 February 1955) is an Egyptian born entrepreneur and investor. He is the founder and chairman of Alsara Investment Group, an international investment group focused on the luxury and well being industry and including its subsidiary Bidayat, a company focused on investing and nurturing young brands in jewelry, fashion and accessories and take them globally. He is also the chairman of the international fashion houses of Valentino and Balmain. His foray into the creative and fashion industries led Business of Fashion magazine to name him as one of 500 most influential people shaping the global fashion industry. Rachid is also on the supervisory board of Lipton Teas and Infusions. Prior to that Rachid held a cabinet position in Egypt as Minister of Trade and Industry between 2004 and 2011. Prior to his cabinet position Rachid was the founder and chairman of a JV with Unilever in Egypt and was named as President of Unilever MENA and Turkey.

== Biography ==
=== Personal life and education ===
Rachid Mohamed Rachid was born on 2 February 1955 in Alexandria, Egypt. He received his B.Sc. in mechanical engineering from the Faculty of Engineering at Alexandria University in 1978. He has attended a number of management programs in the United States, including the Management Development Program at Stanford University in 1983, the Strategic Management Program at MIT in 1993, and the Advanced Management Program at Harvard Business School in 1996. Rachid is married and has 3 daughters. In 2024 Rachid was granted Italian citizenship by the president of the Republic citing "For entrepreneurial commitment, together with deep knowledge and sincere closeness to Italian culture .."

== Business career ==
=== Early career ===
Rachid started his career in the 80s with his first venture as the bottler of Coca Cola in Egypt. Later in the early nineties he grew the family business of Fine Foods, one of the first local manufacturers of frozen foods. In 1991, Unilever, the leading global consumer goods company acquired shares in the company and named Rachid chairman of Unilever Egypt, which also made him responsible for business development in the Middle East. He was later appointed as President of Unilever's Middle East, North Africa and Turkey business based out of London. In 2004 Rachid left the management of the company as he was asked by the then Prime Minister of Egypt Ahmed Nazif to join the cabinet where he remained until the 2011 Revolution in Egypt after which he restarted his business career.

=== Chairmanship of Valentino and Balmain ===
As CEO of Mayhoola, a Qatari royal family fund, Rachid led the fund’s acquisition of the Italian fashion icon Valentino in July 2012 for a reported figure of EUR 700 million. Rachid was appointed Chairman of Valentino and oversaw the turn around of the business by changing key managerial positions, and putting a new strategy to establish the brand as a maison de couture. These changes led to the quadrupling of Valentino’s revenue by 2023 to EUR 1.2bn. In July 2023 Mayhoola sold 30% of Valentino to fashion giant Kering Group for a reported figure of EUR 1.87 billion in cash. It was reported that this transaction is part of a broader relationship between Mayhoola and Kering which might lead in Mayhoola owning shares in Kering. In June 2016 Mayhoola acquired the Paris based fashion house Balmain for a reported figure of EUR 485 million and Rachid was appointed as Chairman and also oversaw the transformation of the business and the tripling of its revenue to EUR 300m by 2023.

=== Alsara Investment Group and Bidayat ===
Post the 2011 revolution and his exit from political life Rachid wanted to go back into business and having sold his remaining 40% of the Unilever joint venture which at the time boasted a capitalization of USD 2bn, he decided to focus on Luxury. In 2017 Rachid established Alsara Investment Group to become an international private investment company focused on the luxury and well-being sector. Alsara has over USD 2bn in assets under management and focuses primarily on markets in the Middle East, North Africa and Europe. Alsara owns brands such as Akoni, a Swiss based eyewear company it launched in 2019, Khrisjoy an Italian outerwear company it acquired in 2021 and in 2023 it acquired the IP and Archive of the 1970 fashion label Walter Albini with the reported aim of relaunching the brand. Alsara also founded Bidayat a company which invests in and nurtures creative local and regional brands with the aim of growing them internationally. In 2021 and 2022 respectively it invested in Okhtein and Azza Fahmy two Middle Eastern brands founded and led by women entrepreneurs. In 2021 Bidayat also signed an MoU with the Sovereign Fund of Egypt to study the transformation of the historic area of Bab El Azab in the heart of historic Cairo into the first integrated creativity zone in the Middle East and Africa.

== Political career ==
Rachid became Egypt's minister of foreign trade and industry in July 2004. Two years later, the ministry was expanded to include domestic trade within Egypt and was renamed the Ministry of Trade and Industry (MTI). In 2010 he was also made acting investment minister. He has been described as one of the few reformer ministers and that he led liberal economic measures that included sale of major state assets and sharp reductions in income taxes and tariffs. Rachid was a member of the government's new 'economic team' tasked with delivering a program of reforms to open Egypt up to international trade and investment. As Minister of Trade and Industry, his mandate included liberalizing Egypt's industrial sectors, attracting foreign direct investment into industry, and creating jobs. He is responsible for Egypt's foreign trade portfolio, managing Egypt's network of preferential trade agreements (with United States, Europe, Africa and the Middle East) and growing Egyptian exports. Rachid also oversaw Egypt's internal trade market and was responsible for the creation and supporting of Egypt's first Competition and Consumer Protection Authorities Rachid pioneered public-private partnerships by involving members of the private sector in the government policy formulation process. Rachid also worked to harmonize Egypt's industrial policies with its international commitments and thus enable Egyptian industrialists and traders to benefit from Egypt's existing trade agreements. In this regard he signed important trade agreements such as the Qualifying Industrial Zones Protocol (QIZs), and free trade agreements with Turkey and the European Free Trade Area.

In January 2011 following mass protests against the Mubarak’s regime the former president dismissed the entire cabinet in a failed bid to remain in Power. Rachid traveled to Dubai on 1 February 2011, soon after he and several other ministers and colleagues had their assets frozen and barred from leaving the country. In 2011 He was charged on two separate charges (on which he was later acquitted) which included embezzlement and misuse of public funds and tried in absentia and given lengthy prison sentences in addition to financial fines including an additional 15 years in prison on corruption charges and fined an additional E£1.4 billion.

In December 2016 a judicial committee approved a settlement agreement with Rachid after reviewing official reports that confirmed Rachid’s innocence, and verified that the wealth and investments of the former minister’s family existed before his appointment as minister in 2004. In March 2017 all freeze on his assets in Egypt and abroad were finally lifted.

In 2016 Rachid reached a deal with Egypt's Asset Recovery Committee after he was able to prove his finances and investments existed prior to his appointment to the Ministry in 2004. He returned to Egypt in 2017.

== Main Roles and Honors ==
- Chairman and founder of Alsara Investment Group
- CEO of Mayhoola
- Chairman of Valentino
- Chairman of Balmain
- Supervisory Board Member of Lipton Tea and Fusions
- Member of the Harvard Business School alumni
- Member of the World Economic Forum
- Holder of "Cavaliere di Gran Croce, Ordine al Merito della Repubblica Italiana"

Political offices
Preceded by Ali El-Saeedi as Minister of Industry	Minister of Trade and Industry; July 2004 – January 2011	Incumbent
Preceded by Youssef Boutros-Ghali as Minister of Foreign Trade	Minister of Trade and Industry; July 2004 – January 2011	Incumbent
