= Mayhoola for Investments =

Qatari investment company

- Type: State-owned enterprise
- Headquarters: Doha, Qatar
- Key people: Rachid Mohamed Rachid (CEO)
- Owner: Government of Qatar
- Website: www.mayhoola.com

Mayhoola for Investments LLC or simply Mayhoola is an investment holding incorporated under the laws of the State of Qatar, and located in Doha, Qatar. The group is managed and owned by the Qatar royal family.

Mayhoola is a Qatari investment fund that focuses on local and global investments on the luxury sector. It is headquartered in the 36th Floor at Tornado Tower, West Bay.

== Investments ==
In 2012 the fund purchased Valentino Fashion Group, which consisted of Valentino and licensed M Missoni brand. M Missoni became part of Missoni in 2018.

Also in 2012, Mayhoola purchased a controlling stake in Anya Hindmarch which was sold to the Marandi family in 2019. A 65% controlling stake in Pal Zileri was also acquired in 2014, later becoming a 100% stake in 2016.

Balmain was purchased in 2016.

In 2023, Mayhoola sold a 30% stake in Valentino to the French luxury group Kering for 1.7 billion euros. The deal gave Kering an option to buy the remaining 70%. Kering's full acquisition of Valentino, first planned from 2026, was later deferred to 2028 at the earliest. As of March 2026, Mayhoola owned 70% of Valentino and Kering 30%.

List of Mayhoola investments
Name	Year founded	Year acquired	Type of business	Notes
Balmain	1945	2016	Fashion house	
Beymen	1971	2015	Department stores	54% acquired in 2015, 97% holding as of 2019
Valentino	1960	2012	Fashion house	30% stake sold to Kering in 2023
Pal Zileri	1980	2014	Fashion house	Majority stake acquired in 2015, full ownership since 2016
