= FIAMM =

Manufacturer of electric equipment

FIAMM Energy Technology S.p.A.
- Type: Società per azioni
- Industry: Electrical equipment
- Founded: 1942
- Headquarters: Montecchio Maggiore, Italy
- Area served: Worldwide
- Key people: Fujio Owa (CEO)
- Products: Batteries
- Revenue: 427,000,000 (2021)
- Owner: Aurelius Group
- Website: www.fiamm.com

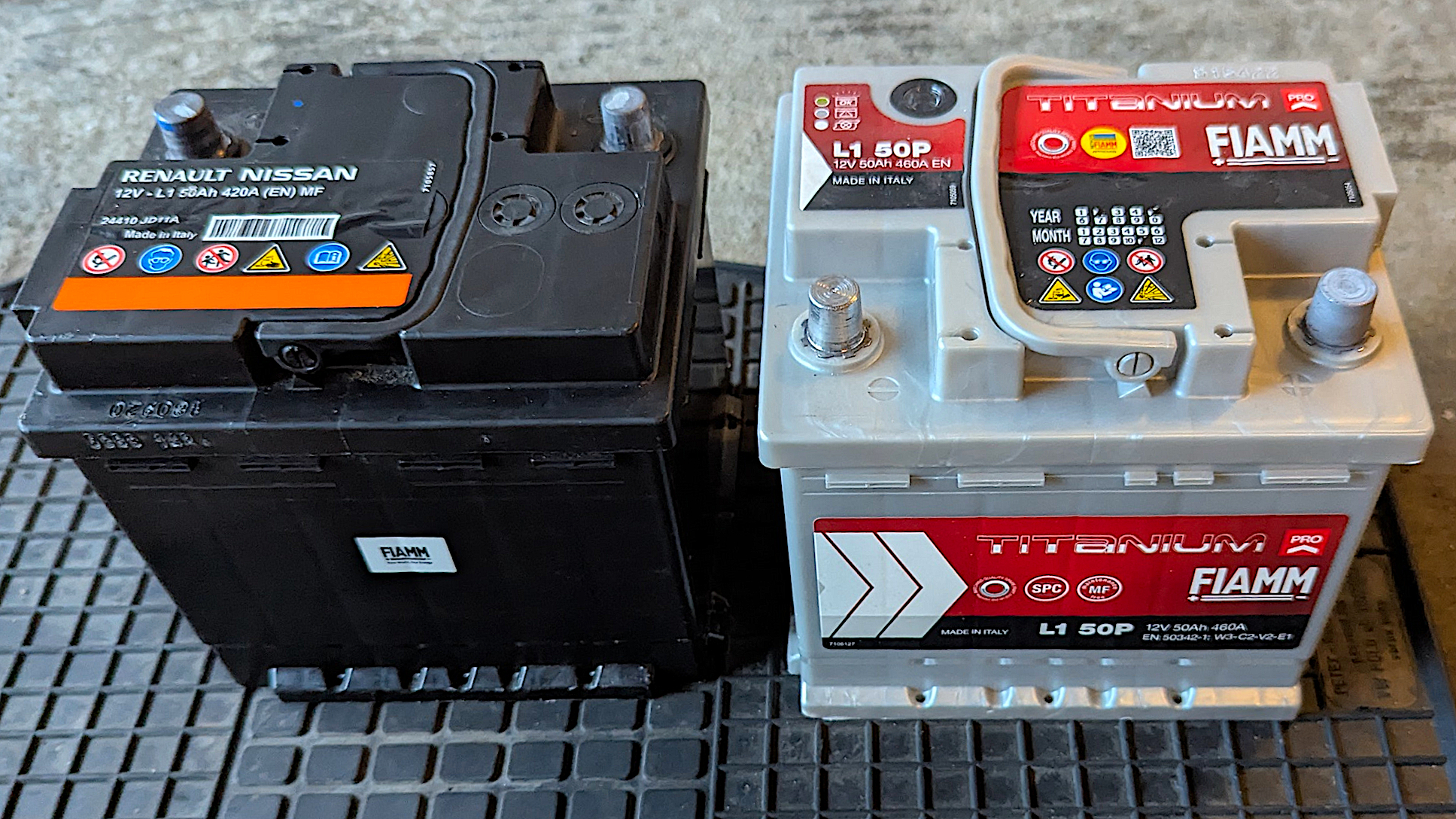
FIAMM batties (Made in Italy) used by Renault

FIAMM Energy Technology (FIAMM) is an Italian company engaged in the production and distribution of car batteries and accumulators for motor vehicles and for industrial use owned by Aurelius Group since 2025.

The company was founded following the separation from FIAMM Group of the automotive batteries and industrial batteries with lead-acid technology division.

== History ==
The company was founded in 1942 as FIAMM (Fabbrica Italiana Accumulatori Motocarri Montecchio). The production focused on electric traction and automotive starter batteries.

In 1950 FIAMM exhibited in motor shows together with the major car manufacturers. A FIAMM battery was fitted in the Ferrari that won the Mille Miglia race in 1950. The first OE supply for a major brand was for Innocenti's Lambretta.

In the 1970s, FIAMM became an OEM for the most important European car manufacturers. In the stationary battery sector, the company could boast major operators such as SIP and Enel among its customers.

Since 1980 the company exported stationary batteries to the USA and entered the two main European markets with FIAMM Germany and FIAMM France. It continued to present itself in the world of sports in Rally, F1, Formula Indy, Paris Dakar and Offshore.

In the 1990s, the Company appointed a new generation of professional management.

In the 2000s there was the opening of new plants abroad, acquisition of multiple battery distributors across Europe and significant investments in technology.

In 2015, a Korean partner for OLED was identified, on November 28, 2016, an agreement was signed for an Italian-Japanese joint venture with Hitachi Ltd.

In 2017 Hitachi Chemical acquired the 51% of the shares of FIAMM Energy Technology S.p.A.) with an operation of 86 million euros (52 million paid by Hitachi and another 34 for the increase of capital of the new FET). President became Misao Nakagawa, CEO Yasuhiko Nakayama. 49% remained in the FIAMM Group.

In 2020 Showa Denko acquired 100% of Hitachi Chemical's shares which from October 1 changes its name to Showa Denko Materials Co.

In December 2025 the international investor Aurelius completed the full acquisition of all FIAMM shares from Resonac (formerly Showa Denko).

== Financial Data ==
The company has over 1,000 employees at two production facilities, with sales revenue of €377 million in fiscal year 2024.
