= Valentino Fashion Group =

Italian consortium of luxury fashion companies

- Industry: Fashion
- Founded: 2005; 21 years ago
- Owner: Mayhoola for Investments
- Website: valentinofashiongroup.com

The Valentino Fashion Group is an Italian consortium of luxury fashion companies currently owned by the Qatari royal family.

In 2002, the Valentino fashion house was purchased by the Marzotto Group, joining a group that included Hugo Boss, and licensed products for Gianfranco Ferre, M Missoni, and MCS Marlboro Classics. In 2005, Marzotto spun off Valentino and its other fashion brands into the Valentino Fashion Group.

As a result of a takeover bid made in the second half of 2007, Valentino Fashion Group S.p.A. passed under the control of Permira, a private equity fund. Until 23 December 2009, there were three business units, which even included Hugo Boss, a company which was relinquished on that date and therefore no longer a part of the consolidated group.

On 11 July 2012, Mayhoola for Investments, sustained by a large private group from Qatar, purchased Valentino and the M Missoni licence, while MCS Marlboro Classics remains the property of Red & Black, a company indirectly owned by the Permira funds in partnership with the Marzotto family.
