= Walter Albini =

Italian fashion designer (1941–1983)

Gualtiero Angelo Albini (3 March 1941 – 31 May 1983), known professionally as Walter Albini was an Italian fashion designer who eventually started his own eponymous fashion house and became known for his gender fluid designs, with his collections featuring both male and female models. In 2023, the rights to his fashion house were bought by Bidayat, an investment company created by Rachid Mohamed Rachid.

== Early life ==
Albini was born on 3 March 1941 in Busto Arszio, Italy as Gualtiero Angelo Albini.

After graduating from the Istituto d’ Arte per il disegno di Moda (Institute of Art, Design and Fashion) in Turin (where he was the only and first male student) at age 17 he moved to Rome and started making sketches of fashion shows for different magazines and newspapers. In 1961 he moved to Paris, France and continued making fashion sketches.

== Personal life and career ==
During his time in Paris he met Coco Chanel and worked alongside Karl Lagerfeld. He left Paris in 1965 and moved to Milan.

For his Autumn 1972 show at Milan Fashion Week, Albini designed for five different houses (Basile, Callaghan, Escargots, Misterfox and Sportfox) and displayed the collections all in one show, which occurred at the Sala d'Ora in the Circolo del Giardino and featured hundreds of models.

His Autumn/Winter 1973-74 show was held at the Caffè Florian in Venice.

== Death ==
Walter Albini died on 31 May 1983 at age 42. His cause of death is presumably of AIDS.

== Revival ==
In 2023, the rights to his fashion house were bought by Bidayat, an investment company created by Rachid Mohamed Rachid who is the chairman of Valentino and Balmain. Bidayat also purchased the personal Walter Albini archive of Barbara Curti which the majority of was collected by her mother Marisa Curti, the archive includes pieces of clothing, costume jewellery, drawings, photographs and more.

== Legacy ==
Albini has been credited as being the start of brands showing collections in Milan and not in Florence.

In the 1988 book Walter Albini, lo stile nella moda, Karl Lagerfeld said that Albini had “splendid, perfect, impeccable drawings,” and that “He has been surpassed by others with more financial skills, but few can say to have his talent,”.

Alessandro Michele stated that Albini was an inspiration for his F/W 2016 Menswear collection for Gucci.

Albini was featured in three episodes of the 2019 TV Show Made in Italy, he was played by Gaetano Bruno. The show was directed by Luca Lucini and Ago Panini.

It was announced in an interview by WWD that Carla Sozzani was planning an exhibition for May 2024 at the Museo del Tessuto in Prato, Italy.
