= Italian Sounding =

Marketing phenomenon

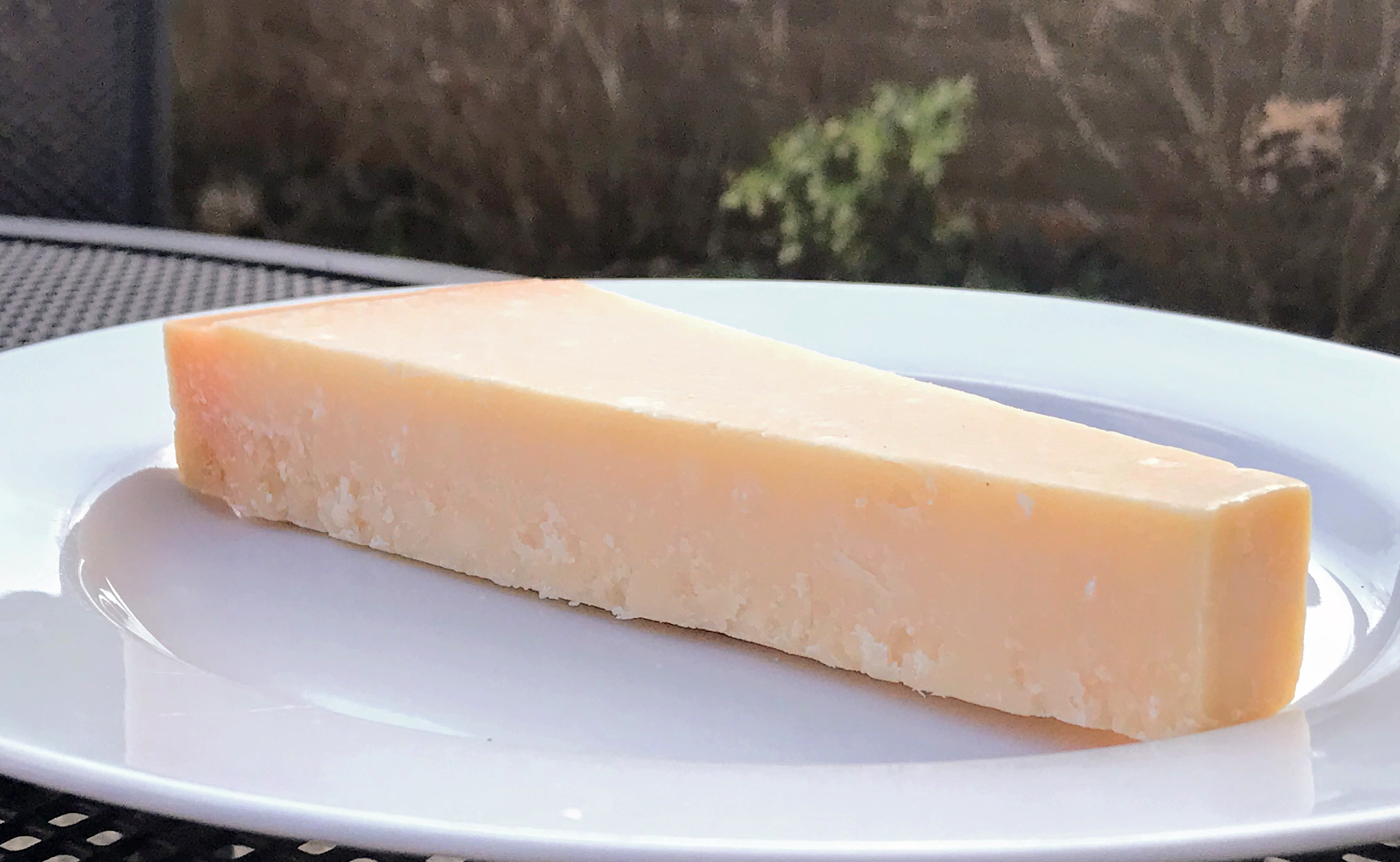
Parmigiano Reggiano

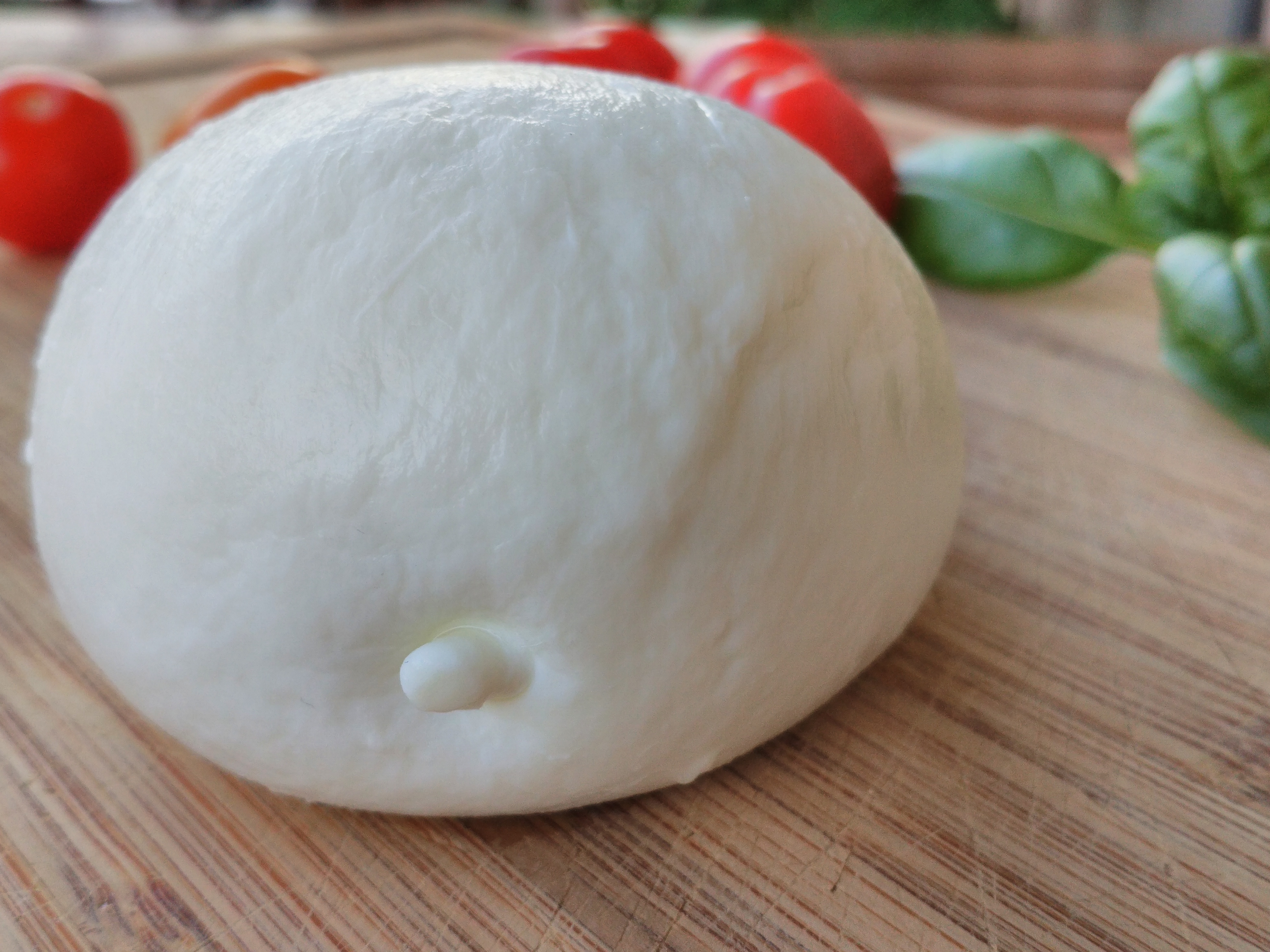
Mozzarella di bufala

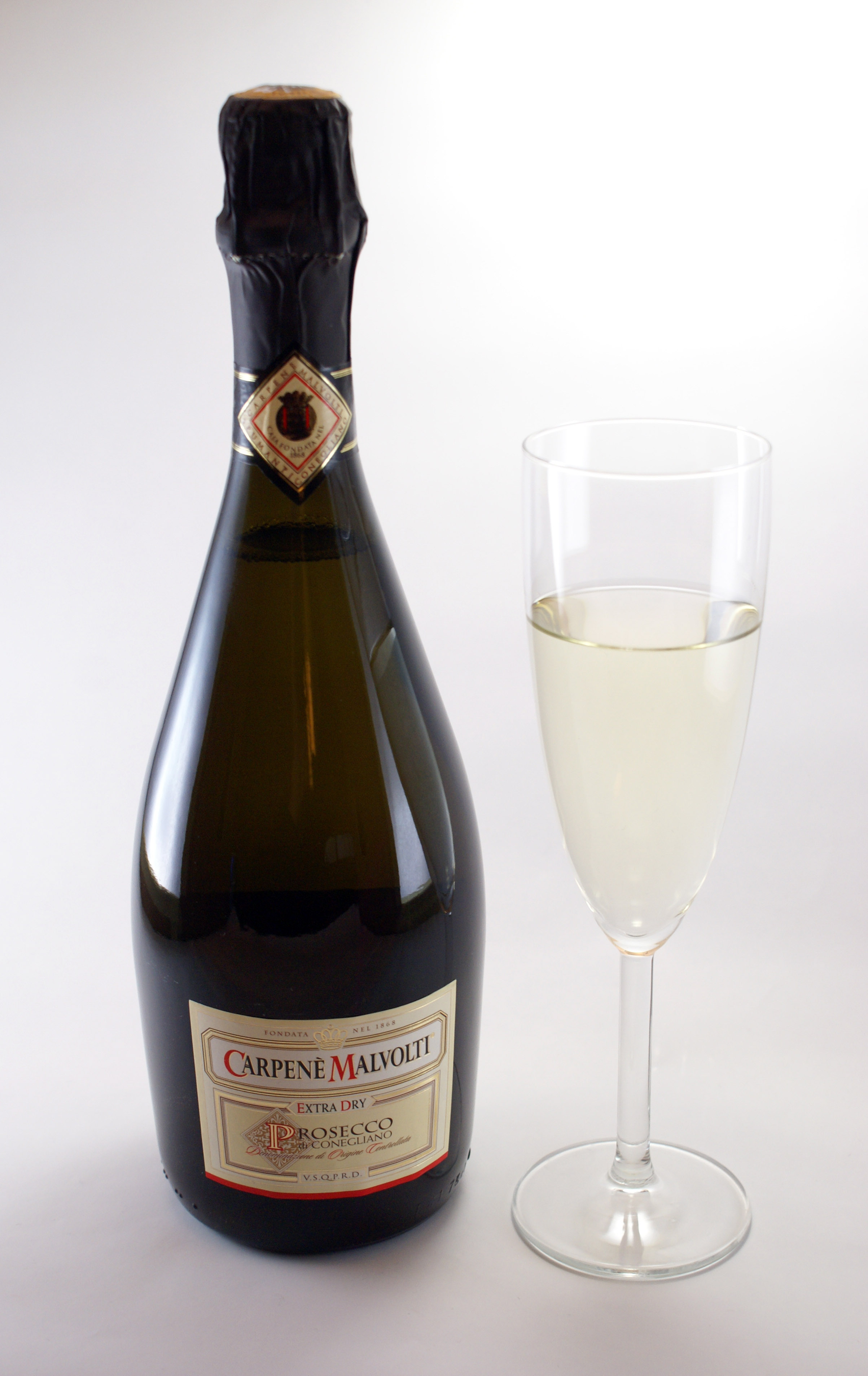
Prosecco

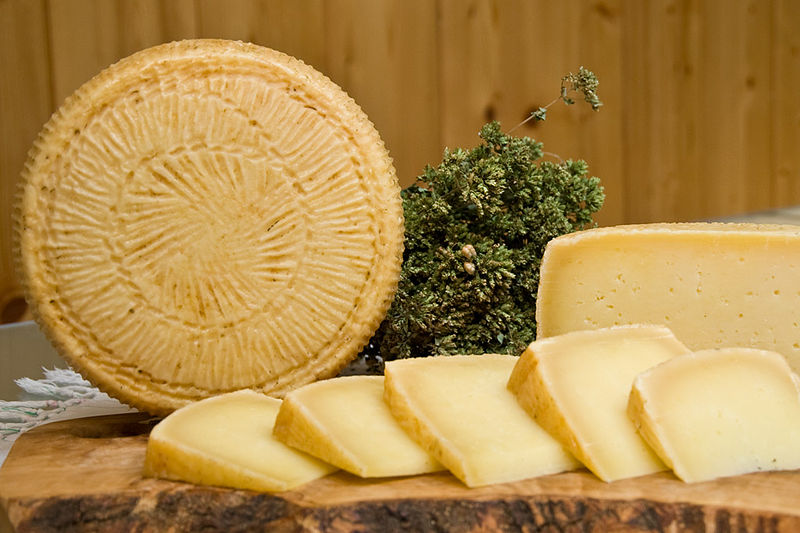
Pecorino

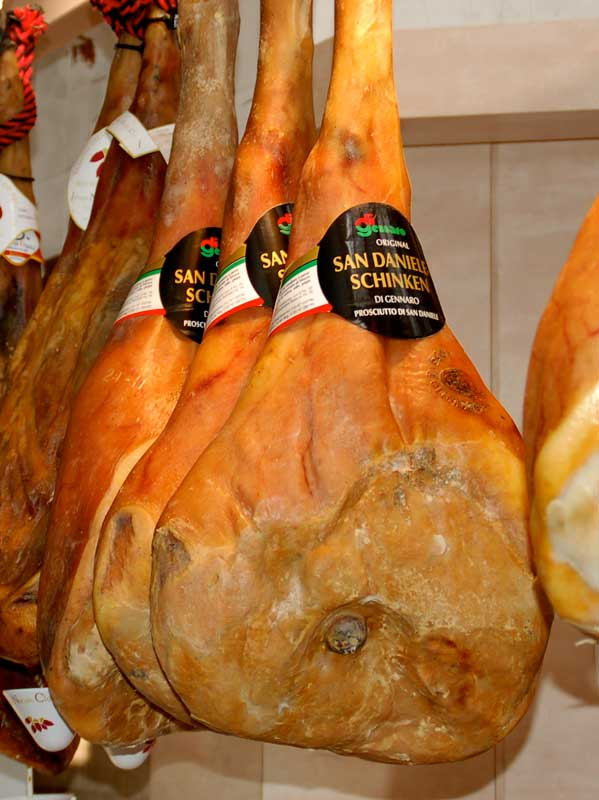
Prosciutto di San Daniele

Italian Sounding is the marketing phenomenon consisting of words and images, colour combinations (the Italian tricolour), and geographical references for brands that are evocative of Italy to promote and market agri-food products that have nothing to do with Italian cuisine. The phenomenon is described by the Office of the Ministry of Economic Development (MISE) called Directorate General for the Protection of Industrial Property – Italian Patent and Trademark Office (DGTPI-UIBM).

Italian Sounding began gaining media coverage during the final stages of Expo 2015, hosted by Milan, Italy, and having the theme of "Feeding the Planet, Energy for Life". As part of a debate held in the "Cibus è Italia" pavilion on the problem of counterfeiting and Italian Sounding, the Government of Italy was asked to set up a "permanent observatory on Italian Sounding".

Counterfeit products violate registered trademarks or other distinctive signs protected by law such as the designations of origin (DOC, PDO, DOCG, PGI, TSG, and IGT), therefore the counterfeiting is legally punishable. Italian Sounding cannot be classified as illegal from a strictly legal standpoint but still represents "a huge damage to the Italian economy and to the potential resources of Made in Italy". Two out of three Italian agri-food products sold worldwide are made outside of Italy. The Italian Sounding phenomenon is estimated to generate €55 billion worldwide annually.

== Origins and size of the phenomenon ==
The origins of the Italian Sounding phenomenon are largely linked to the Italian diaspora and those who, between the end of the 19th century and the first decades of the 20th, went abroad in search of a better life. Those Italians, mostly directed to North and South America, and to European countries including France, Germany, and Switzerland, brought with them traditions and recipes that have changed over time, from generation to generation, also due to a process of adaptation to the destination country.

Due to globalization, the appreciation for the culture and food and wine of Italy has spread, even within places not directly affected by these large migratory flows. This diffusion has generated a demand that is often not adequately informed in terms of the actual typicality and quality of original Italian products, or such products can hardly be reached. This offers the opportunity for companies to place products on the market with names, graphics, or other elements that somehow refer to Italy, even if they have nothing to do with Italian cuisine. These aspects are also discussed in the 2017 Italo-Argentine documentary Food on the Go.

== Activities, studies, and law enforcement ==
To counter the Italian Sounding phenomenon in foreign markets, the Italian Trade Agency and Italy's Ministry of Foreign Affairs have collaborated on a series of activities in countries including the United States, Canada, and Russia, in which Made in Italy is successful. In particular, the joint initiative called Task Force Canada, between 2011 and 2012, served as a model for a similar, albeit shorter, initiative that took place in Russia in February 2013 on the occasion of the 20th Exhibition ProdExpo international food in Moscow. For the two-year period 2018–2020, the MISE and the Italian Customs Agency have signed a Memorandum of Understanding relating to training initiatives aimed at young people against counterfeiting and Italian Sounding.

Other institutions committed to countering the Italian Sounding phenomenon are both DGTPI–UIBM, the Polizia di Stato, the Carabinieri, and the Guardia di Finanza. They are particularly active on the front of what is called an "insidious reality ... : the Italian Sounding of Italian origin, represented for example by the action of those who import raw materials (milk, meat, and oil) from the most varied countries, transform it and obtain products that are later sold as Italian through dumping mechanisms that damage the real Made in Italy".

Many private companies have mobilized to make original Italian products known abroad. A Neapolitan startup company created an app that, by scanning the barcode on the packaging of a product, tells if the product is truly Made in Italy or not, and if not, to report the product. In 2021, Robert Campana created a social media movement in the United States, named Stop Italian Sounding, aiming to create awareness on the topic with the use of educational videos.

== Most counterfeited Italian products ==
Two out of three Italian agri-food products sold worldwide are actually fakes that have nothing to do with Italian cuisine. The Italian Sounding phenomenon is estimated to generate €55 billion worldwide annually. The most counterfeited Italian products in the world are as follows:

- Parmigiano Reggiano
- Mozzarella di bufala
- Prosecco
- Pecorino
- Gorgonzola
- Grana Padano
- Prosciutto di San Daniele
- Asiago
- Chianti
- Salame
