= Prandina =

- Industry: Lighting and design
- Founded: 1982
- Headquarters: Bassano del Grappa (VI), Italy
- Website: www.prandina.it

Prandina is a manufacturer of lighting products. It is based in Italy and was founded in 1982.

== History ==
Prandina was founded in 1982.

In April 2013, Prandina exhibited at Triennale di Milano during the Milan Design Week. The artistic installation, entitled "Sand, Fire and Air", came from the idea of the designer Filippo Protasoni, whose aim was to narrate the story of glass starting from its material origin: the sand.

== Description ==
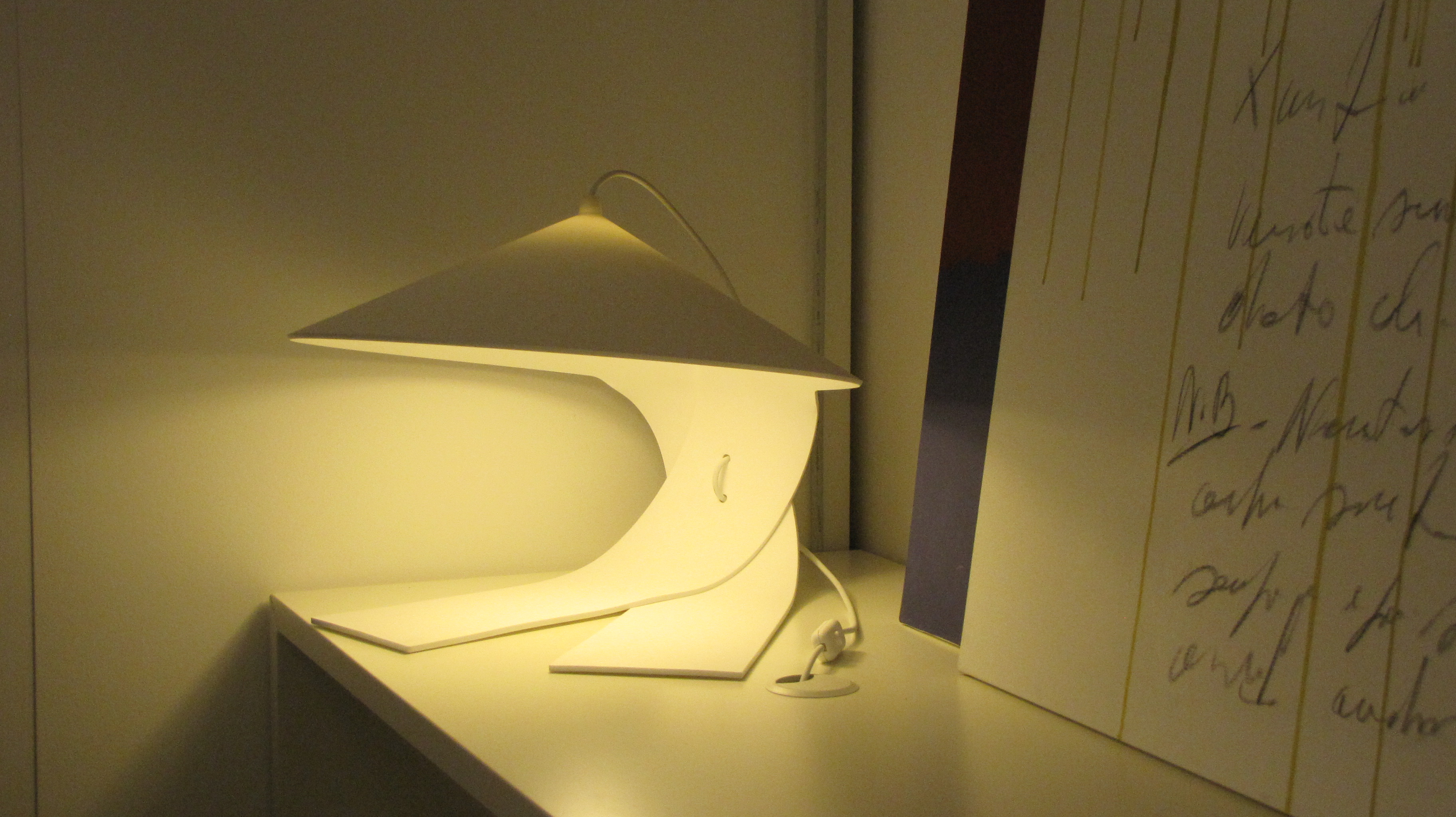
The Hanoi lamp.

Prandina is a manufacturer of lighting products. The company is a member of ADI – Associazione per il Disegno Industriale (Association for the Industrial Design). Prandina is present in the markets of Europe, North and South America, Middle East and Asian countries.

Glass is the main material used in Prandina’s products (floor lamps, ceiling lamps, wall lamps, table lamps and suspension lamps) even if lately we have seen an increase of the use of different materials that better reproduce the basic idea of some projects. Prandina is involved both with the achievement and the design of its products. Prandina, for the achievement of the products, uses brass, stainless steel, others electrical components and the glass blowing and mould pressing techniques together with more modern procedures.

The company studies and develops design products with its own technical department and can count on the collaboration of various designers belonging both to the Italian and international scene, including Mario Mengotti, Admiraal Captein, Bakerygroup, Federico Churba, Serge Cornelissen design office, Katja Hettler / Jula Tüllmann, Theodor Neumaier, Stefano Olivieri, Alberto Pasetti, Per Kristian Pettersen, Christian Ploderer, Philip Protasoni, Luc Ramael, Sandro Santantonio Design.

== Awards ==
- 2012: grandesignEtico Award with the Hanoi table lamp
