= Toscotec =

Toscotec S.p.A.
- Company type: Corporation (S.p.A.)
- Industry: Mechanical and plant equipment for Tissue, Paper and Board industries
- Founded: 1948; 78 years ago
- Headquarters: Marlia, Province of Lucca, Italy
- Parent: Voith
- Website: www.toscotec.com

Toscotec is an Italian company specialized in the design and manufacture of plant and equipment for the production of tissue paper and paper board, as well as for stock preparation. This is a privately owned Italian group based in the province of Lucca, in Tuscany.

Toscotec, whose head office is located in Marlia, Lucca, has branches in the United States and China. Toscotec North America is in Green Bay, Wisconsin and Toscotec Paper Machine (Shanghai) Co., Ltd. is in the Gaohang district of Shanghai.

== History ==
Toscotec, originally named Officine Meccaniche Toschi, was founded in 1948 by Sergio Toschi as a service provider for paper mills in Tuscany. In the 1950s, the company began engineering and producing the first complete machine for paper manufacturing. It was the first company to manufacture dryer cylinders in steel instead of cast iron.

The name Officine Meccaniche Toschi was officially changed to Toscotec in 2003. In 2006 the Mennucci family became the sole shareholders of the company. At the beginning of 2012, Toscotec became full owner of Milltech, a company specialized in drying and energy solutions for the tissue industry, and consolidated its commercial and service network in the Far East through its associate Toscotec Paper Machine (Shanghai) Co., Ltd., in end 2012. In addition to their growth in Asia, the company has also had recent success in Russia and South America.

Today, Toscotec operates with a group of companies, Toscotec Tech, which comprises the parent company and its affiliates Milltech and S.to.ri.

== Corporate Structure ==
Toscotec is headed by CEO Alessandro Mennucci and it's part of Voith Company since 2019. Internally, the company has two divisions. The Tissue Division, which designs and engineers tissue machinery, plants and turnkey projects. The Paper & Board Division does turnkey project and refits existing paper production equipment.

== See also ==
- Tissue paper
- Paperboard
- Paper mills
- Steel
- Cast iron
- Papermaking
- Converting
- Turnkey
- TAPPI
