= Larusmiani =

Italian clothing and textile brand

Larusmiani is an Italian luxury clothing and high-end textile brand established in 1922.

== Background ==
Larusmiani was founded in 1922 by Guglielmo Miani, a tailor catering to local artists and Italian actors. He opened his first store in 1929. He was the first person to import vicuña wool to Italy.

His son joined the shop at the age of 14, and developed a textile collection which he commercialized to French and Italian tailors.

In 1965, Prince Philip, Duke of Edinburgh visited a Larusmiani store in Milan, the company being the largest importer of British textiles in Italy. In 1970, Guglielmo Miani was entitled Officer of the Most Excellent Order of the British Empire.

The Larusmiani Concept Boutique has been located in Milan on Via Montenapoleone since 1954.

In 2007, Guglielmo Miani, grandson of the founder, was named CEO of Larusmiani. In November 2013, Larusmiani acquired the high-end men's grooming brand G. Lorenzi to give it a second breath within the Via Montenapoleone store.

== Description ==
Larusmiani hires 40 master tailors, and produces and distributes more than 2 million metres of fabric a year, created using cotton, wool, cashmere and linen fibres.

Its logo is the larus, which is Latin for "seagull".

Larusmiani shows its collections at Milan Fashion Week. Some Larusmiani-branded products are distributed by J.Crew.

== See also ==
- Brioni
- Canali
- Loro Piana
- Ermenegildo Zegna
- Bottega Veneta
- Kiton
