= Ali Bar =

Village in Kermanshah, Iran

Ali Bar عالي بر
- Village
- Location within Iran
- Coordinates: 34°10′57″N 46°49′58″E
- Country: Iran
- Province: Kermanshah
- County: Kermanshah
- Bakhsh: Mahidasht
- Rural District: Mahidasht

Population (2006)
  - Total: 38
- Time zone: UTC+3:30 (IRST)
  - Summer (DST): UTC+4:30 (IRDT)

Ali Bar (Persian: عالي بر, also Romanized as ‘Ālī Bar and ‘Ālībar; also known as Alīvar, Milla Aliwar, and Milleh Aliwar) is a village in Mahidasht Rural District, Mahidasht District, Kermanshah County, Kermanshah Province, Iran. At the 2006 census, its population was 38, in 11 families.
