= Officine Meccaniche Giovanni Cerutti =

Printing press manufacturer

Coordinates: 45°8′46″N 8°26′42″E

Officine Meccaniche Giovanni Cerutti S.p.A.

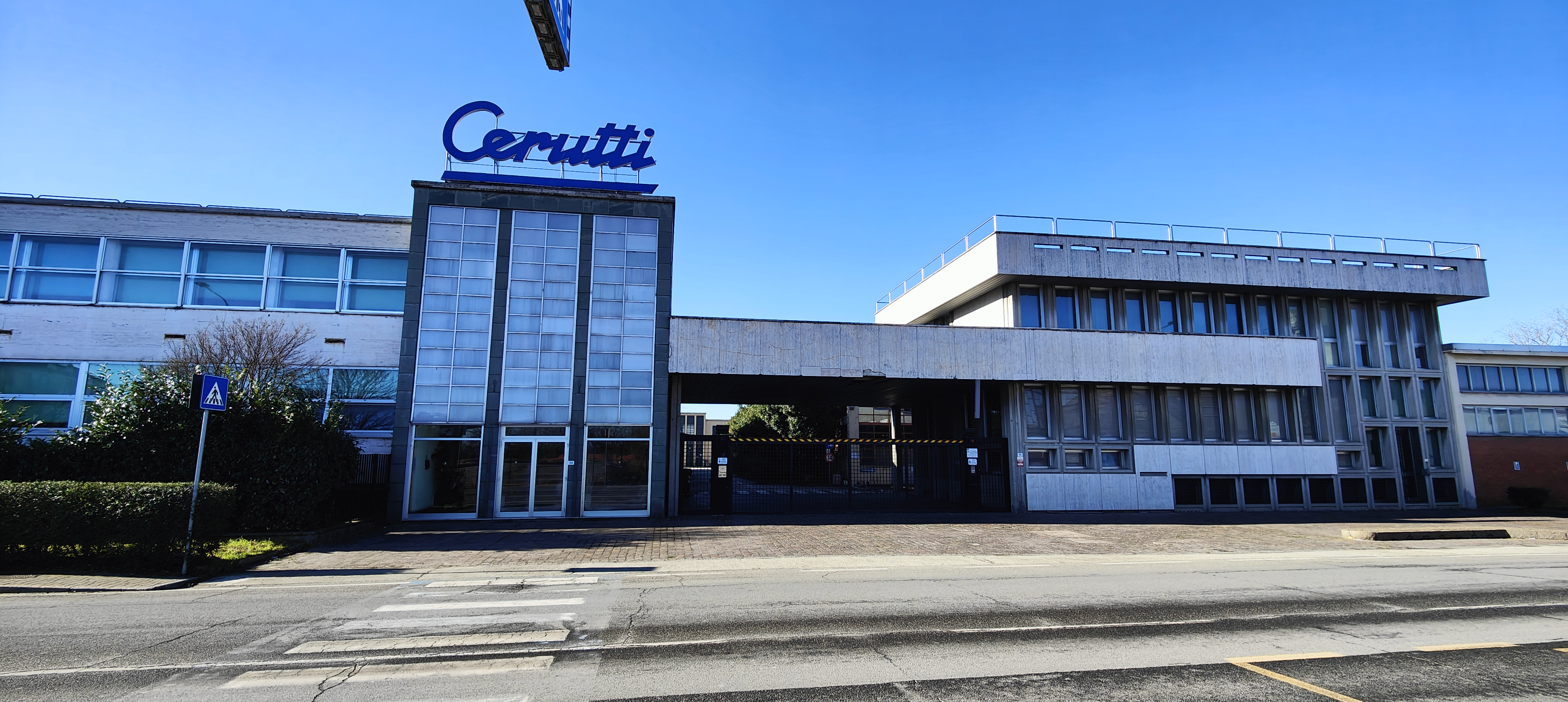
- Company type: Società per azioni
- Industry: Design and manufacture of printing presses for magazines, newspapers and packaging materials
- Founded: Casale Monferrato, Italy (1920)
- Founder: Giuseppe Cerutti
- Headquarters: Casale Monferrato, Italy
- Area served: Worldwide
- Website: www.cerutti.it

Officine Meccaniche Giovanni Cerutti S.p.A. is an Italian joint-stock company headquartered in Casale Monferrato, which designs and manufactures rotogravure and flexo printing presses and related equipment for magazine and newspaper production, and for the printing and converting of packaging materials.

== See also ==
- List of Italian companies
