= PFM Group =

- Company type: Private
- Industry: Industrial Packaging and Weighing
- Founded: 1964
- Founder: Pietro Fioravanti
- Headquarters: Torrebelvicino (Vicenza), Italy
- Area served: Worldwide
- Key people: Elisabetta Fioravanti (Chairperson); Paolo Fioravanti (Managing Director); Andrea Fioravanti (Marketing Manager)
- Products: Packing machinery Packing line machinery Weighing machinery
- Revenue: ▲€ 71 million (2010)
- Number of employees: 340 (2010)
- Subsidiaries: PFM Packaging Machinery UK Ltd; PFM North America; PFM Germany; PFM Russia; PFmeccanica; MBP Multihead Weighers; BG Pack; SPS Italiana Pack Systems
- Website: pfm.it

PFM Group is an Italian multinational company in the packaging and weighing machinery industry, producing Flow Wrap and Form Fill Seal machines, automatic packaging lines and Multihead weighers employed in the food and non-food industries.

== Arrangement of the company ==
PFM Group is made up of nine companies: the Italian parent company, PFM Packaging Machinery, which works alongside the UK PFM LTD, North American PFM Corporation, and German PFM Germany companies. BG Pack SPA, which is based in Bergamo, specialising in the manufacture of special packaging machines for recloseable packs. MBP, based in Mantua, specialise in the production of multi-head weighers and vertical packaging machines thereby completing the range offered by PFM.
Last in order of acquisition is SPS Italiana Pack Systems, which has come back into the hands of those who founded the company after exchanging ownership a number of times; this company from Novara manufacture automatic handling and packaging machines for baked goods and biscuits, chocolate bars and wafers. In 2006 PFmeccanica was founded to form a new production centre for mechanical components. In November 2007 PFM Russia was founded, the new commercial and logistic base for the Eastern European markets.

== History ==
In 1964 Italianapack, which produces horizontal flow packaging machines, is founded by Fioravanti Pietro in Vicenza. Italiana pack is then sold, in 1972, to the American FMC Corporation. After a crisis, the industry starts the production of forced hot air rotary ovens for many years, until 1982 when PFM starts reducing the production of ovens while the flow pack catches on. 1984 sees the arrival of PFM in the United States, thanks to a foreign sales increase for the Europe area in the preceding year.
In 2001 PFM acquires the majority share of the company BG Pack, with the aim to complete its range of vertical and horizontal flow-pack machines for ergonomic and easy-opening packaging, with a particular focus in cheese packaging. The next year PFM obtains the UNI EN ISO 9001-2000 (Vision 2000) certification for the Central Italian headquarters and also acquires the majority share of the company MBP, producers of multi-head and vertical packaging machines, entering the weighing market. In 2003 PFM buy 100% of SPS Packaging System, which is the formerly named Italianapack, sold in 1972 and now rejoining the group.

== Products ==
PFM designs, builds and markets around 40 models of flow-wrapping and vertical form-fill-seal machines together with various automatic feed systems and multihead weighers. Machines are produced for various sectors of the food industry from dairy, which is its most significant sector, to meat, confectionery, bakery goods, fruit and vegetables as well as non-food industries such as pharmaceuticals and cosmetics.

== See also ==
- List of Italian companies
