= Massimo Alba =

Italian businessman

Massimo Alba is an Italian menswear designer and head of his eponymous casual luxury brand, which is entirely made in Italy. The company operates six monobrand stores: Milan, Rome, Courmayeur, Sestri Levante, Forte dei Marmi and Puntaldia.

== In popular culture ==
In No Time To Die, Daniel Craig as James Bond wears Massimo Alba garments in several scenes, including grey corduroy trousers, a desert-brown baby-corduroy suit, and a long corduroy duster coat. Craig had worn the brand as part of his personal wardrobe before choosing to wear Massimo Alba in the film.

== Clientele ==
Tom Cruise, Leonardo DiCaprio, Stanley Tucci, John Malkovich, James Franco, Justin Bieber and Sir Ian McKellen have worn Massimo Alba.

== Collaborations ==
In 2021 Massimo Alba collaborated with Italian luxury leather goods brand Valextra on a redesign of its Serie S bag, which was first launched in 1961.

In 2023 Massimo Alba and Garrett Leight California collaborated on an eyewear capsule collection.

== Personal life ==
Alba lives with his family in Brera, Milan, in a building where Leonardo da Vinci once lived while painting The Last Supper.

== See also ==
- Milan Fashion Week
