= Falc =

Italian footwear company

Falc S.p.A.
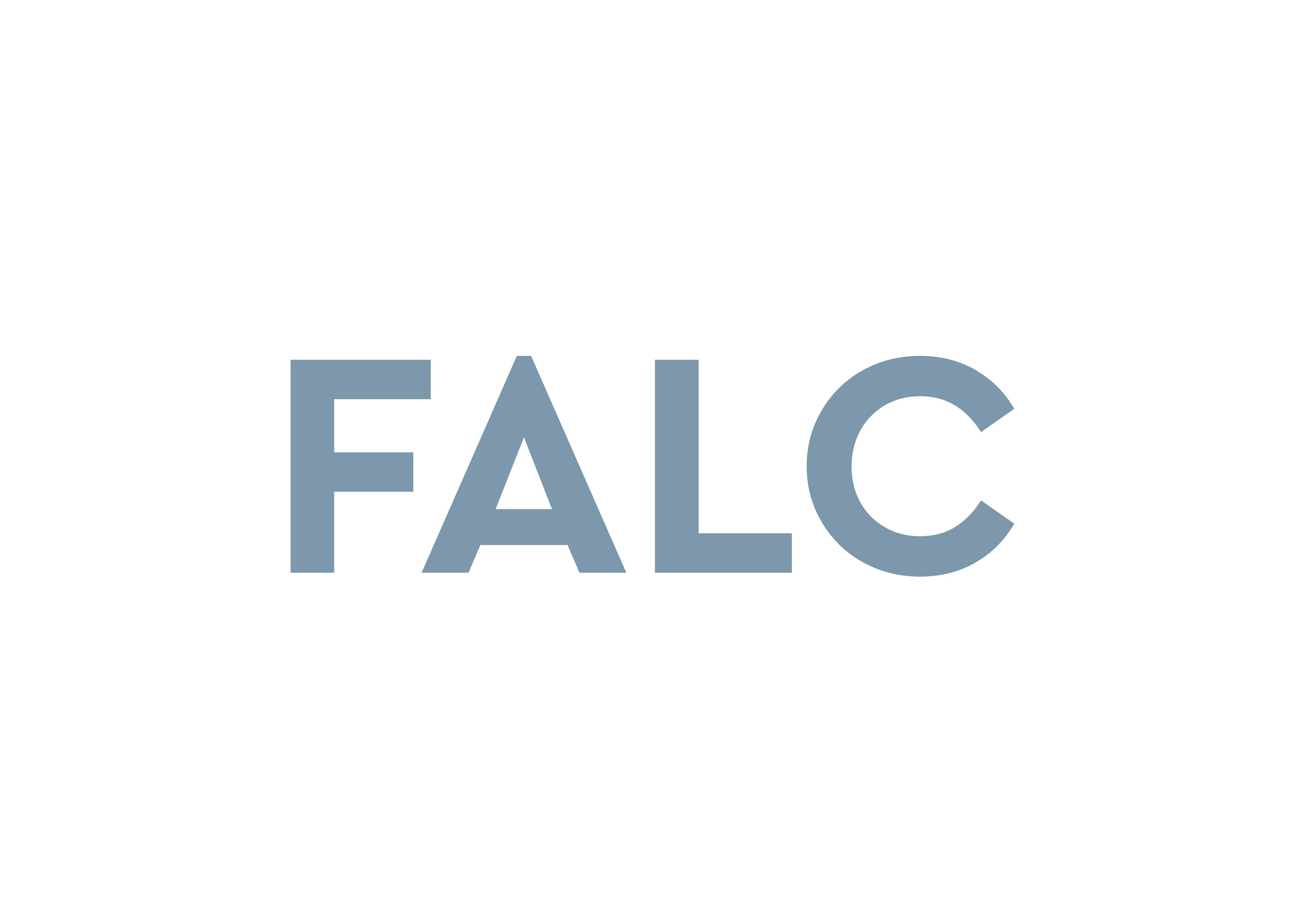
- Industry: Fashion
- Founded: 1974; 52 years ago in Civitanova Marche, Italy
- Products: Shoes
- Website: falc.biz

Falc S.p.A. is an Italian footwear manufacturer founded in Civitanova Marche (MC) in 1974. The name Falc derives from ‘Falchetti’, a historical name by which the inhabitants of the upper part of the town were known.

The Falcotto line of shoes, created for children who crawl and toddlers, was introduced by Falc in 1982. Six years later in 1988, this company of Marche Region launched the Naturino line on the market whose characterising features are the ‘sand effect’ system and a slip-out insole.

In 1989 Falc acquired the Moschino license for children’s footwear.

Falc entered the field of footwear for adults in 2005 when it introduced the Moschino’s Men’s collection and presented the Voile Blanche unisex line.

Today, Falc produces more than 2 million pairs of shoes a year and in recent years the company has opened 5000 sales outlets, 50 exclusive stores, factories in different countries and branch offices in the United States, Canada, Singapore, China, France and Germany.

== See also ==
- Baldinini
- Stefano Bemer
- Bettanin & Venturi
- Bontoni
- Bottega Veneta
- Braccialini
- Brunello Cucinelli
- Calzaturificio fratelli soldini
- Diesel (brand)
- Dolce & Gabbana
- Fendi
- Fiorucci
- Furla
- Garolini
- Genny
- Geox
- Golden Goose
- Gravati
- Gucci
- Iceberg
- Krizia
- Luigi Voltan
- Bruno Magli
- Marina Rinaldi
- Moon Boot
- Cesare Paciotti
- Pal Zileri
- Pinko
- Prada
- Ferragamo
- Sergio Rossi
- Superga
- Tod's
- Valextra
- Versace
- Vibram
- Made in Italy
