= List of works by Philip Johnson =

This list of works by Philip Johnson categorizes the Pritzker Prize-winning architect's work. Johnson was a postmodern architect active in the 20th century. Many of his works were produced in collaboration with John Burgee, and many of his most famous buildings were offices.

== 1943–1980 ==
- Johnson House at Cambridge, "The Ash Street House", Cambridge, Massachusetts (1941)
- Booth (Damora) House, Bedford Village, New York (1946)
- Johnson House, "The Glass House", New Canaan, Connecticut (1949)
- Benjamin V. Wolf House, “The Wolfhouse” Newburgh, New York (1949)
- John de Menil House, Houston, Texas (1950)
- Rockefeller Guest House for Blanchette Ferry Rockefeller, New York City (1950)
- Abby Aldrich Rockefeller Sculpture Garden at The Museum of Modern Art, New York City, New York (1953)
- Seagram Building, New York City, New York (in collaboration with Mies van der Rohe; 1956)
- Reactor Building, Soreq Nuclear Research Center, Israel (1956-1959)
- The Four Seasons Restaurant, New York City, New York (1959)
- Academic Mall at the University of Saint Thomas, Houston, Texas (1959)
- Expansion of St. Anselm's Abbey, Washington, D.C. (1960)
- Museum of Art at Munson-Williams-Proctor Arts Institute, Utica, New York (1960); it was listed on the National Register of Historic Places in 2010.
- Amon Carter Museum of American Art, Fort Worth, Texas (1961; also expansion in 2001)
- Brown University Computing Laboratory, Providence, Rhode Island (1961)
- Sheldon Museum of Art, Lincoln, Nebraska (1963)
- New York State Theater (renamed David H. Koch Theater) at Lincoln Center, New York City, New York (with Richard Foster; 1964)
- New York State Pavilion for the 1964 New York World's Fair, New York City, New York (with Foster; 1964)
- The Beck House (childhood home of Henry C. Beck III ), Dallas, TX (1965)
- Laboratory of Epidemiology and Public Health at Yale University, New Haven, CT (1966)
- Kreeger Museum, Washington, D.C. (with Foster; 1967)
- O. C. Bailey Library, Hendrix College, Conway, AR (1967)
- Elmer Holmes Bobst Library at New York University, New York City, New York (with Foster; 1967–1973)
- Kunsthalle Bielefeld, Bielefeld, Germany (1968)
- WRVA Building, Richmond, Virginia (1968)
- Neuberger Museum of Art at the State University of New York at Purchase, Purchase, New York (1969)
- John Fitzgerald Kennedy Memorial, Dallas, Texas (1970)
- Albert and Vera List Art Building, Brown University, Providence, Rhode Island (1971)
- IDS Center, Minneapolis, Minnesota (1972)
- Art Museum of South Texas, Corpus Christi, Texas (1972)
- Johnson Building at the Boston Public Library, Boston, Massachusetts (1973)
- Fort Worth Water Gardens, Fort Worth, Texas (1974)
- Pennzoil Place, Houston, Texas (1975)
- Dorothy and Dexter Baker Center for the Arts at Muhlenberg College, Allentown, Pennsylvania (1976)
- Thanks-Giving Square, Dallas, Texas (1976)
- Banaven Center, Caracas, Venezuela (1976)
- Century Center (South Bend), South Bend, Indiana (Johnson/Burgee Architects; 1977)
- 101 California Street, San Francisco, California (Johnson/Burgee Architects; 1979–1982)
- Crystal Cathedral, Garden Grove, California (1980)

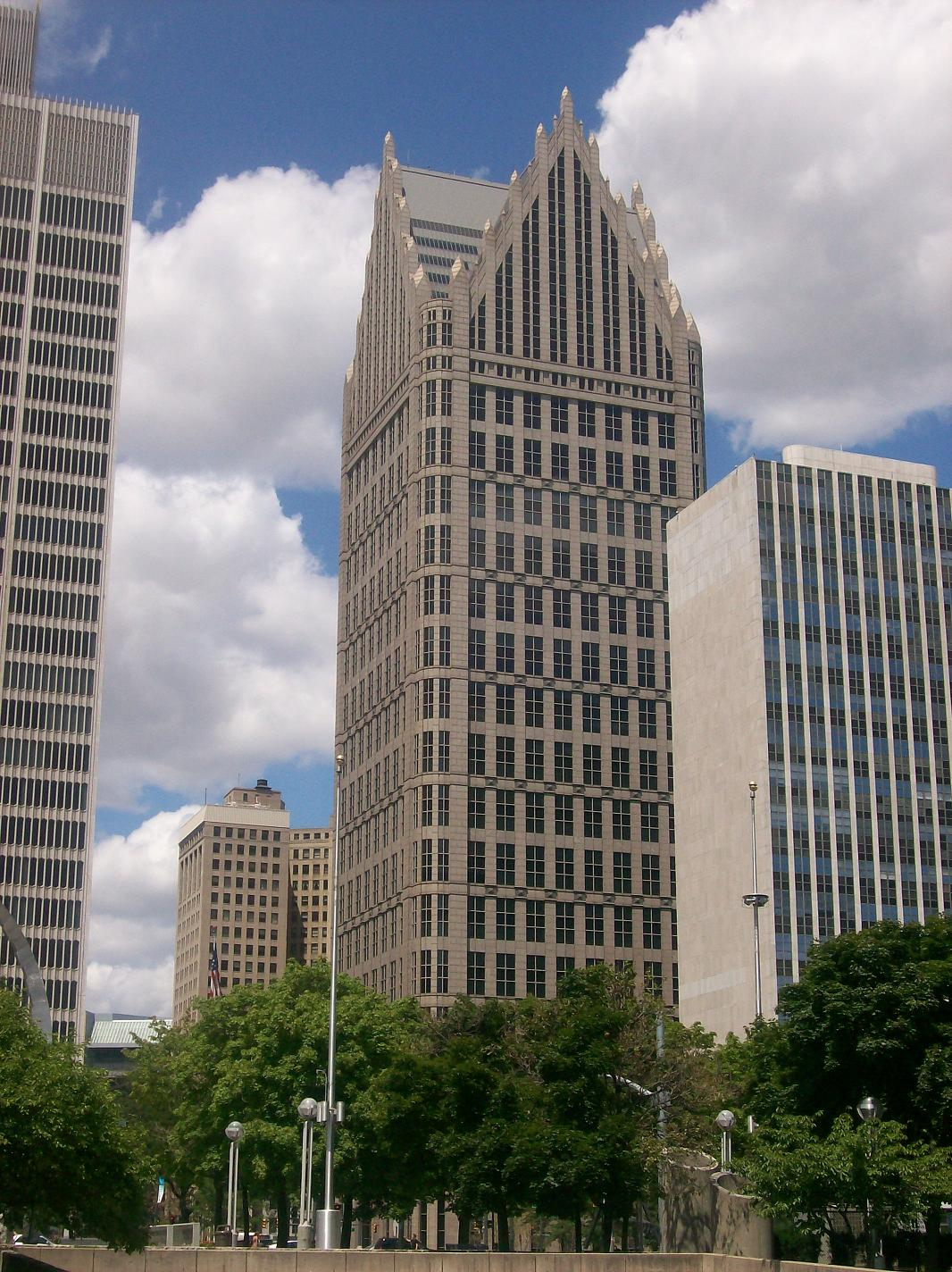
One Detroit Center (1993) from Jefferson Avenue in Detroit.

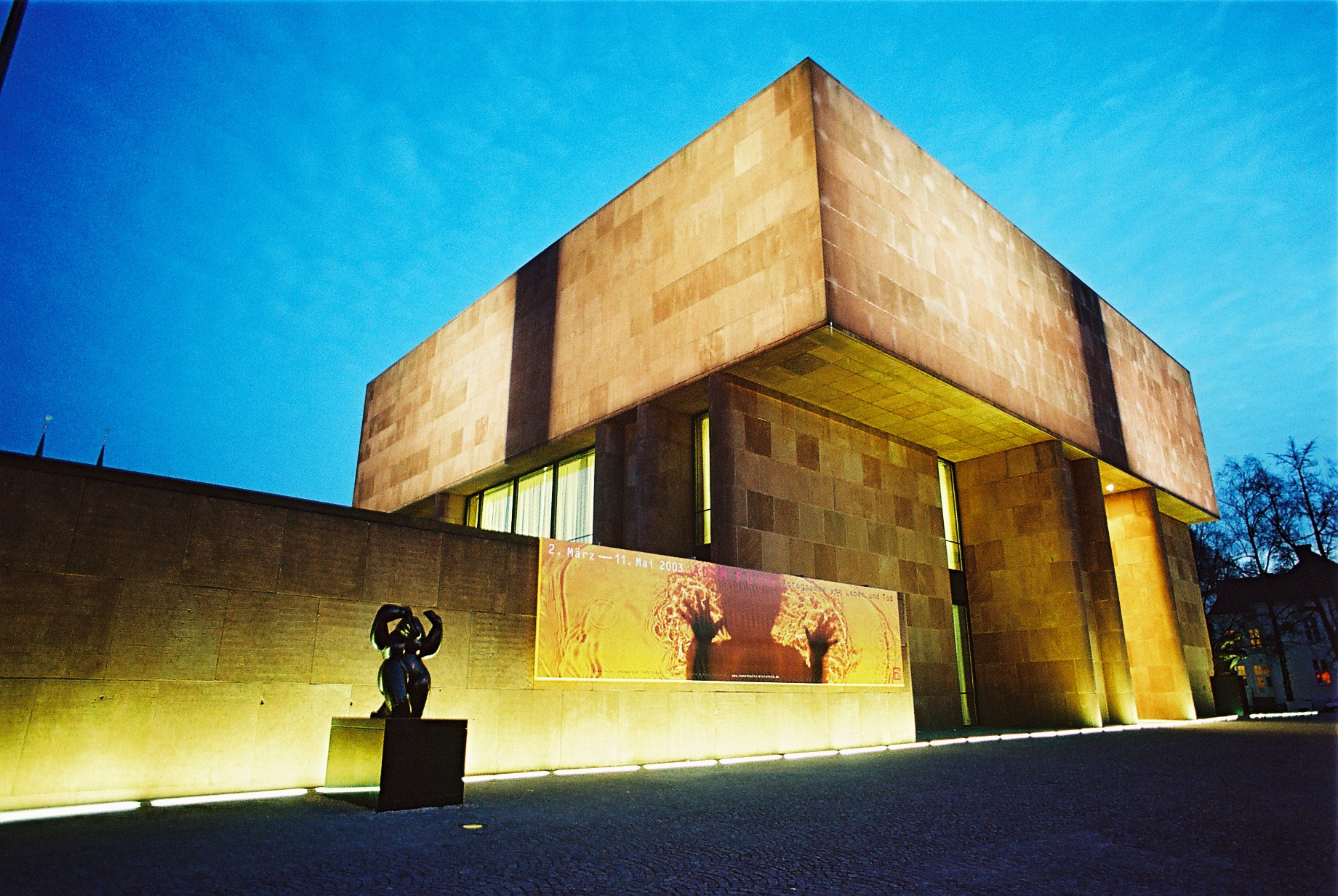
Kunsthalle Bielefeld (1968)

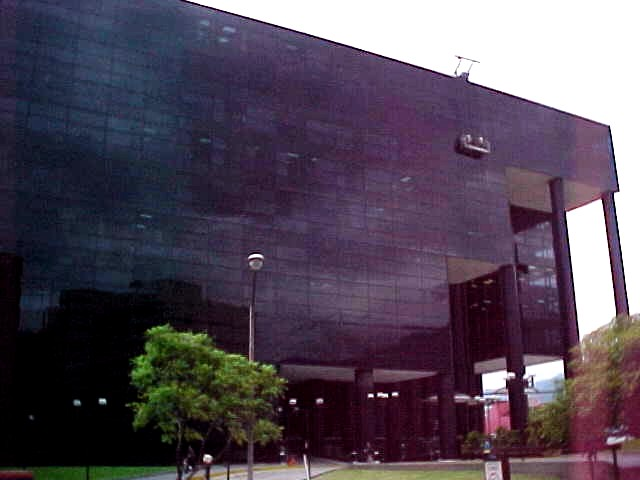
Banaven Center (Black Cube) in Caracas, Venezuela (1975).

== 1981–2010 ==
- National Centre for the Performing Arts complex in Mumbai, India (including the Tata Theatre, Jamshed Bhabha Theatre, and Experimental Theatre (NCPA) (1981-1985)
- Neiman Marcus Department Store, San Francisco, California (1982)
- Metro-Dade Cultural Center, Miami, Florida (1982)
- TC Energy Center (formerly Bank of America Center), Houston, Texas (1983)
- Transco Tower (renamed Williams Tower), Houston, Texas (1983)
- Cleveland Play House, Cleveland, Ohio (extension; 1983) (demolished in 2023)
- Wells Fargo Center, Denver, Colorado (1983)
- PPG Place, Pittsburgh, Pennsylvania (1984)
- 550 Madison Avenue, New York City, New York (1984)
- The Gerald D. Hines College of Architecture, University of Houston, Houston, Texas (1985)
- 580 California Street, San Francisco, California (1985)
- Lipstick Building, New York City, New York (1986)
- The Crescent (Dallas), Dallas, Texas (1986)
- Tycon Center, Fairfax County, Virginia (1986)
- Comerica Bank Tower, Dallas, Texas (1987)
- 190 South LaSalle Street, Chicago, Illinois (John Burgee Architects, Philip Johnson Consultant; 1987)
- One Atlantic Center, Atlanta, Georgia (1987)
- Gate of Europe, Madrid, Spain (John Burgee Architects, Philip Johnson Consultant; 1989–1996)
- 191 Peachtree Tower, Atlanta, Georgia (John Burgee Architects, Philip Johnson Consultant; 1990)
- Paley Center for Media (formerly The Museum of Television & Radio), New York City, New York (1991)
- Chapel of St. Basil on the Academic Mall at the University of St. Thomas, Houston, Texas (with John Manley, Architect; 1992)
- Millenia Walk and The Conrad Centennial Hotel (part of the Millenia Walk Development), Marina Bay, Singapore (with Kevin Roche, and John Burgee 1992)
- The Department of Mathematics at Ohio State University, Columbus, Ohio (1992)
- Science and Engineering Library at Ohio State University, Columbus, Ohio (1992)
- Canadian Broadcasting Centre, Toronto, Canada (Bregman + Hamann Architects, Scott Associates Architects, Barton Myers Associates, John Burgee Architects, Philip Johnson Consultant; 1992)
- AEGON Center, Louisville, Kentucky (John Burgee Architects, Philip Johnson Consultant; 1993)
- One Detroit Center, Detroit, Michigan (John Burgee Architects, Philip Johnson Consultant; 1993)
- Visitor's Pavilion, New Canaan, Connecticut (1994)
- Turning Point at Case Western Reserve University, Cleveland, Ohio (1996)
- Philip-Johnson-Haus, Berlin, Germany (1997)
- First Union Plaza, Boca Raton, Florida (2000)
- Urban Glass House, 330 Spring Street, SoHo, Manhattan, New York City (2005); Interior by Annabelle Selldorf. Completed posthumously in 2006.
- Interfaith Peace Chapel on the Cathedral of Hope campus, Dallas, Texas (2010)
