= Jack Mitchell (author) =

American businessperson, author, and motivational speaker

Jack Mitchell is an American businessperson, author, and motivational speaker. He is the chairman of the Mitchells Family of Stores. In 2005, he was included on Inc. magazine's list of 26 Most Fascinating Entrepreneurs.

== Early life and education ==
Mitchell earned a Bachelor of Arts from Wesleyan University in 1961, and later obtained a master of arts in Chinese history from the University of California, Berkeley, in 1963, planning to become a diplomat in China-United States relations.

== Career ==
The Mitchells Family of Stores was founded in 1958 as "Ed Mitchell's" by Mitchell's parents, Ed and Norma Mitchell. The original Westport, Connecticut, shop had only 800 ft^{2} of space and five men's suit styles. Jack joined the company in 1969. The company acquired Richards of Greenwich, Connecticut in 1995, Marsh's of Long Island, New York, in 2005 (now called Mitchells), Wilkes Bashford of San Francisco and Palo Alto in 2009, and Marios in Seattle and Portland, Oregon, in October 2015. Mitchells Stores acquired Stanley Korshak in 2025.

== Published works ==
- Hug Your Customers: The Proven Way to Personalize Sales and Achieve Astounding Results (2003)
- Hug Your People: The Proven Way to Hire, Inspire, and Recognize Your Employees and Achieve Remarkable Results (2008)
- Selling the 'Hug Your Customers Way': The Proven Process for Becoming a Passionate and Successful Salesperson for Life (2018)
