= Gai Mattiolo =

Italian fashion designer (born 1968)

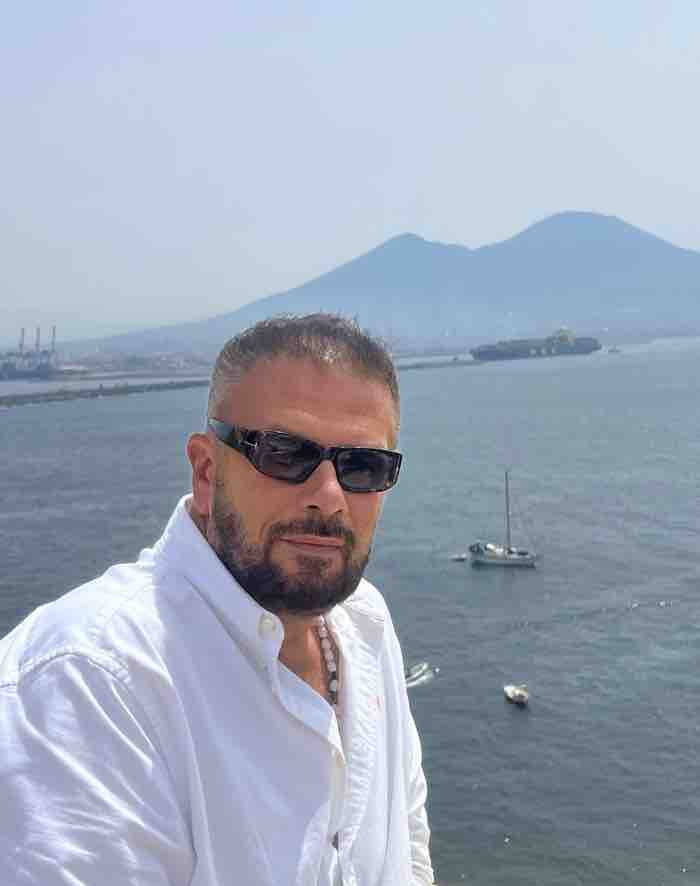
- Born: Gaetano Mattiolo; 23 December 1968 (age 57); Rome, Italy
- Occupation: fashion designer

Gaetano "Gai" Mattiolo (born 23 December 1968) is an Italian fashion designer.

== Biography ==
Mattiolo was born and raised in Rome. After graduating from the liceo scientifico, with funding from his parents, Mattiolo opened his fashion house in 1987 and presented his first ready-to-wear collection at the MODIT event in Milan.

His style is characterized by bright colours and attention to detail, especially buttons, often made of gold or gems, which have become his trademark. He was often referred to as a "new Versace". He dressed many celebrities, including Queen Sofía of Spain, Lauren Bacall, Susan Sarandon, Halle Berry, Cher, Ivana Trump, Mariah Carey, Ursula Andress, Sharon Stone and Raffaella Carrà. In 2000, he designed four chasubles for Pope John Paul II.

Over the years, his business included the limited edition Gai Mattiolo Royale line, Schoking Gai for larger sizes, Gai Mattiolo Couture Textiles, and footwear, accessories and perfume lines. His artistic collaborator was his partner, Attilio Vaccari. Gai Mattiolo Couture was produced by the Mariella Burani Fashion Group, and jeans by the Emilian Group. In 2003, Mattiolo's company, which is managed by his sister Giada, reacquired all licenses but, in 2004, production of men's shoes was licensed to Rodolfo Zengarini and scarves to the Achille Pinto company.

Mattiolo did not present new collections in 2006 and 2007 and began to close stores. By 2008, he was seeking financing. In December 2008, after allegedly transferring £1.8m to a bank account in Luxembourg, he was charged with fraudulent bankruptcy and embezzlement, as were his former lawyer and six other company directors and administrators. In 2015, all parties were acquitted of all charges.

In 2011, Mattiolo launched Gai Mattiolo Wedding. His most recent collection was released in 2020.
