= Bontoni =

Italian shoemaker

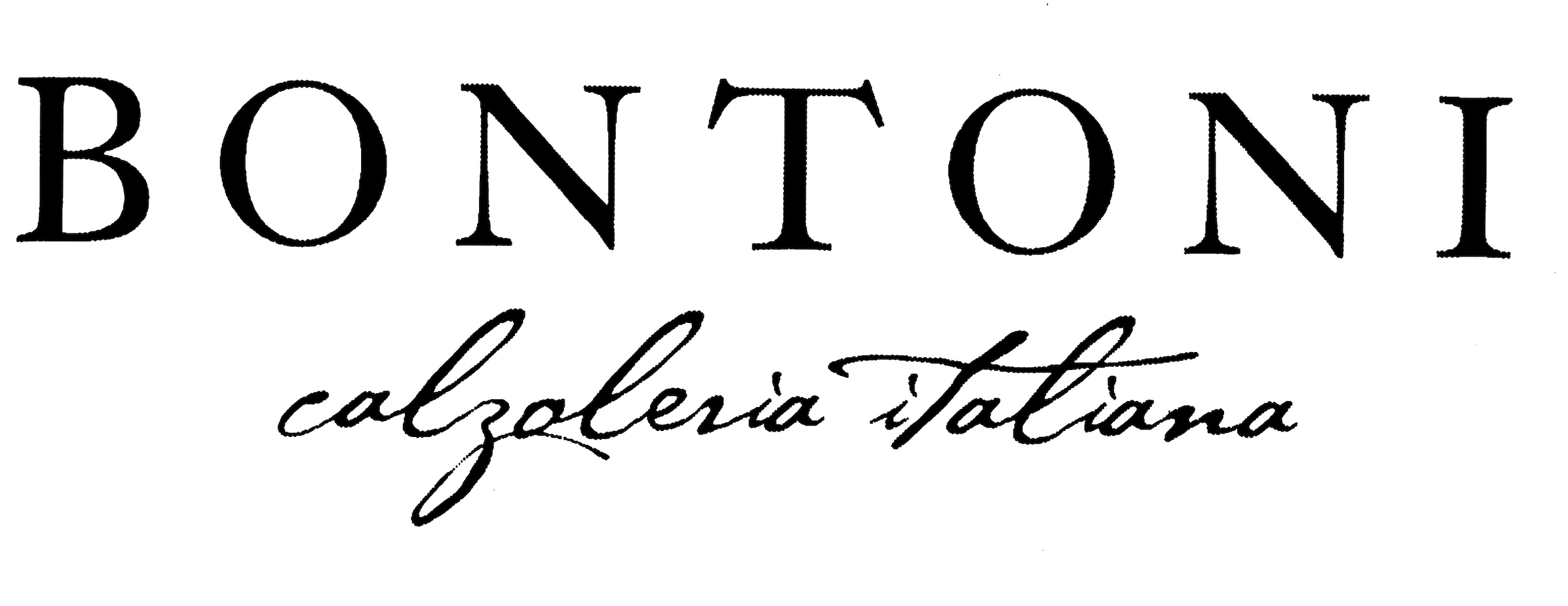

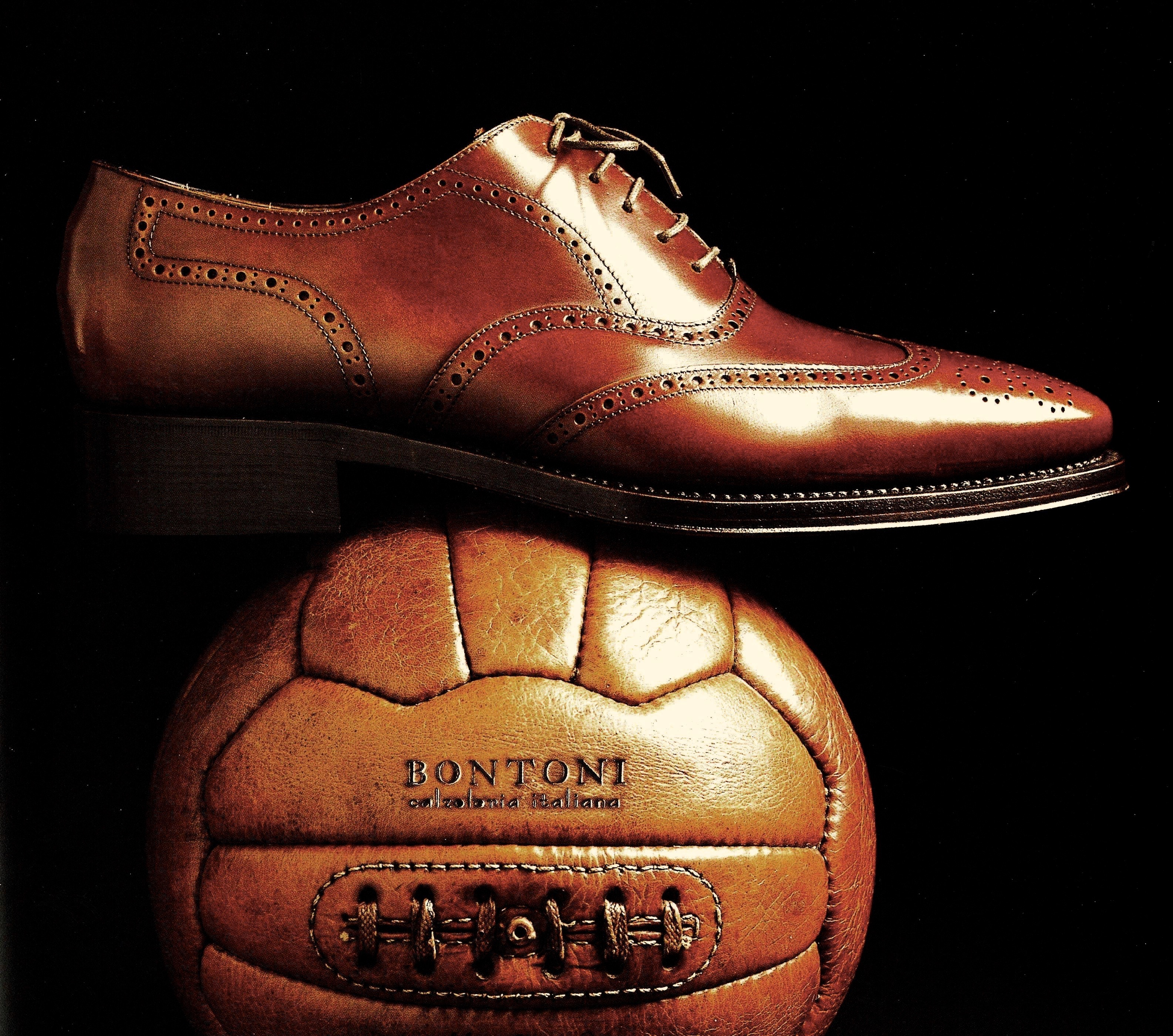
- Type: Private
- Industry: Footwear
- Founded: 2004; 22 years ago
- Headquarters: Sant'Elpidio a Mare, Italy
- Products: Shoes and Belts
- Website: www.bontoni.com

Bontoni is a luxury Italian shoemaker that makes handmade men's dress shoes. Bontoni's nine-person workshop is located on the outskirts of Montegranaro in the Marche Region of Italy.

== Background ==
Bontoni is a third-generation luxury Italian shoemaker that manufactures handmade men's shoes. Bontoni was founded in 2004 by Franco Gazzani (third-generation family shoemaker) and his distant cousin Lewis Cutillo. Prior to 2004, Gazzani's grandfather, uncle, and father made custom shoes for a limited number of clients under no label. Many of the models carried by the brand were originally created by Gazzani's father and grandfather. The name Bontoni originated from the French bon ton, which means sophisticated manner.

Bontoni's nine artisans produce just 3,800 pairs a year. From start to finish, each pair of Bontoni shoes takes about 14 weeks to complete and nearly 26 working hours. Bontoni's Casa e Bottega, or home-based workshop, is located in Gazzani's basement in Marche, Italy. Bontoni is one of the last remaining established, in-home family-owned artisanal workshops in all of Italy.

== Overview ==
Bontoni is known for its use of hand-colored leathers, distinctive original designs, and meticulous artisanal craftsmanship. Its bespoke (su misura) service includes two to three personalized fittings and typically requires seven to ten months to complete.

Bontoni’s ready-to-wear collection is available through a limited number of high-end retailers worldwide, including: Bergdorf Goodman, Harrods, Wilkes Bashford, Beymen, Richard's, Mario's, Boyds, Stanley Korshak, Harry Rosen, and several others.

== See also ==
- List of Italian companies
