= Baldinini =

Italian footwear company

- Type: Limited liability company
- Industry: Footwear
- Founded: 1910; 116 years ago San Mauro Pascoli, Italy
- Headquarters: San Mauro Pascoli
- Key people: Gimmi Baldinini, President
- Products: Footwear and Accessories
- Revenue: €50 million (2006)
- Number of employees: about 300
- Parent: Mariella Burani Fashion Group
- Website: www.baldinini-shop.com

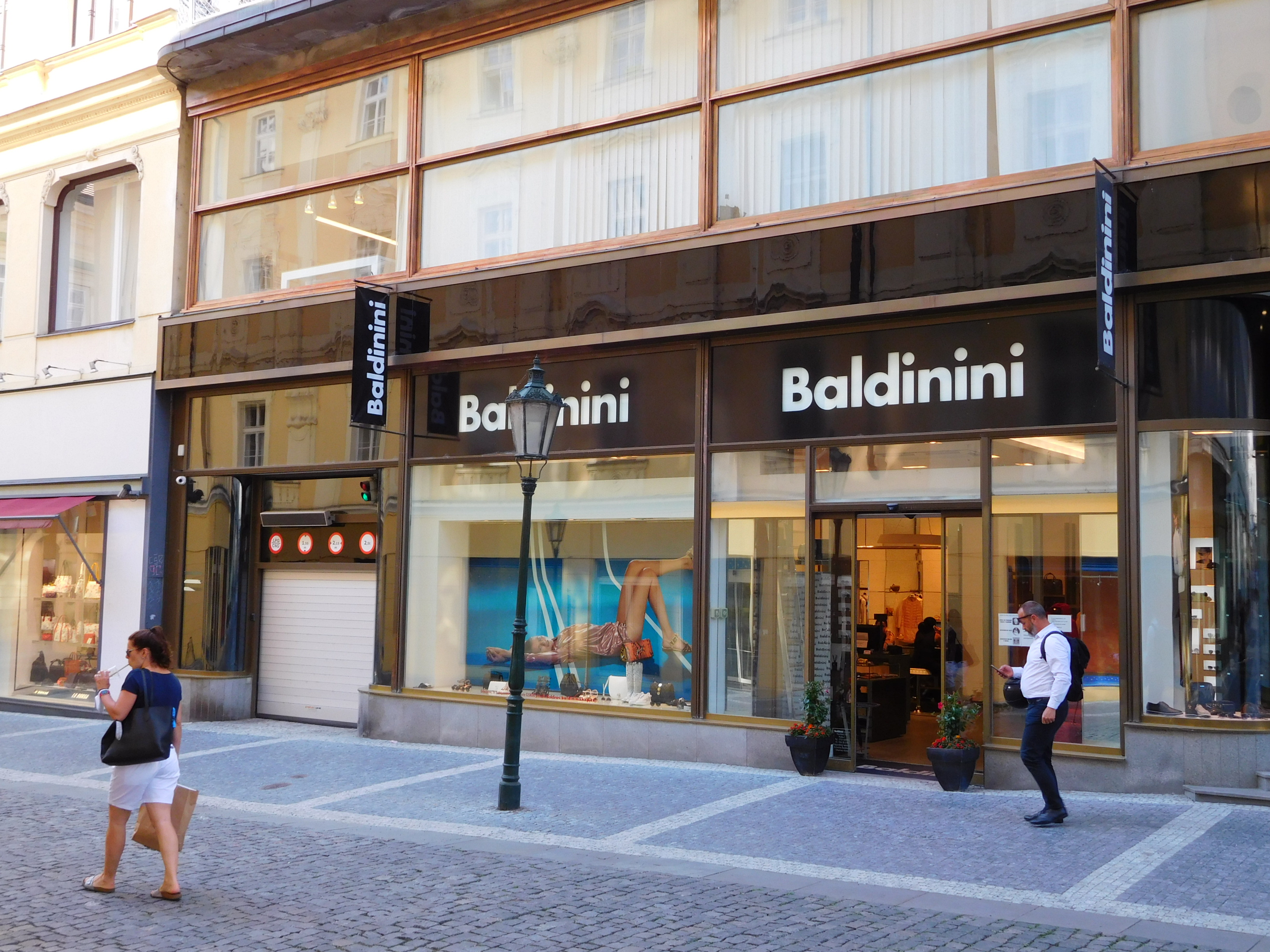
Baldinini store in Prague.

Baldinini is an Italy-based brand specialising in luxury shoes in the manufacturing district of Rubicone province of Forlì-Cesena, Italy.

== History ==
The company began in 1910, in the town of San Mauro Pascoli, which is recognised around the world for its high-quality footwear companies. In the 1970s, Gimmi Baldinini entered the company. The company has 100 Baldinini stores around the world and employs 250 workers.

In 2001, the group MBFG through its subsidiary Antichi Pellettieri acquired 50% of the company.

In 2007, the company signed with Facco Corporation a contract for the production and commercial distribution of branded jewelry Baldinini.

In 2009, on the occasion of the 120th anniversary of the Eiffel Tower, Baldinini created a feminine sandal that follows the design of Parisian architecture, with a golden platform cage and a vertiginous spire heel, covered in black silk velvet.

In 2015, Baldinini and Mafrat together signed a line dedicated to clothing for children aged 3 to 16 under the supervision of Brand Connection S.r.l., called "Baldinini Young".

In 2016, Baldinini signs a contract with the Visconti maison of Florence for the creation of a collection of pens signed by Baldinini.

== Archive ==
The company archive consists of about 3000 pairs of shoes. In collaboration with the University of Bologna, Gimmi Baldinini plans to transform his company assets into a business museum.

== See also ==
- Stefano Bemer
- Bettanin & Venturi

== Bibliography ==
- Silvia Martinenghi Baldinini Le scarpe a modo mio – Shoes my way Artestampa
- Andrea Guolo; Massimo Donda (2008). FrancoAngeli (ed.). I passi del successo. Storie di imprese e (soprattutto di uomini d'impresa. Con 15 casi di aziende che hanno fatto la storia delle scarpe in Italia (1^{a} edizione ed.). ISBN 9788846490810.
