= Gravati =

- Company type: Family owned business
- Industry: Fashion
- Founded: 1909; 116 years ago Milan, Italy
- Headquarters: Vigevano, Italy
- Products: Shoes
- Website: gravati.it

Gravati is a family-owned company founded in Milan, Italy in 1909. It manufactures men's and women's dress shoes in Vigevano, Italy. Although Gravati uses a variety of shoe construction methods, including Bologna and Goodyear construction, the majority of their production uses the Blake construction method. The shoes are hand-crafted entirely within the factory by artisans and technicians. Each pattern of each shoe is hand-cut. Gravati does not maintain stock—retailers must specify the patterns, lasts, leathers, soles, and construction methods that they want; only then will the factory make the shoes. Their production methods are typical of many traditional shoemakers in that the uppers are cut (or clicked), lasted and finished by hand, however all sewing is done by machine.

Gravati's American retailers include Stanley Korshak, Davide Cenci and Wilkes Bashford.

== See also ==
- List of Italian companies
