= Jermikko =

American Fashion Designer

- Born: Jermikko Shoshanna Taliaferro Johnson; July 22, 1946 (age 79); Chicago, Illinois, United States
- Occupations: Fashion designer, businessperson
- Years active: 1972–present

Jermikko (born July 22, 1946) is an American fashion designer and businessperson based in Chicago. She was the first African-American woman to own a store in Chicago's upscale Magnificent Mile.

== Early life and career ==
Jermikko was born as Jermikko Shoshanna Johnson in Chicago in 1946. She began making clothes as a teenager, altering and redesigning family members' outfits. In 1972, after graduating with a BFA from the School of the Art Institute of Chicago, she apprenticed under designer Stanley Korshak in Chicago. In 1979, she opened her own fashion business. She has designed pieces for Spike Lee's 2015 film Chi-Raq and Empire. In 2016, her hoodie design appeared in Beyonce's "Pray You Catch Me" video. Jermikko is the executive director of Design and CEO of the Jermikko and JJ Hobeau labels.

== Awards and honors ==
- 1997 Designer of the Year Award from the Apparel Industry Board
- 1999 Manufacturer of the Millennium Award
