= Haydon Art Club =

Art club in Nebraska, 1888 to 1900

The Haydon Art Club was founded in 1888 by Sara W. Moore. It was named after the British history painter, Benjamin Robert Haydon. The goals of the club was promotion of community within art clubs in and out of schools. It was the forerunner of the Nebraska Art Association.

== Early life ==
It began in Miss Moore's home and consisted of herself, Dr. Horton, Mr. Henry Lewis, Dr. H.B. Lower, Mrs. A. P. Stuart, Mr. N.S. Harwood, Miss Sarah Harris, and Frank M. Hall.

The membership fee was $1. Mr. Harwood was the only president the club had during its twelve years of existence

== Career ==
Held eight annual exhibitions over the years.

After Cora Parker who was the head of the club in 1897 left, the university at the time was instituting an Art Department and in 1900 the club was expanded into the Nebraska Art Association.

In 2008 the Nebraska Art Association became the Sheldon Art Association, an association of the Sheldon Museum.

The connection between the Nebraska Art Association and the University of Nebraska Lincoln has survived since.

== Recognition ==
The club's first exhibition in 1888 of a single large painting found success and set a precedent for permanent exhibit spaces for other purchases within the University of Nebraska's art department. A relationship between the association and the university was sustained while exhibitions continued in the University Library Building, Morrill Hall, and finally in the Sheldon Gallery. The continuous efforts toward building an art scene by the artists in Lincoln led to the creation of art collections. A notable one was Mr. and Mrs. Frank M. Hall's which in 1928 was given to the university.
