= Urban Glass House =

Residential building in Manhattan, New York

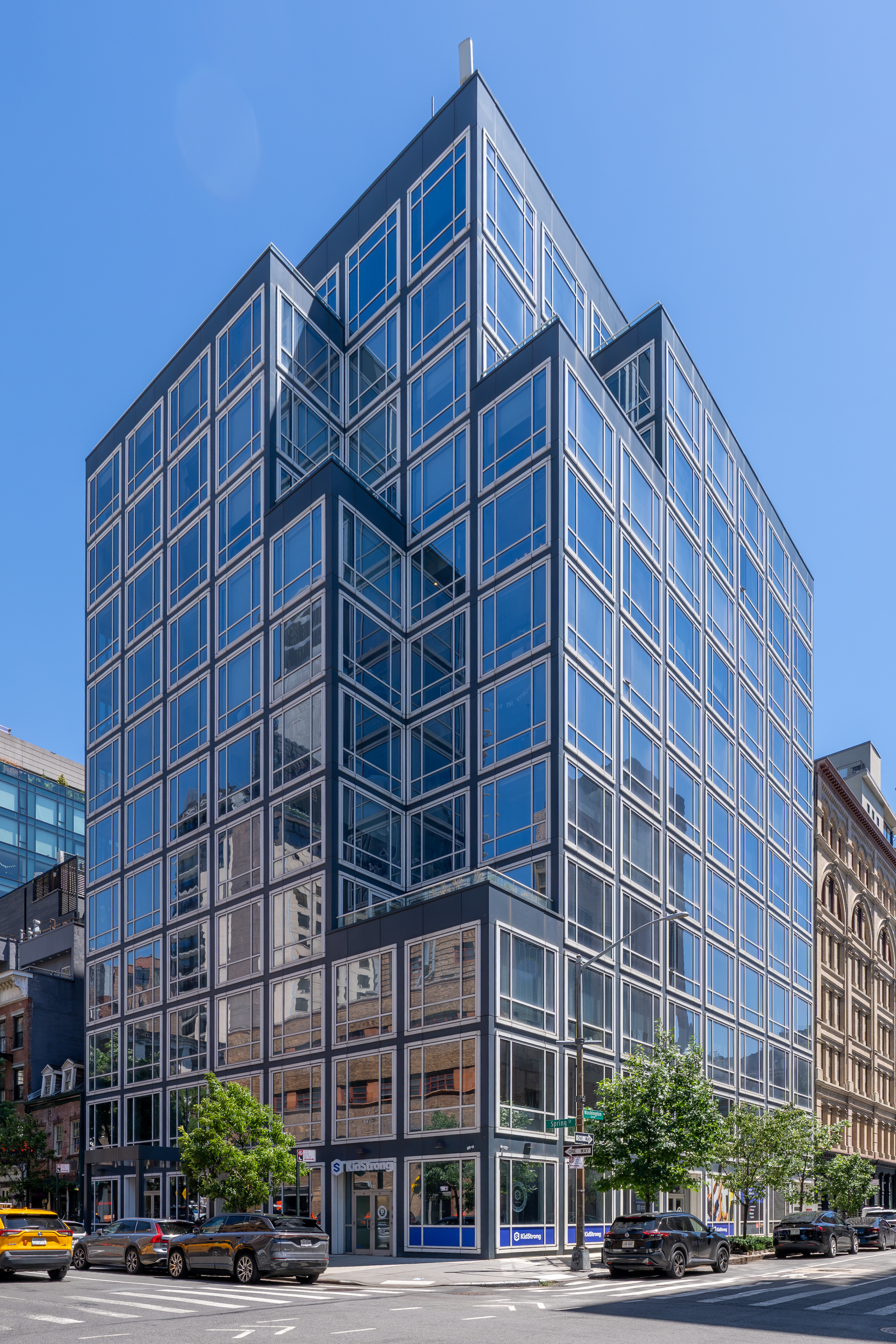
- Philip Johnson's Urban Glass House
- Interactive map of the Urban Glass House area

General information
- Type: Mixed use
- Architectural style: Modern
- Location: 330 Spring Street; Manhattan; New York City, United States
- Coordinates: 40.725768°N 74.009676°W
- Construction started: 2005
- Completed: 2006

Height
- Height: 137 feet (42 m)

Technical details
- Floor count: 12

Design and construction
- Architects: Philip Johnson; SLCE Architects

Urban Glass House is a condominium building designed by American architect Philip Johnson in the Hudson Square neighborhood of Manhattan in New York City. Completed in 2006, it was Johnson's final project, as he did not live to see construction finished. The building's name is a reference to Johnson's earlier Glass House, located in New Canaan, Connecticut, although the urban building bears little resemblance to the original. The interiors were designed by Annabelle Selldorf, an American designer and architect.

The building saw a downturn in sales after the construction of a New York City Department of Sanitation garage across the street was announced in 2007.

== Development ==
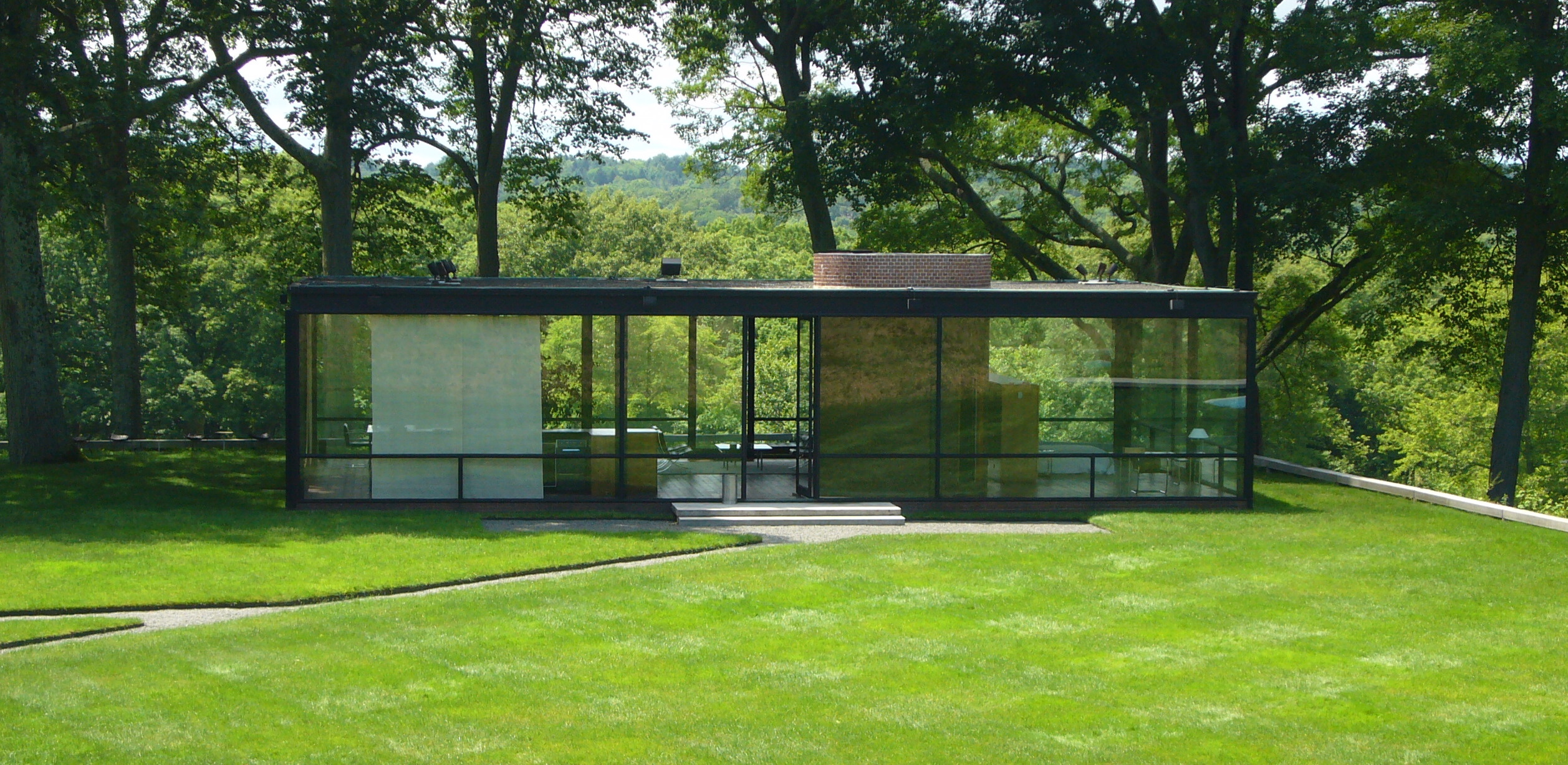
The original Glass House

The building was initially to be developed by restaurateur and developer Antonio Vendome. Vendome commissioned Johnson to create a building of multi-colored bricks which, unlike the current design, eschewed right angles and was asymmetrical, atypical for Johnson. This plan was referred to as a "living sculpture". The original plans also called for a significantly taller building, at twenty stories high. Due to zoning restrictions, this plan was abandoned. During development, Vendome withdrew from the project, selling his stake to three other developers: Charles Blaichman, Scott Sabbagh, and Abram Shnay. The three asked Johnson to draw from his past designs, including the Seagram Building, to inform the plans for the structure. After Alan Ritchie, Johnson's architectural partner, suggested an homage to Johnson's original Glass House, plans were changed to reflect that idea. After the redesign, SLCE Architects was brought in to refine and complete the structure due to Johnson's impending retirement, and, ultimately, his death.

Annabel Selldorf, responsible for the building's interiors, also drew inspiration from the original Glass House. She incorporated, for example, herringbone floors similar to those in the Johnson house, albeit made of white oak, rather than brick.

=== Sanitation Department controversy ===
Not long after the building began sales, the New York City Department of Sanitation announced the construction of a truck garage across the street, at 353 Spring, which sparked controversy and a downturn in sales. The space was originally occupied by a UPS lot and a smaller Department of Sanitation building. During development, purchasers were made aware that a high rise or a garage could someday occupy the space. The new structure drew ire due to worries that it would obscure views of the Hudson River for many of the residences in the building.

Efforts to prevent the structure's construction failed, despite support from celebrities including James Gandolfini, Lou Reed, John Slattery, and Michael Stipe. A garage designed by Dattner Architects was eventually erected on the site; later, a salt storage shed, also designed by Dattner, was built as well. The two new structures, after completion, received with praise as "[one] of the best examples of new public architecture in the city" and "a boon to the neighborhood".

== Usage and residents ==
The building is primarily residential, with forty apartments. Amenities include bicycle storage and an in house fitness facility. There is also ground level retail and a restaurant, which belongs to Antonio Vendome, the original developer of the property.

Marina Abramović lived in the building until 2014. Sol Kerzner has also owned a residence in the building.

== See also ==
- Architecture of New York City
- List of works by Philip Johnson
