= Sheldon Museum of Art =

Art museum at the University of Nebraska–Lincoln

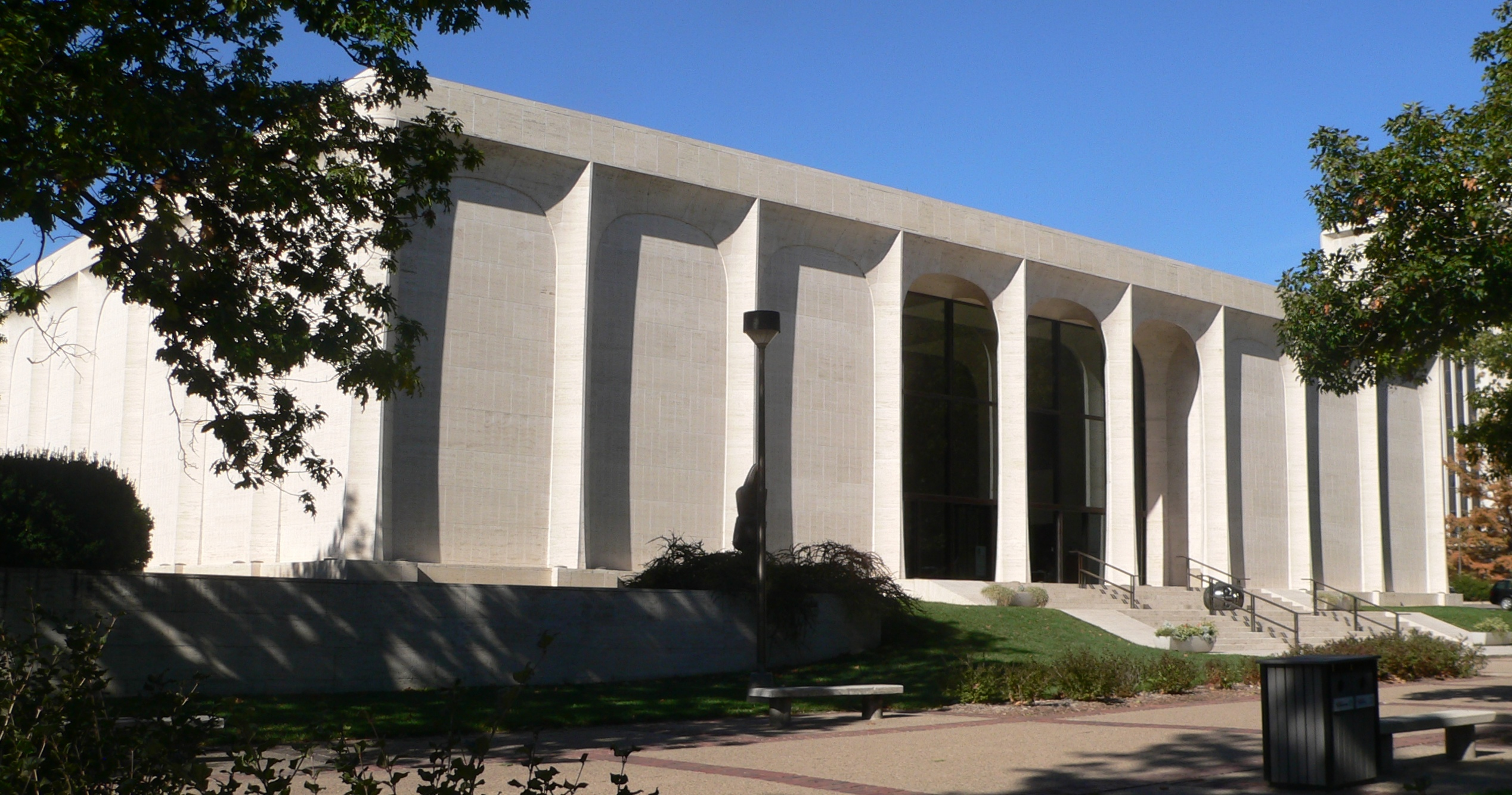
- Interactive fullscreen map
- Former name: Sheldon Memorial Art Gallery
- Established: May 16, 1963; 63 years ago
- Location: 451 North 12th Street; Lincoln, Nebraska; United States
- Coordinates: 40°49′03″N 96°42′16″W
- Type: Art museum
- Collection size: 13,000 works
- Director: Susan Longhenry
- Curator: Magdalena Moskalewicz
- Architect: Philip Johnson
- Sheldon Museum of Art
- U.S. National Register of Historic Places
- Location within Nebraska Location within the United States
- Built: 1963
- Architectural style: Modern
- NRHP reference No.: 13000676
- Added to NRHP: September 3, 2013

The Sheldon Museum of Art (formerly the Sheldon Memorial Art Gallery) is an art museum on the campus of the University of Nebraska–Lincoln in Lincoln, Nebraska. The museum was established in 1963 when the university's art collection was moved to dedicated building at 451 North 12th Street. The building, designed by architect Philip Johnson and funded by siblings Mary Frances and Adams Bromley Sheldon, is made of Italian travertine, featuring a grand hall and distinctive central staircase.

The museum focuses on nineteenth- and twentieth-century art and houses over 12,000 artworks spanning multiple American art movements. An outdoor sculpture garden features more than thirty large-scale works. It was added to the National Register of Historic Places in 2013.

== History ==
In 1888, the Sheldon Art Association was founded as the Haydon Art Club in honor of British painter Benjamin Robert Haydon. The club held an annual art exhibit and supplied art education to the university. It was incorporated as the Nebraska Art Association in the early 1900s.

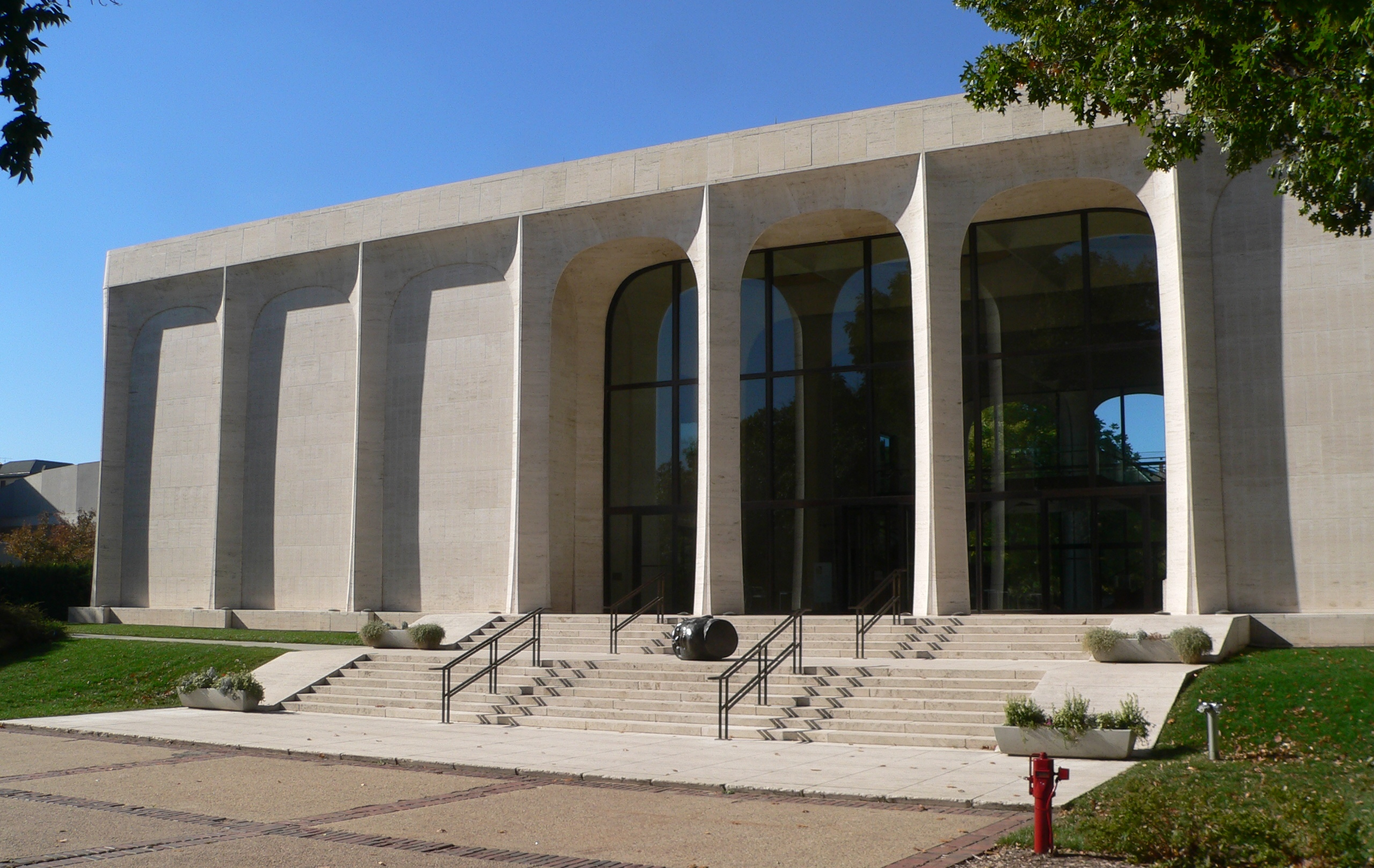
The main entrance of the museum in 2013

For decades, the Nebraska Art Association exhibited its collection in buildings around the university, most notably Morrill Hall. A dedicated building was completed in 1963 at the junction of 12th and R Streets on the southwest edge of the University of Nebraska's City Campus. The building, constructed of Italian travertine, includes an ornate great hall and a suspended grand staircase. Japanese-American sculptor Isamu Noguchi was invited to create and install a work in the grand hall, which he titled "Song of the Bird," as part of the building's opening ceremonies.

Architect Philip Johnson proclaimed the Sheldon the best building he ever designed: "today the museum building stands as a community like the church courthouse of the last century. The architect must therefore create, inside and out, a symbolic structure which the community can refer to with some pride... The symbolic function of the Sheldon Gallery is fulfilled, I feel, not only the 'classical' exterior of travertine but mainly by the great hall which orients the visitor, as well as elevating his spirits." The building was designed to avoid what Johnson called "museum fatigue," a state of physical or mental exhaustion common among museum patrons.

The museum was established as the Sheldon Memorial Art Gallery in honor of donors Mary and Adams Sheldon, who both died during construction. The siblings funded the entire project, combining to give over $1.5 million.

The museum became the Sheldon Museum of Art in 2008, the same year its supporting organization was renamed the Sheldon Art Association. It was added to the National Register of Historic Places in September 2013.

=== Leadership ===
Norman Geske became the first director of the museum in 1956. He is credited with establishing the Sheldon's modern art collection and several other cultural programs, including the Interstate 80 Bicentennial Sculpture Project, the Museum of Nebraska Art in Kearney, and the Sheldon Film Theater (now the Mary Riepma Ross Media Arts Center).

- 1956–1983: Norman Geske
- 1983–1999: George Neubert
- 2001–2008: Janice Driesbach
- 2008–2014: Jorge Daniel Veneciano
- 2014–2023: Wally Mason
- 2023–present: Susan Longhenry

In February 2025, the museum appointed Magdalena Moskalewicz as the Chief Curator and Associate Director for Curatorial Affairs and Randy Guthmiller as Associate Director for Learning, Engagement and Public Practice.

== Collections ==
The Sheldon houses the combined collections of the Sheldon Art Association (founded in 1888 as the Haydon Art Club) and the University of Nebraska–Lincoln (founded in 1929 as the University of Nebraska Art Galleries), totaling over 12,000 works of art in all media. This comprehensive collection of American art includes prominent holdings of nineteenth-century landscape and still life, American Impressionism, early modernism, geometric abstraction, abstract expressionism, pop art, lyrical abstraction, color field painting, minimalism and contemporary art.

In April 1965, "Golden Age," a painting by Benjamin West was stolen by a university student and later recovered by the Federal Bureau of Investigation.

=== Sculpture garden ===
The museum's sculpture garden, opened in 1970, contains more than thirty monumental sculptures. Among them are works by Gaston Lachaise, Jacques Lipchitz, Claes Oldenburg and Coosje van Bruggen, David Smith, Lyman Kipp, William G. Tucker, Bryan Hunt, Mark di Suvero, Michael Heizer, and Richard Serra. The garden's first installations were sometimes controversial – a woman once called to complain, "I think Norman Geske should be fired, and what's more, he should be asked to leave the state because of all the junk he's introduced into the sunken garden south of the gallery.

In 1998, Man in the Open Air, a 1915 bronze sculpture by Elie Nadelman, was stolen from the sculpture garden. Police speculated it was taken during postgame revelry following Nebraska's victory in the 1998 Orange Bowl. About a week later, it was recovered on the university's East Campus. Gallery director George Neubert hypothesized the thief or thieves were unaware of the work's estimated valuation of $500,000, and after learning this, placed it where it would be discovered by security guards. Following $15,000 of restoration and repair, the sculpture was returned to display inside the building.

=== Exhibitions ===
The Sheldon conducts approximately twenty exhibitions per year, focusing on American art in all media and typically including educational programs such as lectures, children's workshops, and tours. Curatorial staff organizes exhibitions drawn from the permanent collection, many of which circulate nationally. The program includes exhibitions organized by peer institutions throughout the United States.

== Gallery ==
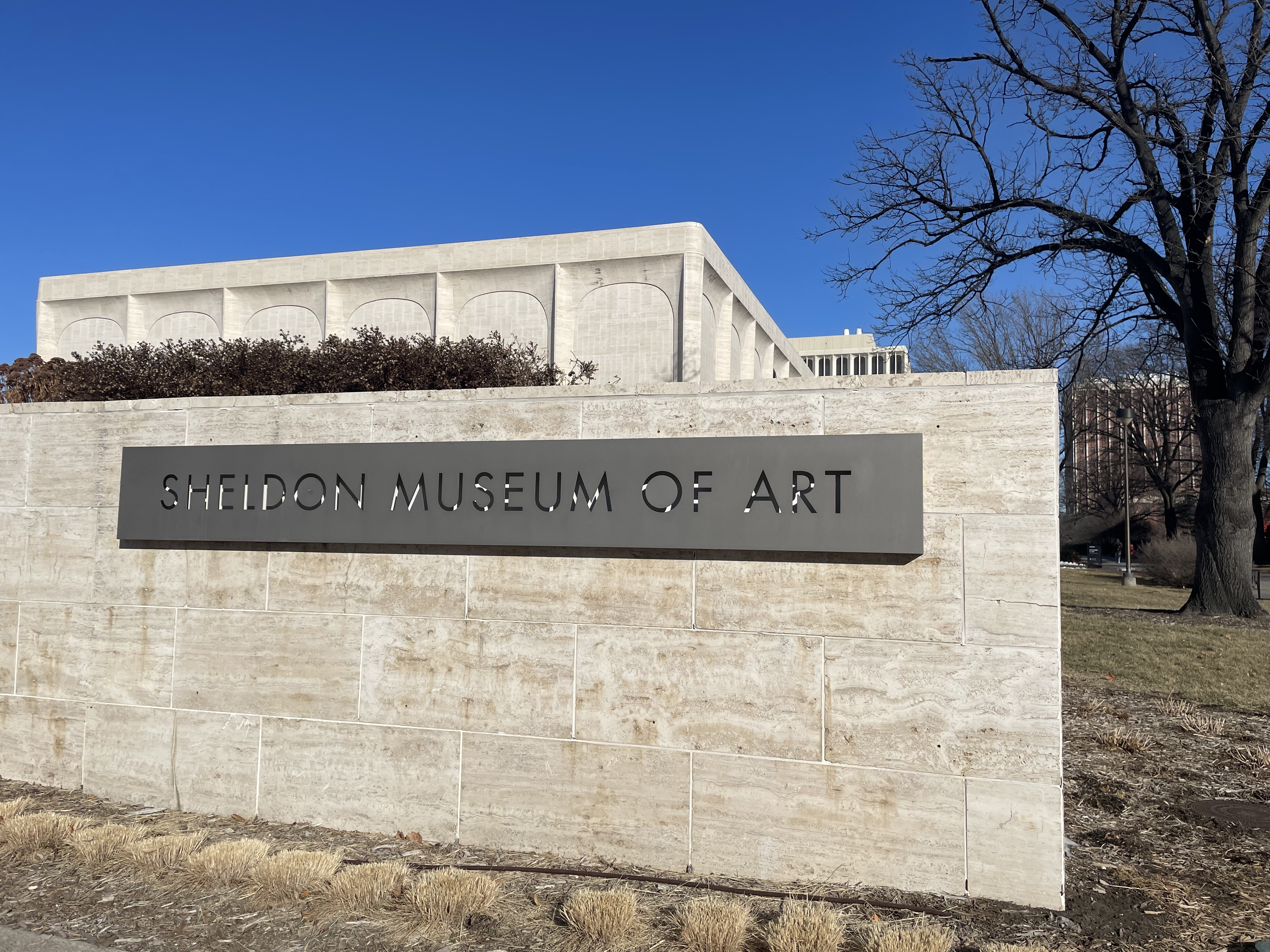
Museum sign as seen from R Street

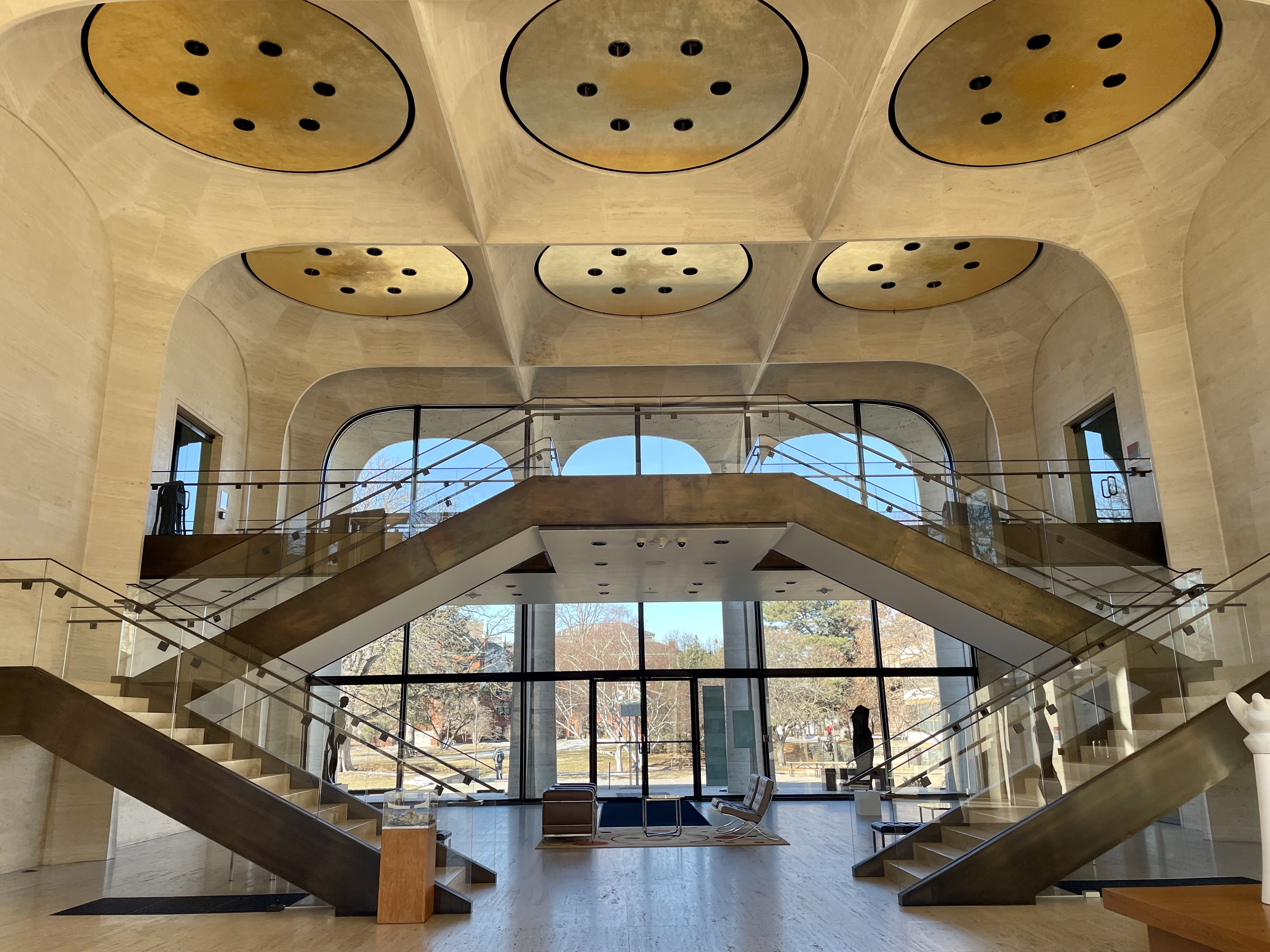
The grand hall of the museum

== See also ==
- List of museums in Nebraska
- List of works by Philip Johnson
- National Register of Historic Places listings in Lancaster County, Nebraska
