= Mitchells Stores =

American luxury clothing retailer

- Type: Private
- Industry: Retail
- Founded: 1958
- Founder: Ed Mitchell; Norma Mitchell
- Headquarters: Westport, Connecticut, U.S.
- Key people: Bob Mitchell (Co-CEO); Russ Mitchell (Co-CEO)
- Products: Luxury clothing and accessories
- Brands: Mitchells; Richards; Wilkes Bashford; Marios; Stanley Korshak
- Website: https://shop.mitchellstores.com/

The Mitchells Stores is an American family business in the luxury clothing industry. The company began in 1958 with just three men's suit styles priced at $65 each. It is a group of ten luxury stores led by co-CEOs Bob and Russ Mitchell.

The Mitchell family owns and operates Mitchells, Richards, Wilkes Bashford, Marios, and Stanley Korshak.

== History ==
Founded in 1958 as "Ed Mitchell" by Ed and Norma Mitchell, the original shop in Westport, Connecticut was formerly a plumbing-supply store and had only 800 ft^{2} of space selling three men's suit styles. Jack Mitchell joined the company in 1969. In 1990, Linda Mitchell, Jack's wife, joined the business to focus on women's wear.

The company acquired Richards of Greenwich, Connecticut in 1995 and Marsh's of Long Island, New York in 2005. Four years later, they acquired Wilkes Bashford of San Francisco and Palo Alto. The company began e-commerce in 2014. Mitchells acquired Marios of Bridgeport, Connecticut, Seattle and Portland in October 2015, and Stanley Korshak of Dallas in 2025.

Its ten stores carry brands including Brunello Cucinelli, Isaia, Kiton, Khaite, Loewe, and Zegna.
