= Bettanin & Venturi =

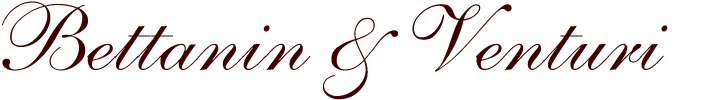
- Type: Private
- Industry: Fashion
- Founded: 1994; 32 years ago
- Headquarters: Vigasio, Verona, Italy
- Area served: Worldwide
- Products: Shoes and leather goods
- Website: www.bettaninshoes.com

Bettanin & Venturi is an Italian family and artisan company that manufactures luxury men's shoes. Founded by Giuseppe Bettanin, and Gianna Venturi in 1994, Bettanin & Venturi's workshop is located in Vigasio in the Province of Verona (Italy).

== Details ==
The company is known for very refined leather colorings.. The brand has a limited distribution in the world. In the United States, it is an exclusive of Barneys New York. The company also makes a line of accessories with finishes similar to those of their shoes.

== In fiction ==
The company's products have occasionally been used in fiction as examples of the sine qua non of the footwear of the ultra-rich, e.g.:

Like the authentic rich, this duo placed comfort ahead of appearance. The key was their footwear. The younger man wore the distinctive boat-shaped Bettanin & Venturi loafers, handmade in Italy. And he wore them without socks, as if he didn't care whether they fell victim to sweat, sand, or saltwater.

An hour and forty-five minutes later, the Teacher stood in front of a floor-length triple mirror in Barneys. "Does the gentleman like what he sees?" the salesman asked. The navy cashmere suit the Teacher now wore was a Gianluca Isaia, the bootlicker had told him in the loving, reverent tones of a saint uttering the name of God. The silk shirt was a Battistoni, the cap-toed lace-ups from Bettanin and Venturi. He had to admit, he looked pretty darn good. James Bond–suave. Like the latest actor, including new blond hair, thanks to the cut and dye job. "The gentleman loves what he sees," the Teacher finally said with a grin. "What's the bill again?"

== See also ==
- Stefano Bemer
