= Mariella Burani Fashion Group =

Italian clothing, jewelry, watches company

- Company type: Joint stock company (S.p.a.)
- Industry: clothing
- Founded: 1960; 66 years ago
- Defunct: 2010
- Fate: Fraudulent bankruptcy
- Headquarters: Cavriago, ITA
- Key people: Walter Burani, President; Mariella Burani, Creative Director; Giovanni Burani, CEO – Strategic Development & Finance; Andrea Burani, CEO – Product & Operations
- Products: clothing, accessories
- Number of employees: 2,200
- Website: www.mariellaburani.it

The Mariella Burani Fashion Group, based in Cavriago, was a clothing, jewelry and watches company. Founded in 1960 by Walter and Mariella Burani, it became a public company listed on the stock exchanges of Milan and London. In February 2010 the company declared bankruptcy.

== History ==
=== Foundation ===
In 1960 Walter and his wife Mariella founded the company with the purpose of the production and distribution of children's clothing.

After the rise of prêt-à-porter for women in the 1970s, the company began to export abroad in the 1980s, and expanded into other lines of clothing, as well as by opening stores.

=== IPO and expansion of the Group ===
In July 2000, it was announced that the company would be entering the Milan Stock Exchange. The shares were sold for 7 euro each on 13 and 14 July 2000. From 2000 to 2007 the group opened many new stores and made a number of acquisitions, including stakes in several companies in the leather industry, including Braccialini and Baldinini, Coccinelle, the aim being to cover different geographical areas, as well as offering a range of products.

=== Crisis and failure ===
By the summer of 2008 the value of the shares Mariella Burani had declined drastically, by 28 August 2009 they were valued at 2.522 euro each. On 31 August the Italian Stock Exchange announced that Mariella Burani FG ordinary shares were suspended from trading indefinitely. On 11 January 2010, the prosecutor in Milan filed a petition for bankruptcy for Mariella Buran]. On 11 February, the Court of Milan declared the failure of Burani Designer Holding, Diego Moscato was appointed as liquidator and on 26 Feb he resigned the entire board of directors On 28 July 2010, the financial police of Reggio Emilia arrested Walter Burani and his son John on charges of fraudulent bankruptcy. His father Walter was placed under house arrest while his son Giovanni was held in custody in San Vittore. On 26 September, Giovanni Burani was also placed under house arrest.

=== Trial for fraudulent bankruptcy and other financial crimes ===
In March 2019, the Supreme Court of Cassation confirmed the six-year prison sentence each for bankruptcy against Walter and Giovanni Burani for the company's bankruptcy in 2010. They were subsequently sentenced to a year and a half in prison also for stock market manipulation.

== Shareholders ==
- 74,223% Walter Burani
- 2,908% Lehman Brothers Holdings Inc
- 2,056% Powe Capital Management LLP
