= Wilkes Bashford =

American luxury retail clothing store

- Type: Subsidiary of privately held company
- Industry: Clothing retailer
- Founded: 1966 (60 years ago) in San Francisco, California, U.S.
- Founder: Wilkes Bashford
- Headquarters: San Francisco, California, U.S.
- Area served: California
- Key people: Jack Guillaume
- Parent: Mitchells Stores (since 2009 (17 years ago))
- Website: wilkesbashford.com

Wilkes Bashford is a luxury clothing retailer in San Francisco, California, United States. In November 2009, it was acquired by Mitchells Stores.

== History and operations ==
The flagship store was opened in 1966 by its namesake, Wilkes Bashford. It is favored by some prominent individuals, inckuding former San Francisco mayor Willie Brown.

The original store is in the Union Square Shopping District in San Francisco, California. Later, the company expanded to Stanford Shopping Center in Palo Alto, California, opening a 25,000 -square-foot flagship store on November 13, 2024.

It carries brands includibg Brioni, Brunello Cucinelli, Ermenegildo Zegna, Loro Piana, Kiton, Missoni, Pucci, Oxxford Clothes, Oscar de la Renta, Valentino, and more. The store has a shoe department featuring Manolo Blahnik, Christian Louboutin, Bontoni, John Lobb, and Gravati.

The store's namesake, Wilkes Bashford, died of prostate cancer on January 16, 2016, at the age of 82.

=== Controversies ===
In 1985, founder, Wilkes Bashford; and partner, Jack Guillaume, were charged with cheating the City of San Francisco out of $1 million in rent.

== In popular culture ==
Wilkes Bashford merchandise is an "addiction" for a wealthy closeted gay character, Beauchamp Day, in Armistead Maupin's eponymous first book from the Tales of the City novel series, which is set mostly in San Francisco.

== See also ==
- List of companies based in San Francisco
