= Brown University Computing Laboratory =

Building in Providence, Rhode Island

Coordinates: 41.8259°N 71.3988°W

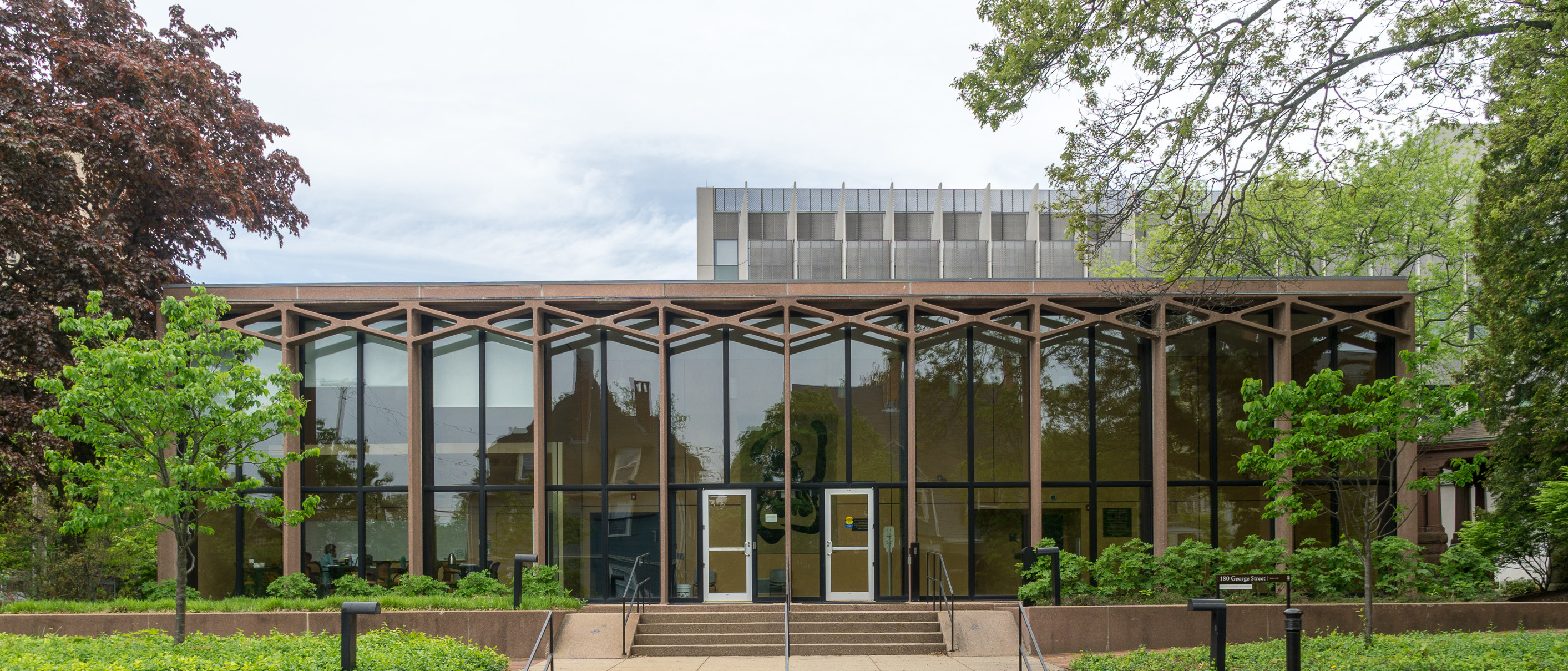
- The laboratory in 2018
- Interactive map of the Brown University Computing Laboratory area

General information
- Architectural style: Modernism
- Location: 180 George Street; Providence, Rhode Island
- Current tenants: Brown University Center for Computation and Visualization
- Owner: Brown University

Design and construction
- Architect: Philip Johnson

The Brown University Computing Laboratory is an academic building of Brown University located at 180 George Street in Providence, Rhode Island. It was built in 1960 and designed by noted architect Philip Johnson. The building was funded through a donation by the family of Thomas J. Watson, Sr. and dedicated to his memory. It was designed to house the IBM 7070 that was obtained through grants from the National Science Foundation and the IBM Corporation. On a wall in the main lobby hangs a tapestry given by Philip Johnson after a design by Arshile Gorky. The building was dedicated on January 12, 1961.

According to the Encyclopedia Brunoniana, Philip Johnson wrote, "I conceived the Brown Computing Laboratory as a porticus – a porch – to emphasize its importance as a technical center, its unique setting in the cityscape and its dignity as a memorial building. Though neo-Classical, therefore in conception, the materials and the design of the columns are quite contemporary. Only precast stone could have been used to form the X's of the entablature; only plate glass could render the porch usable in New England. By use of the red granite chips, I thought to harmonize the Laboratory with the 19th century which surrounds it."

When the building was first occupied, the machine room, a batch job submission and retrieval area, a keypunch room, and an extra room were on the first floor and staff offices and storage rooms were in the basement. Eventually, an IBM 1130 and 2250 display were installed in the extra room. By 1971, the extra room held the Brown University Graphics System (BUGS) a project of Prof. Andries van Dam. Many Brown University professors and students, including Prof. John E. Savage, submitted batch jobs to run on the university computer housed in the Lab. In 1971, the computer was an IBM System/360 Model 67.

Once the lab no longer housed the university mainframe computer, the first floor became a dedicated space for a virtual reality environment known as the YURT.

In 1988, the Applied Mathematics Division became the primary occupant after a new Center for Information Technology building was opened to house the Computer Science Department. Subsequently, the Center for Computation and Visualization (CCV) became the primary occupant. CCV is Brown University's research computing center. The basement was remodeled with offices and a small lounge.

In 2022, the Gorky tapestry was taken down for cleaning. It was discovered that it had been hanging in the wrong orientation for 61 years and remounted on the wall in the correct orientation.

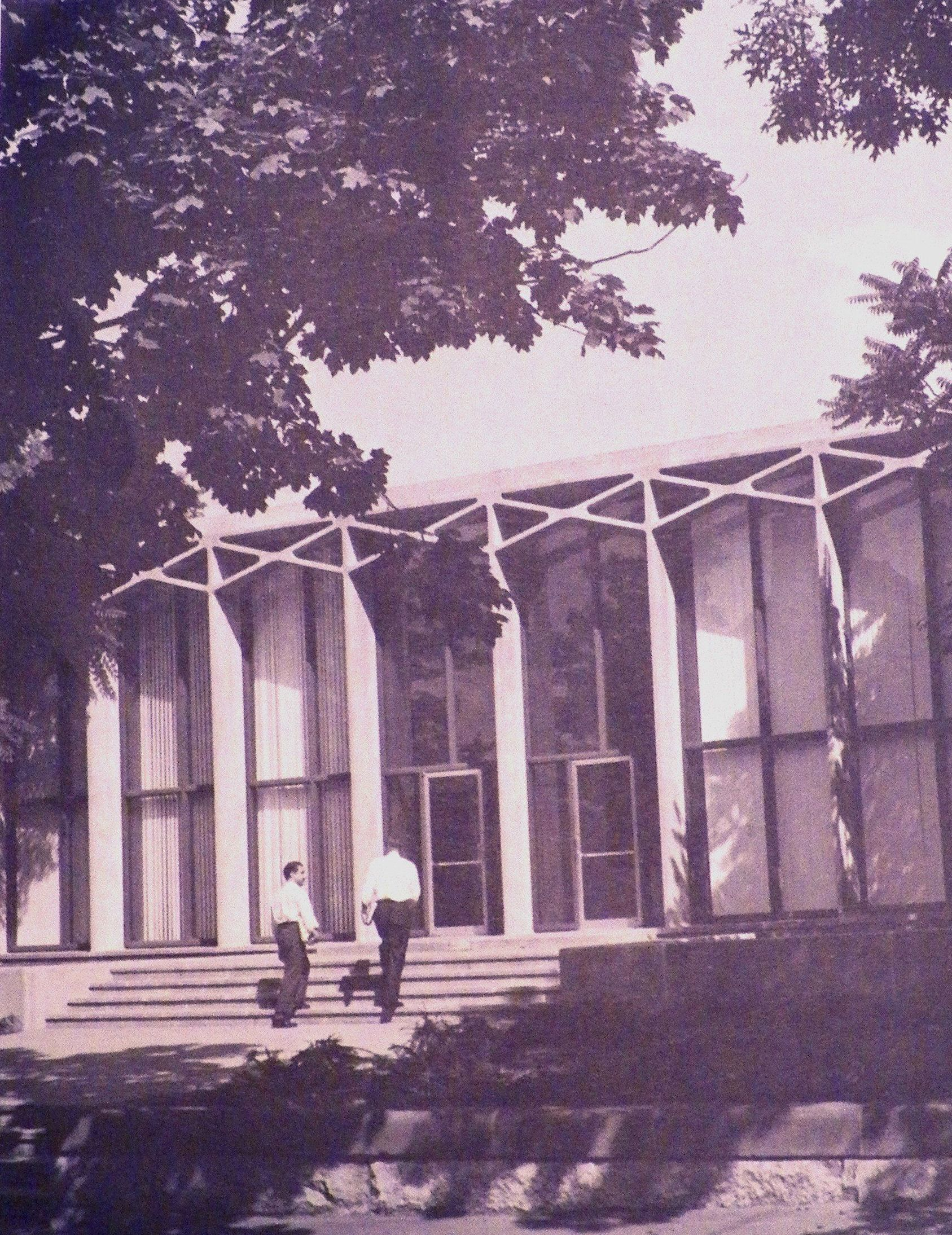
The laboratory in 1964

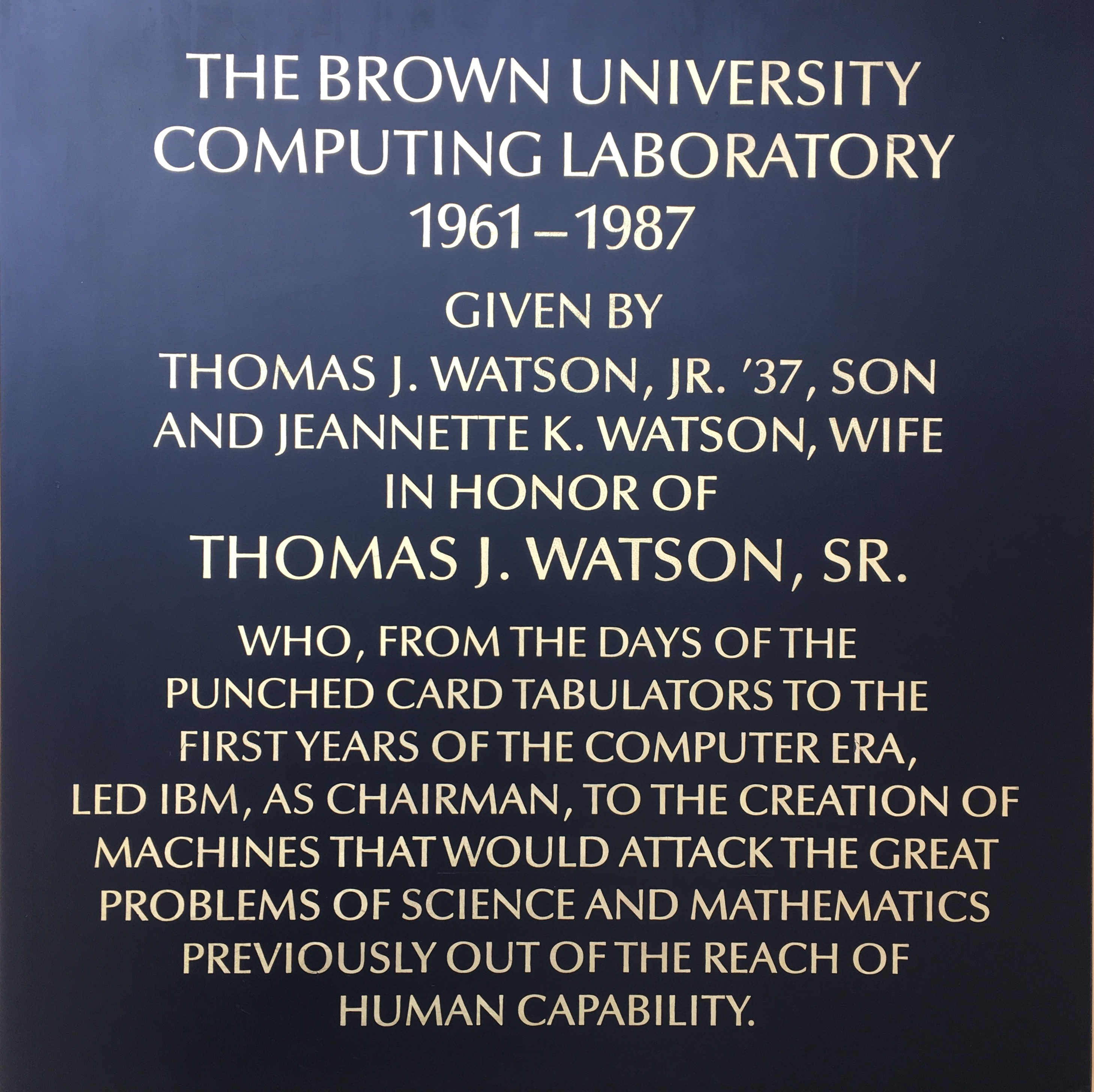
The dedication plaque

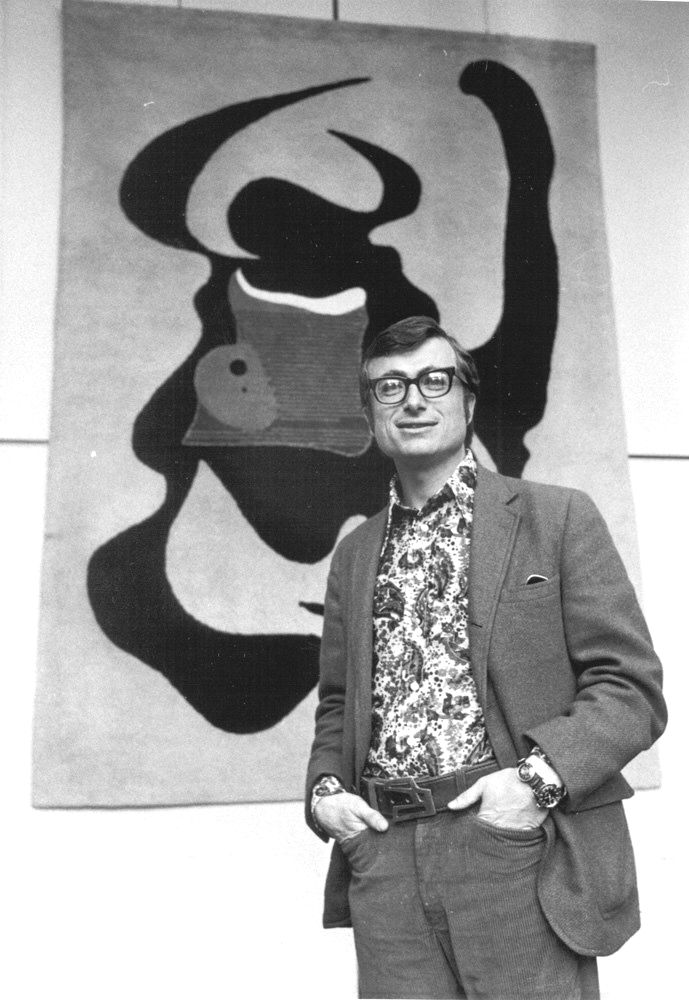
Prof. Andries van Dam with the Gorky tapestry

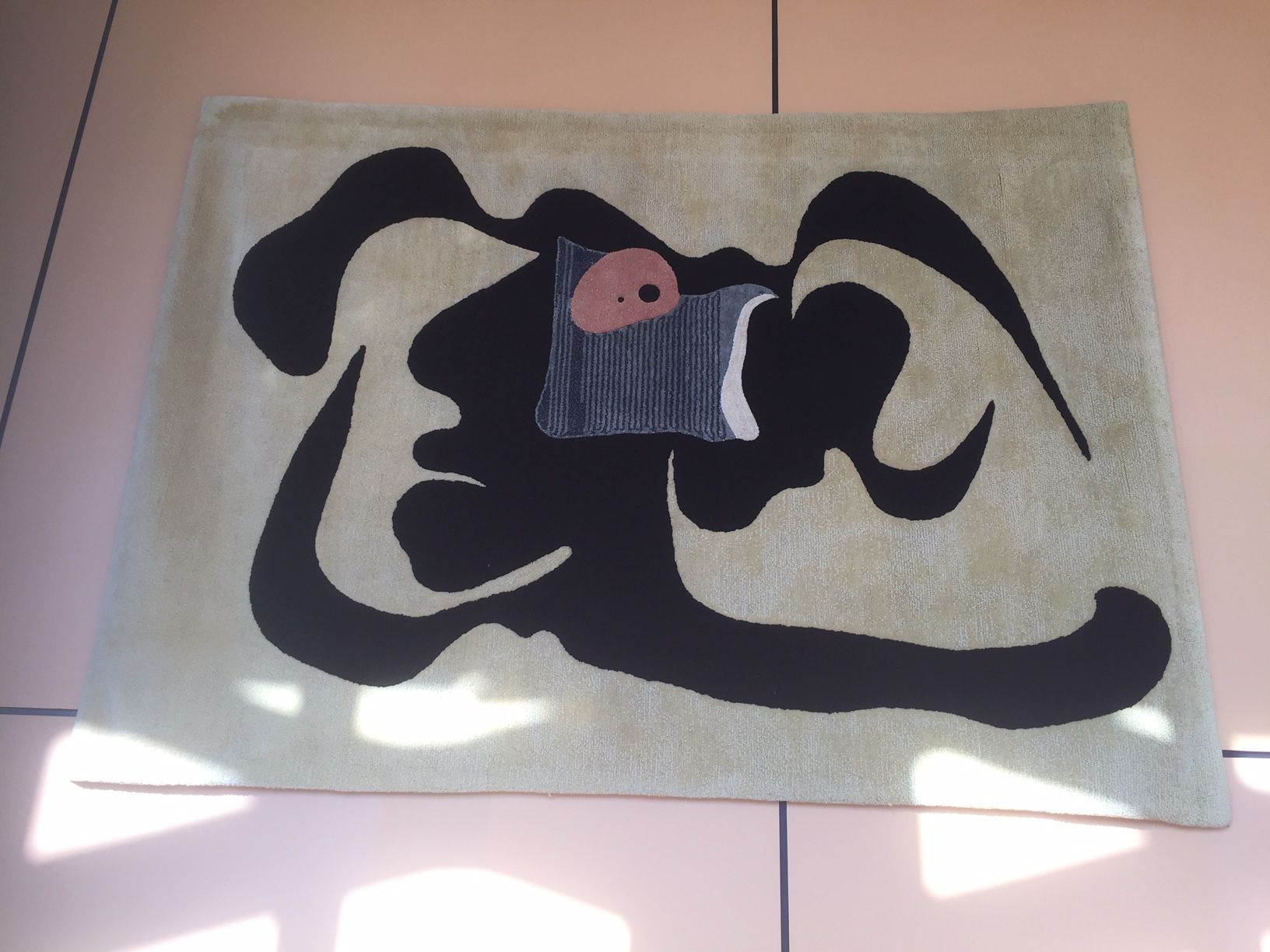
The correctly oriented tapestry
