= Braccialini =

Leather accessories company in Florence, Italy

- Type: Privately held company
- Industry: Fashion, luxury
- Founded: 1954; 72 years ago Florence, Italy
- Headquarters: Campi Bisenzio, Italy
- Products: Handbags, and accessories
- Website: www.Braccialini.com

Braccialini is a leather accessories company founded in 1954 and based in Florence, Italy. The company operates in 40 countries with 50 mono-brand stores globally.

== History ==
The image of a rose forms the brand's logo, inspired by co-founder, Carla Braccialini's love for flowers. In 2009, Italian president Giorgio Napolitano awarded Braccialini with the Cavaliere del Lavoro award, assigned to entrepreneurs for their contribution in their chosen field of profession.

=== Beginnings ===
Carla and her husband Roberto Braccialini started the company in 1954 as a small workshop with 4 to 5 employees in Florence, Italy. Initially, she started sewing without any formal knowledge with materials such as leather and straw, making clothes and selling them in Versilia, Italy. She then slowly moved to create bags with the same materials. Carla sketched the designs, and her husband made the bags and handled the business. The first bag was made with leather and straw, a unique choice at that time. She trained her team to learn the craft and sew. The bags were made to have a playful mood combined with unique designs and new materials.

A flood in 1966 in Florence destroyed all the fabrics and the archives. Carla, with her team, had to start all over.

=== 1980s ===
In the 1980s, two of Carla's three sons Riccardo and Massimo joined the company. In 1987, the company entered into many licensing agreements with companies like Vivienne Westwood for the production and distribution of accessories such as bags, belts, and small leather items. Contromano, a partner company, was founded the following year. Over the course of a few years, Braccialini entered into licensee agreements with brands like Roccobarocco, Fiorucci, and Bagutta.

=== 1990s ===
In 1990, Braccialini launched the Tua collection targeted to a younger audience. The first Braccialini boutique was also opened in Florence.

=== 2000s ===
The 2000s was a period of growth for the brand. Braccialini collaborated with the Mariella Burani Fashion Group. Braccialini opened stores in Milan. In 2003 a new mono-brand store opens in Milan followed by boutiques in Rome, London, Dubai in 2004. Also, a licensee agreement with Mariella Burani is established to produce and distribute accessories for them all over the world. In 2005, the first franchisee store in Saudi Arabia and two boutiques in Dubai and Hong Kong are opened. The company acquires a 100% stake in Dadorosa Srl, with a worldwide licensee of Gherardini, 2007 a Florentine brand. The expansion of the brand continues with new stores in Dubai, Paris, and Moscow. Braccialini also enters into more licensing agreements with Frangi Spa controlling the production of foulards, scarves, beachwear and lingerie.

In 2009, Braccialini moved to the new headquarters in Scandicci, Florence. The Feng Shui inspired factory is designed by Chan tit-Kwan from Hong Kong. The new building spreads across 10,000 square meters of space in heart of the leather manufacturing sector of Florence. The external façade is covered by vertical plants and ivy and the internal layout is constructed on the basis of Feng Shui principles. The factory also uses renewable sources of energy like solar panels and recovery of rainwater.

In 2015, a $300-dollar Braccialini car-shaped bag was featured in the 57th Annual Grammy awards. The bag was in the gift basket that all the nominees, presenters, and performers received.

== Present ==
Today, the company is led by Carla Braccialini's three sons – Riccardo, Massimo, and Lorenzo. Massimo is the style director, Riccardo the CEO, and Lorenzo the marketing and communication director. The creative team of designers led by Carla and her son Massimo creates handbags and accessories.

In October 2012 Braccialini announced up to 77 layoffs of 220 employees total, but in 2013, after an agreement with the unions, 25 people will leave the company due to the externalization of logistics.

== See also ==
- Italian fashion
- Made in Italy
