= Garolini =

Italian shoe company

- Industry: Shoes
- Founded: 1971; 55 years ago
- Founders: Ann "Bidi"; Albert "Al" Finkelstein
- Headquarters: Italy
- Products: Shoes

Garolini was an Italian shoe design and manufacturing company. It was founded by American spouses Ann "Bidi" and Albert "Al" Finkelstein in 1971.

== History ==
In 1971, the Finkelsteins created Garolini, named after their son Gary and daughter Lynn.

The business had limited success until the famous designer Halston saw the design work done by Bidi Finkelstein.

Garolini's shoes began to appear in Halston advertisements. These ads were painted by famous pop artist Andy Warhol.

The Finkelsteins sold the company to US Shoes in 1980. Though Garolini was named after the founders' children, Gary Stan and Lynn Finkelstein had nothing to do with the business.

== See also ==
- Pantofola d'Oro
