= Blake construction =

Method of making shoes

Blake construction is a method of making shoes invented in 1856 by Lyman Reed Blake.

It is especially popular in Italy. In a Blake construction, the outer sole is directly stitched to the insole with a chain stitch. This allows more flexibility and lighter weight compared to the sturdier Goodyear construction, which is more common among British shoemakers such as Crockett & Jones and Sanders.
