= Calzaturificio fratelli soldini =

Italian footwear manufacturer

Calzaturificio Fratelli Soldini
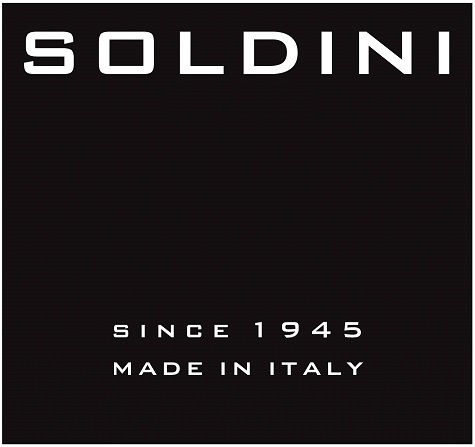
- Industry: Shoes
- Founded: 1945; 81 years ago
- Founder: Gustavo Soldini
- Headquarters: Capolona, Italy
- Website: www.calzaturificiosoldini.com

Calzaturificio Fratelli Soldini SpA is an Italian footwear manufacturer founded in Arezzo in 1945.

== History ==
In the spring of 1944, following a tip off, the Germans confiscated a machine for sewing shoes, belonging to the Soldini family. The machine was redeemed a few days later by Gustavo Soldini. Thanks to that machine, in 1945, Gustavo, together with his brothers Giuseppe and Ermenegildo began making shoes, first in a small area of their home and then in their first workshop. The market of reference was initially Arezzo and Florence, while the deliveries were made by bicycle during the weekend.

In the 1950s, Soldini opened his first factory in Capolona, on the banks of the River Arno, and then a second factory in Anghiari which marked the shift in production from small business to industry, with a workforce of over 800. The product was orientated towards the national marketplace, but also to the United States. To meet demand, another factory was opened in Malta, which carried on working until 2000.

In the 1980s, the United States market saw the development of competition with South American manufacturers, especially in Brazil; in the 1990s, competition grew further with the arrival of emerging Asian countries such as China and Vietnam. To deal with the economic slump, the company introduced new brands, including Stone Haven and Soldini Sport, choosing to focus on innovation.

Following a fire that completely destroyed the plant in Anghiari on the night of 13–14 April 1994, Gustavo Soldini left control of the company to his son, Rossano Soldini, who became director in 1998, proceeding to make investments, innovations and differentiations of the distribution channels.

From 2003 to 2007, Rossano Soldini held the role of President of the Assocalzaturifici, the National Association of Italian Footwear Manufacturers.

In this role, he asked the European Union to introduce anti-dumping charges for importing companies such as China and Vietnam.

In the 2000s, the Calzaturificio Fratelli Soldini entered into new markets, recording a series of international patents, linked above all to new natural, breathable materials used in the lines Ecogreen, Kifu and Drymore.

== Brands ==
The Calzaturificio Fratelli Soldini has manufactured the following brands:

- Soldini Uomo
- Soldini Donna
- Antica Cuoieria
- Stone Haven
- Soldini Junior
- Soldini Sport
- Ecogreen
- Kifu
- Drymore
- Soldini Professional (army, hospital, agrifood, industrial and first aid)
