= The Crescent (Dallas) =

Office/hotel/retail complex

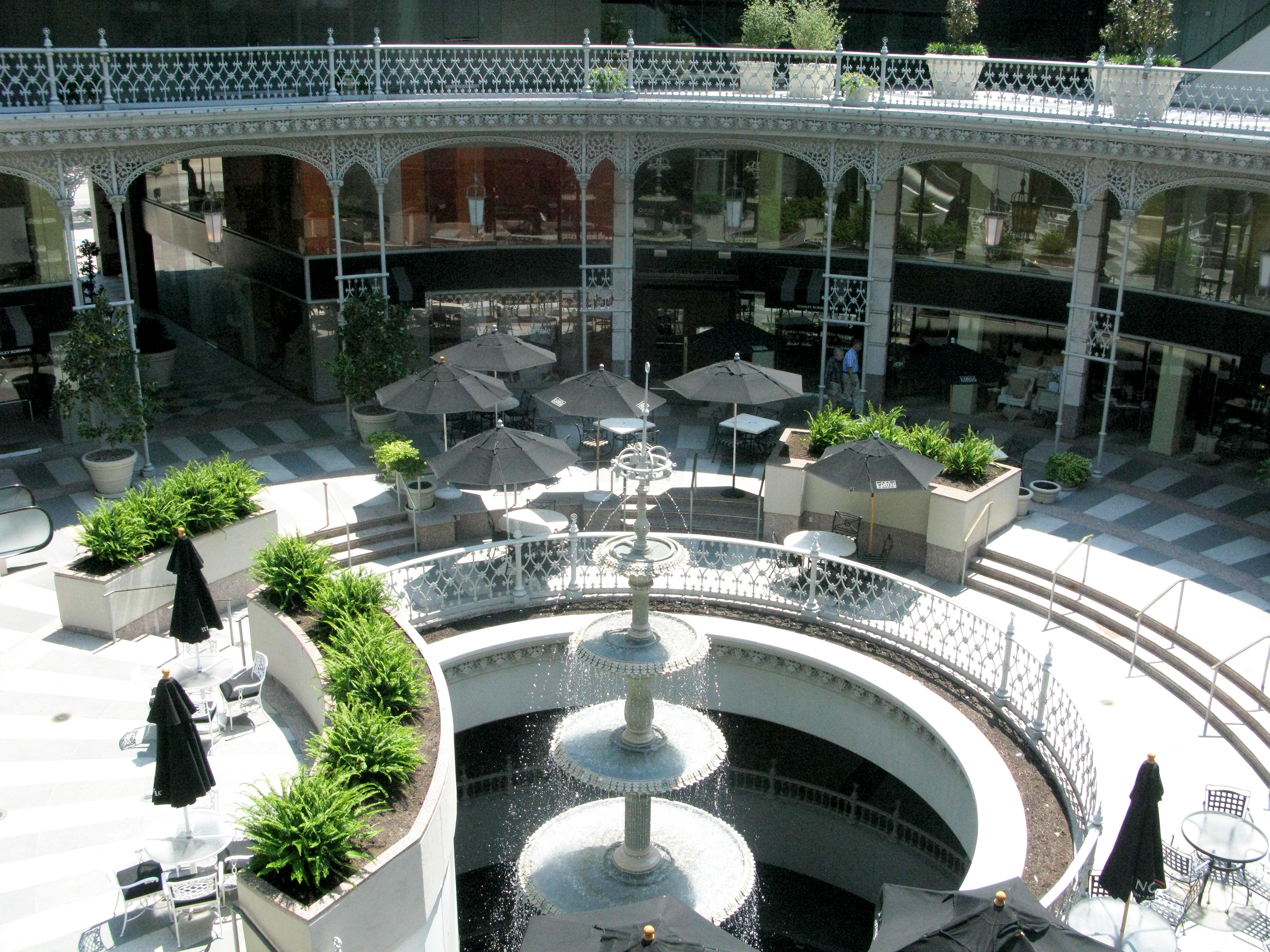

- Location within Texas

General information
- Type: Commercial offices, mixed-use
- Location: 200 Crescent Court; Dallas, Texas, United States
- Coordinates: 32.7937°N 96.8039°W
- Construction started: 1982
- Completed: 1986
- Cost: Estimated $400 million

Height
- Roof: 76.0537 m (249.520 ft)

Technical details
- Floor count: 19
- Floor area: 1,134,826 square feet (100,000 m^{2})

Design and construction
- Architect: Johnson/Burgee Architects
- Main contractor: The Beck Group

Other information
- Public transit: M-Line: McKinney & Maple

The Crescent is a postmodern office, hotel, and retail complex located at 200 Crescent Court in Uptown Dallas, Texas, United States. The 10-acre complex was designed by Philip Johnson and John Burgee and was completed in 1986. The structure has 1,134,826 square feet (100,000 m^{2}) of office space in three office towers, Hotel Crescent Court, and an upscale shopping center including department store Stanley Korshak.

== History ==
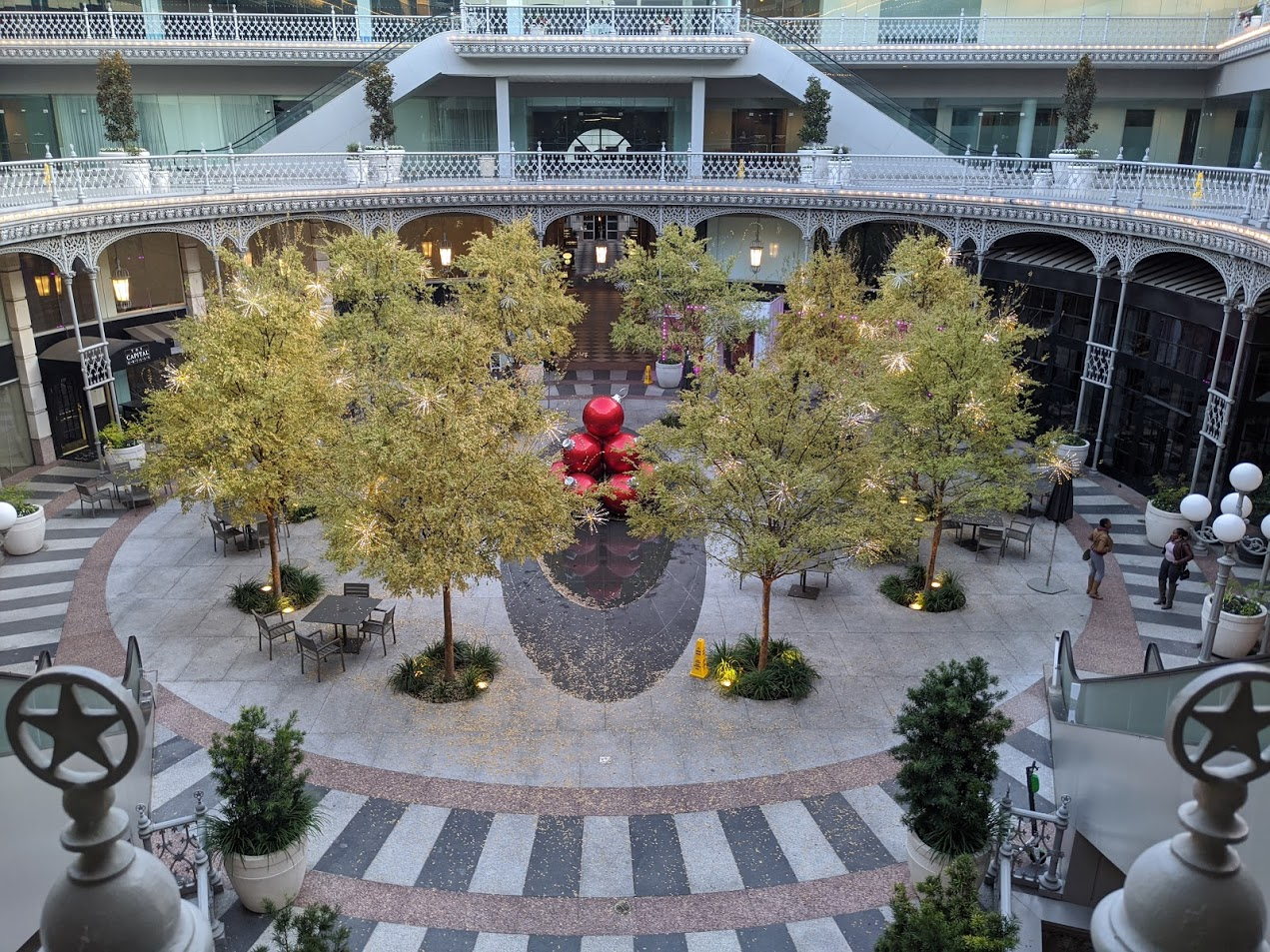
The Center Court

In the early 1980s Dallas developer Caroline Hunt and Rosewood Corp. purchased several blocks of old automobile dealerships north of downtown Dallas with plans to create a grand mixed-use development. Excavation began with one of the largest holes on record, creating a 5-level, 4,100 space underground parking facility. The development was one of the most expensive ever constructed in Dallas with an estimated cost of $400 million. Opening in 1986 with a gala event, the complex initially struggled to attract tenants during a depressed economy. Its elegant appointments and location in the center of the (then) transitioning Uptown neighborhood attracted multiple financial firms and upscale retailers (moving the center of the financial industry from Main Street to Uptown). The Crescent is sometimes credited for setting the quality level for much of the surrounding neighborhood, and today commands some of the highest office rents in Dallas. During final construction activities in 1986, The Crescent's parking garage was used by Orion Pictures and director Paul Verhoeven to stage and film a scene for Robocop. In 2014 plans were announced to transform and update the exterior of the building, resulting in more park space along with retail and office upgrades.

On January 7, 2025, Los Angeles Lakers general manager Rob Pelinka and Dallas Mavericks general manager Nico Harrison began discussions that would lead to the controversial blockbuster trade of Mavericks star Luka Dončić to the Lakers at a coffee shop in the lobby of the Hotel Crescent Court.

== Design ==
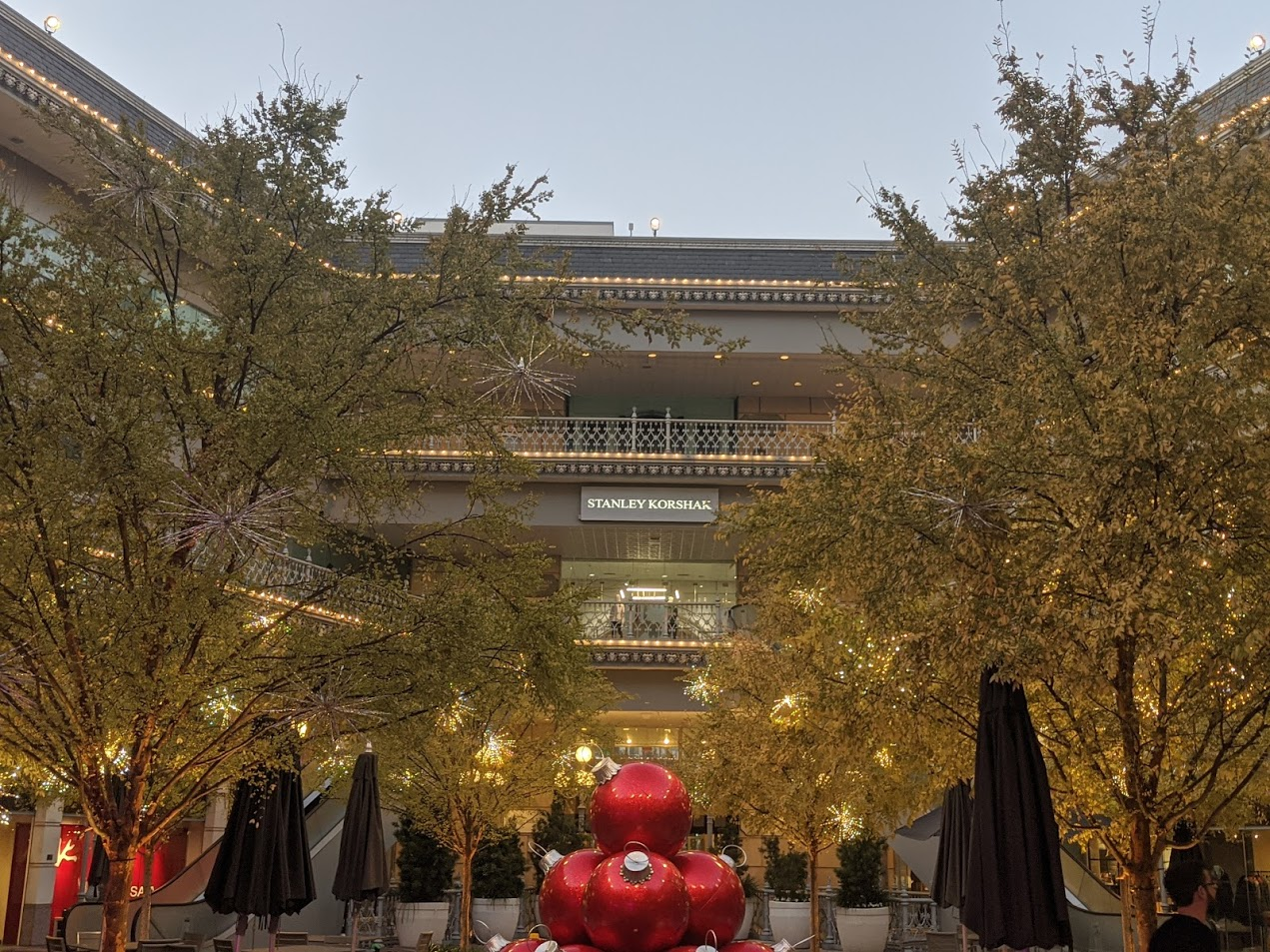
Stanley Korshak; From the first level

Designed by architects Philip Johnson and John Burgee, The Crescent's neo-French classical design was meant to evoke historic architecture of Galveston on a massive scale. The resulting architecture was heavily criticized at the time of completion, but has grown into favor as the neighborhood evolved. The complex comprises several structures:

- An office complex with a contiguous 19-story center tower and two 18-story side towers set in a Crescent-shaped contour.
- A 5-story central building containing the Hotel Crescent Court separated from the office complex by a central motor court.
- A low-rise, triangular retail and office building

The entire complex is clad in acres of Indiana limestone, eclipsing the Empire State Building for the amount of limestone used during construction. The building lobby areas are finished in ten different types of marble, and covering the complex is the largest cut slate roof in the world (250,000 tiles installed by skilled craftsmen). The exterior is adorned with $6 million worth of ornamental cast aluminum used on balconies, trellises and railings.
