= Stefano Bemer =

Italian shoemaker

- Born: 22 June 1964; Florence, Italy
- Died: 27 July 2012 (aged 48); Florence, Italy
- Occupation: Shoemaker
- Years active: 1983-2012

Stefano Bemer (22 June 1964 – 27 July 2012) was an Italian shoemaker, based in Florence. Bemer's clients included the actor Andy Garcia, designer Gianfranco Ferré, singer Julio Iglesias, and the poet Adam Brower.

The actor Sir Daniel Day-Lewis worked as an apprentice for Bemer for eight months between 1999 and 2000, showing up for work at 8am every day. Bemer's website states, "What many do not know is what brought them together: perfectionism. DD Lewis and Stefano shared the same passion for their respective forms of art." The London shoe designer Justin FitzPatrick also did an apprenticeship with the shoemaker in 2008–2009. His handmade shoes are highly prized.

He died in Florence after a long illness on 27 July 2012, at the age of 48.

Nowadays, the company is carried on by Tommaso Melani and his Scuola del Cuoio family company. Stefano Bemer is now a large artisanal workshop nested in a chapel in Via San Niccoló in Florence and has a direct showroom in New York City.
