= Stanley Korshak =

Luxury department store in Dallas Texas

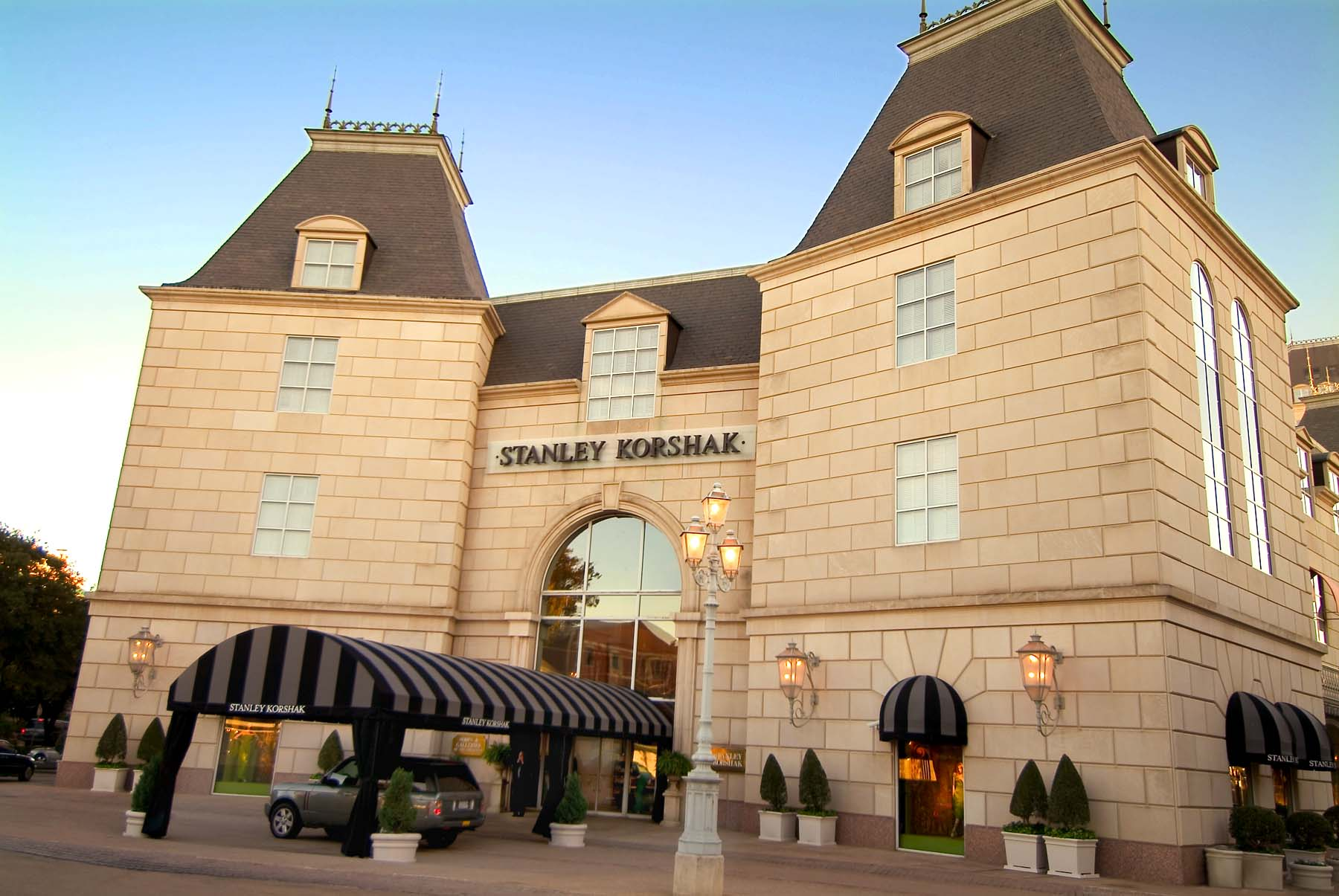
Stanley Korshak store at The Crescent

Stanley Korshak is an American luxury goods specialty department store in Dallas, Texas. It is located in the Uptown neighborhood in The Crescent retail complex. Mitchells Stores acquired Stanley Korshak in 2025.

== History ==
In 1909 Stanley Korshak opened a luxury goods store in Chicago, one of the first to offer designer women's apparel. After suffering financial problems throughout the 1980s, Dallas heiress and developer Caroline Hunt purchased the rights to the name. A new store in Dallas in the upscale Crescent development opened in 1986; the store in Chicago closed in 1990. The Dallas store was managed by Crawford Brock since 1987, and he purchased the business in 2002. Over the years the store has expanded to include additional departments and offerings covering 75,000 square feet. It has garnered several awards and accolades, including being named one of the 50 most influential men's stores in America by Women's Wear Daily in 2013. Industry estimates put annual sales at $40 million, or $600 per square foot.
