= List of Bajaj Auto products =

This is a list of products produced by Bajaj Auto today or previously.

== Current Line Up ==
=== Motorcycles ===
- Pulsar 125
- Pulsar 150
- Pulsar 220F
- Pulsar N125
- Pulsar N160
- Pulsar N250
- Pulsar NS125
- Pulsar NS160
- Pulsar NS200
- Pulsar NS400z
- Pulsar RS200
- Freedom 125 NG04
- Dominar 250
- Dominar 400
- Avenger Cruise 220
- Avenger Street 160
- Platina 100
- Platina 110
- CT110X

=== Three Wheelers ===
- RE Compact 4S
- RE Maxima
- RE Maxima X-Wide
- RE Maxima Z
- RE Maxima C
- RE Maxima XL
- Gogo P5009
- Gogo P5012
- GoGo P7012

=== Four Wheelers ===
- Bajaj Qute

=== Scooters ===
- Bajaj Chetak Electric scooter

== Discontinued ==
=== Scooters ===
- Vespa 150
- Bajaj 150
- Bajaj Bravo
- Bajaj Chetak
- Bajaj Chetak 99
- Bajaj Chetak 4s
- Bajaj Cub
- Bajaj Classic
- Bajaj Kristal
- Bajaj Legend
- Bajaj M50
- Bajaj M80
- Bajaj M80 4s
- Bajaj Priya
- Bajaj Rave
- Bajaj Sunny
- Bajaj Stride
- Bajaj Saffire
- Bajaj Sunny Spice
- Bajaj Spirit
- Bajaj Super
- Bajaj Super Excel
- Bajaj Super 99
- Bajaj Wave
- Bajaj Viking

=== Motorcycles ===
- Bajaj Kawasaki 4S Champion
- Bajaj Kawasaki Aspire
- Bajaj Kawasaki Boxer
- Bajaj Kawasaki Boxer AT
- Bajaj Kawasaki Boxer AR
- Bajaj Kawasaki Boxer CT
- Bajaj Kawasaki Caliber 110
- Bajaj Kawasaki Caliber 115
- Bajaj Kawasaki Caliber Croma 110
- Bajaj Kawasaki Eliminator 175
- Bajaj Kawasaki KB100
- Bajaj Kawasaki KB125
- Bajaj Kawasaki Wind 125
- Bajaj Avenger 180
- Bajaj Avenger 200
- Bajaj Avenger Street 150
- Bajaj Avenger Street 180
- Bajaj Avenger Street 220
- Bajaj BYK
- Bajaj Boxer BM150
- Bajaj Discover 100
- Bajaj Discover 110
- Bajaj Discover 125
- Bajaj Discover 135
- Bajaj Discover 150
- Bajaj Discover 100M
- Bajaj Discover 100T
- Bajaj Discover 125M
- Bajaj Discover 125T
- Bajaj Discover 125ST
- Bajaj Discover 150S
- Bajaj Discover 150F
- Bajaj Platina 125
- Bajaj Pulsar 200 DTS-I
- Bajaj Pulsar 180
- Bajaj Pulsar 180F
- Bajaj Pulsar 220S
- Bajaj Pulsar F250
- Bajaj Pulsar P150
- Bajaj Pulsar N150
- Bajaj Prowler RR125
- Bajaj SX Enduro
- Bajaj CT 100 & CT100B
- Bajaj CT 110
- Bajaj CT 125X
- Bajaj XCD 125
- Bajaj XCD 135
- Bajaj V15
- Bajaj V12

=== Three wheelers ===
- Bajaj FE Rickshaw
- Bajaj FE Pickup
- Bajaj RE models with numberings (there wasn't any specific name for autorickshaws then and there were numberings only, Bajaj replaced it with names like Compact/Maxima)
- Bajaj RE Compact 2S
- Bajaj RE Compact+
- Bajaj RE Optima

== See also ==
- List of motor scooter manufacturers and brands
- List of motorcycle manufacturers
