= Cub =

A cub is the young of certain large predatory animals, such as big cats and bears.

Cub or CUB may also refer to:

== Arts and entertainment ==
- The Cub, a 1915 American silent film
- Cub (film), a 2014 film
- C.U. Burn, an Irish-language television series
- Cub (Happy Tree Friends), a character in the Happy Tree Friends animated video series
- Cub Records, a record label
- Cub (band), a former band from Vancouver, Canada

== Aircraft and aviation ==
- Cub Aircraft, a former Canadian aircraft manufacturer
- Antonov An-12, a Russian transport aircraft (NATO reporting name: Cub)
- Napier Cub, an experimental British aircraft engine
- Piper J-3 Cub, an American light aircraft
- Taylor Cub, a precursor aircraft to the Piper Cub
- Zlin Savage Cub, a Czech light aircraft
- Cubana de Aviación (ICAO airline designator: CUB), Cuban national airline
- Jim Hamilton–L.B. Owens Airport (IATA airport code and FAA location identifier both CUB), serving Columbia, South Carolina, United States

== Motor vehicles ==
- Auto Cub, an American single-passenger automobile
- Bajaj Cub, an Indian motor scooter
- Farmall Cub, an American tractor
- Honda Super Cub, a range of motorcycles
- LDV Cub, a British van
- Leyland Cub, a British bus
- Andersen Mini-Cub, a version of the Mini Moke
- Kapcai, a class of motorcycle of Southeast Asia; see Malaysian Cub Prix

== People ==
- Cub (nickname), a list of people
- Cub Scout, a member of a Cub Scout organization
- a young member of the Bear (gay culture) community

== Other uses ==
- Cub Foods, an American supermarket chain
- Carlton & United Breweries, an Australian brewing company
- Cashed Up Bogan, a slang term used in Australia and New Zealand
- Cuba, IOC country code: CUB
- Cursor Back (ANSI), an ANSI X3.64 escape sequence
- University of Colorado at Boulder (CU Boulder)
- University City of Bogotá (Spanish: Ciudad Universitaria de Bogotá)
- Urban Community of Bordeaux (French: Communauté Urbaine de Bordeaux)

== See also ==
- Cubs (disambiguation)
- Kub (disambiguation)
