= RE60 =

RE60 may refer to:

- Renault RE60, a Formula One car raced by the Renault team in the 1985 Formula One season.
- Bajaj RE60, a mini car produced by Bajaj Auto in partnership with Nissan and Renault
