= Saffire =

Saffire may refer to:

- Saffire (guitar quartet), an Australian guitar ensemble
- Saffire – The Uppity Blues Women, an American blues ensemble
- Saffire (company), an American video game developer
- Bajaj Saffire, a scooter produced by Bajaj Auto
- Safire Theatre complex in Chennai, India

== See also ==
- Sapphire, a gem variety of the mineral corundum
