= Bajaj Lite =

The Bajaj Lite is a concept car unveiled by Bajaj Auto at the Auto Expo 2008 in New Delhi. Bajaj auto produce two wheelers and this prototype was introduced to upgrade from two wheels to four wheel product range. The concept is worked on to offer low running cost and higher fuel efficiency. Bajaj was in talks with Renault for mass production.
