= Bajaj Saffire =

High end gear-less motor scooter

- Manufacturer: Bajaj Auto
- Production: 2000–2003
- Predecessor: Spirit
- Successor: Wave
- Class: Scooter
- Engine: 93 cc (5.7 cu in) four-stroke
- Top speed: 70 km/h (43 mph)
- Power: 7.6 bhp (5.7 kW)
- Torque: 1 N⋅m (0.74 lb⋅ft)
- Transmission: Automatic
- Brakes: Drum (front and rear)
- Fuel capacity: 5 L (1.1 imp gal; 1.3 US gal)
- Related: Spirit; Wave

The Bajaj Saffire was an automatic motor scooter produced in India by Bajaj Auto from 2000 to 2003.
