= Bajaj Avenger =

Indian cruiser bike by Bajaj Auto

Avenger
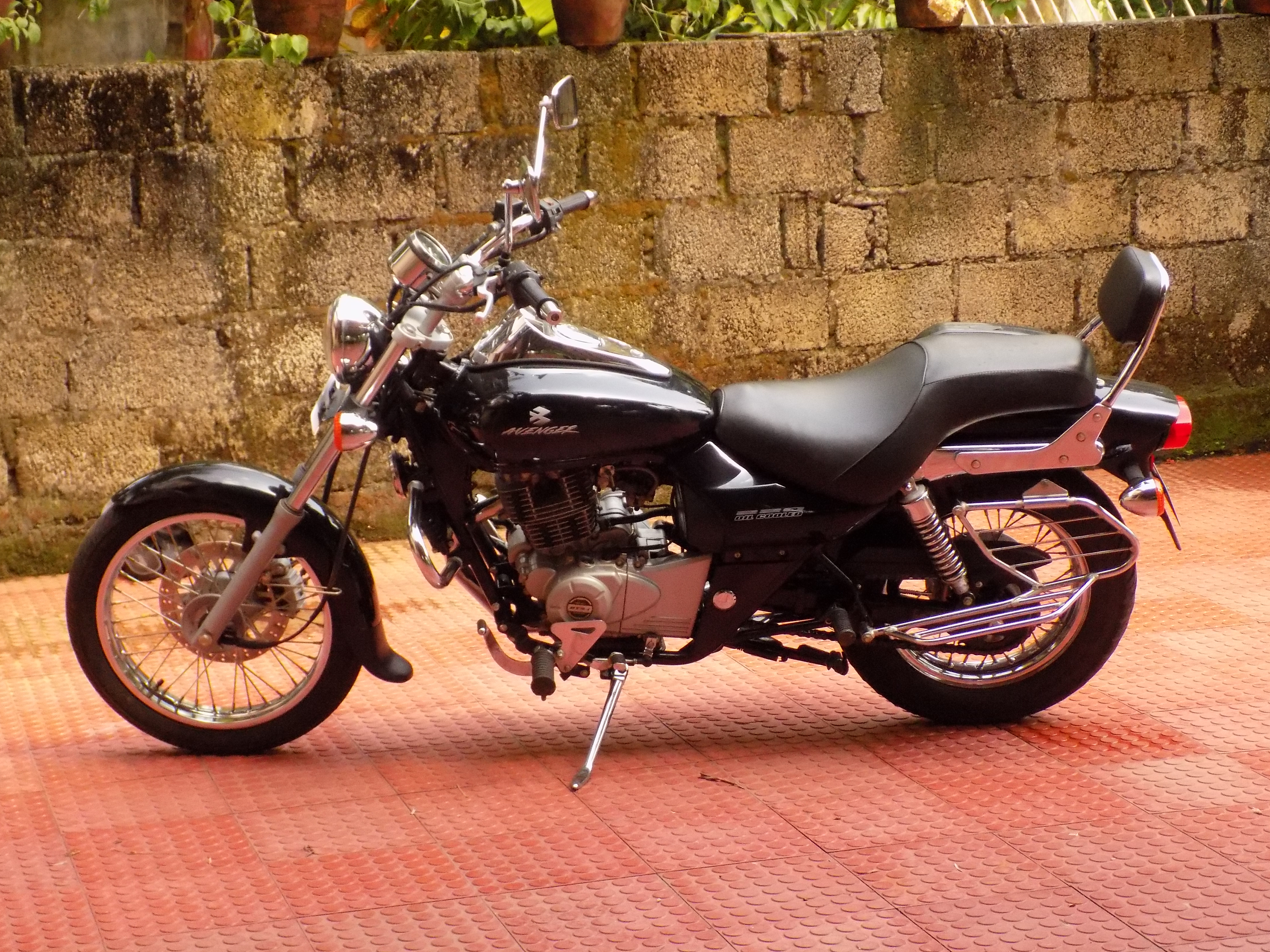
- Manufacturer: Bajaj Auto
- Production: 2005–present
- Predecessor: Kawasaki Eliminator
- Class: Cruiser
- Engine: 219.89 cc (13.419 cu in) oil-cooled, four-stroke cycle, twin Spark, 2 valve, DTS-i engine 150 cc (9.2 cu in) air-cooled
- Transmission: 5-speed manual (1-down, 4-up)
- Suspension: Telescopic front, 140 mm travel; adjustable rear shock, 90 mm travel 17-inch front tyre, 15-inch rear
- Brakes: 260 mm hydraulic disk front; drum rear
- Wheelbase: 1,475 mm (58.1 in)
- Dimensions: L: 2,195 mm (86.4 in); W: 806 mm (31.7 in); H: 1,070 mm (42 in)
- Fuel capacity: 14 L (3.1 imp gal; 3.7 US gal)

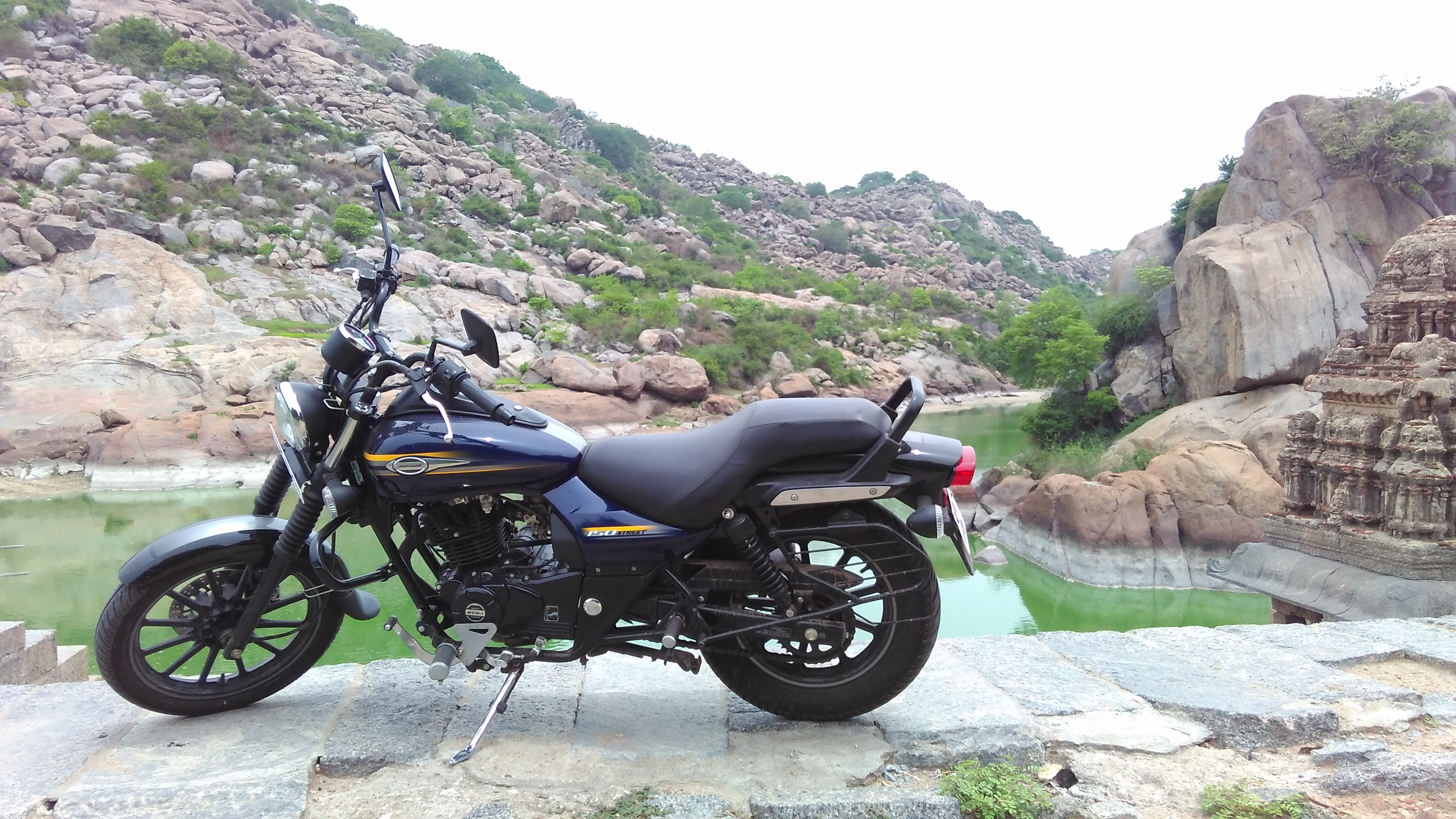
Bajaj Avenger Street 150cc

The Bajaj Avenger is a cruiser style motorcycle designed and manufactured by Bajaj Auto in India. It draws the styling and other design cues from the Kawasaki Eliminator which had an air-cooled, single-cylinder Kawasaki engine and was sold at a premium. It was launched with a 180 cc engine, which has subsequently been increased to 200 cc and then 220 cc.

== 1st generation (2005–2015) ==
=== Avenger 180 ===
To gain a strategic position in the premium segment, Bajaj engineers replaced the Kawasaki engine with underpowered, 178.6 cc DTS-i engine from the Bajaj Pulsar sportbike. However, the engine had to be re-tuned to suit the torque-demanding characteristics of a cruiser. The bike was launched on 6 September 2005. It is also the first cruiser developed by an Indian company. The wheelbase is 1,475 mm (58.1 in). Mileage around 45 kmpl

=== Avenger 200 ===
The Avenger was upgraded in 2007 with an increase in engine capacity to 200 cc. The oil-cooled engine was a modified version of that fitted to the Pulsar 200. The Avenger 200 features a modified engine of Pulsar 200, delivering 0.5 bhp power and 0.4 kgf·m (4 N·m) torque less than the Pulsar. The bike has a top speed of 114 km/h (71 mph). It does 0 to 60 km/h (0 to 37 mph) in 5.18 seconds and 0 to 100 km/h (0 to 62 mph) in 20.03 seconds.

=== Avenger 220 ===
In July 2010, Bajaj launched a 220 cc version of Bajaj Avenger, with slight changes in its dial in tank showing indicators, fuel level, status and headlight. It comes in various colors and with an oil-cooled radiator for its engine. Avenger 220 gives an average of 35–40 km/L. Top Speed 135 km/h

Its gross weight is approx 185 kg. And Kerb weight is approx 154 kg. Cruising speed is 70–80 km/h with mileage of 40 km/L on highways and hills like to mountain areas. Tank capacity is 14 L. Avenger 220 is a successful cruiser in India when compared with others with reliability, price tag, performance, maintenance cost, power and glamour.

These models are now discontinued.

== 2nd generation (2015–2017) ==
The bikes got a completely new makeover, with new design elements such as a new Avenger insignia, paint jobs, alloy wheels etc. Two versions, Street and Cruise, were introduced, with the former designed as a cross between a cruiser and a city bike in terms of handlebar positioning and handling etc., while the latter being a more textbook cruiser. The Street came with two engine options: 150 cc and 220 cc, while the Cruise comes only with a 220 cc engine.

=== Avenger Street 150 ===
It comes with a 150cc engine. It was launched on 2015 October along with Avenger Street 220 and Avenger 220 Cruise. It works on carburettor system. It has an impressive mileage of 45 km/L and draws a top speed of 117 km/h. Avenger 150 street requires 1150 mL of Engine oil to refill at servicing.

=== Avenger Street 220 ===
It has the same engine and specifications as its predecessors, but the engine has been detuned to produce more torque in the mid revs. Matte black paint can be seen across the bike with blackened alloy wheels, side mirrors and a back fender too, with white striped decals running down the length of the bike. It comes with a newly designed street control handlebar, wider tyres and a 260mm front disc brake. It boasts a top speed of 120 km/h and accelerates from 0 to 100 km/h in 12.3 seconds. It works on Carburetor injection system unlike its 150cc brother. The Avenger street has an orange backlit digital meter.

=== Avenger Cruise 220 ===
This bike is similar to the outgoing Avenger 220 model with a few cosmetic changes. There is a new Avenger insignia and more chrome addition in the form of oil cooler and horn. An optional windshield is also available. The Avenger Cruise 220 is closest to the classical cruiser look among the 3 variants released. The Avenger Cruise has ergonomic changes in its handlebar when compared to its predecessors thereby giving it more cruise like riding feel for the rider. The Avenger Cruise has a blue back lit digital meter. Currently its available in Ebony Black and Desert Gold colors.

== 3rd generation (January 2018 – present) ==
The third generation of the widely successful Avenger required an update in order to deal with competition such as the Suzuki Intruder, which was launched in Q3, 2017. With this update, the 150 cc version was retired in favour of a 180 cc version.

The third generation brought with it a slew of design changes such as a new headlamp with LED DRLs. A digital instrument cluster, backlit with blue on the Cruise and Orange on the Street, is also a recent addition. There is also a new tall shroud that shields the instrument cluster from direct sunlight. The new cluster gets a speedometer, two trip meters, fuel gauge and a service reminder. The back grab rail for the Street version has been revamped too.

The Avenger insignia has also been changed and made bigger. There are new graphics and colours for all three variants, too:

Avenger Cruise 220: Auburn Black, Moon White

Avenger Street 220: Matt Black, Matt White

Avenger Street 180: Red, Black

Apart from these, there are no mechanical changes to any of the bikes.

In May 2019, Bajaj launched Avenger Street 160 ABS. The bike was launched in two colors - Ebony Black and Spicy Red.

== The Avenger Gods ==
The Avenger Gods, also known as TAG, is the official (as in promoted by Bajaj Motorcycles) biker club for Bajaj Avenger riders. TAG organizes group rides for all enthusiasts.

There are also many other Avenger biker clubs throughout the country like Avenger Motorcycle Club, Bajaj Avenger Club and so on.
