= Bajaj Super =

Type of scooter

Bajaj Super FE
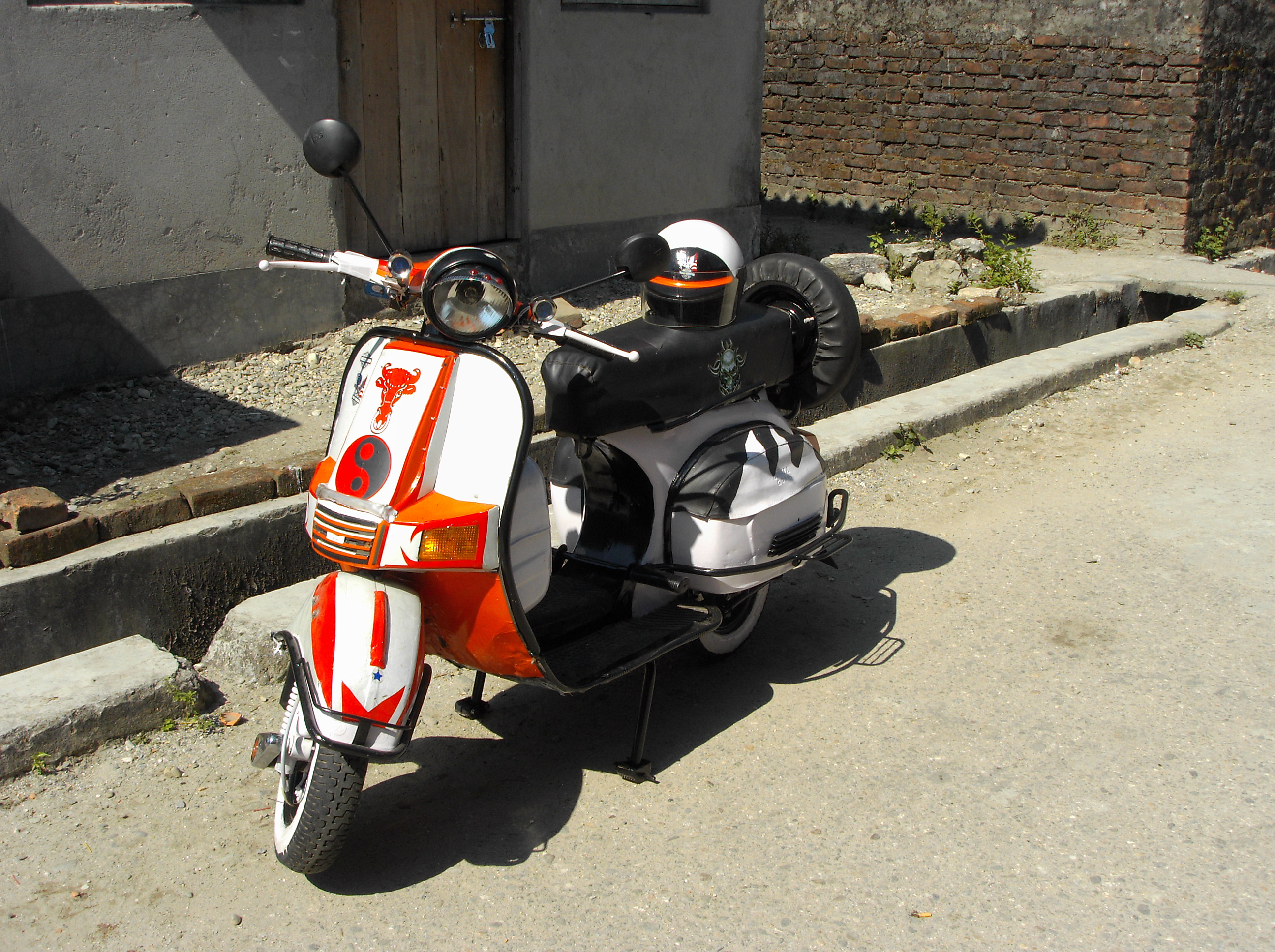
- Bajaj Super scooter
- Manufacturer: Bajaj Auto
- Production: 1976–2006
- Assembly: Pune, India
- Successor: Bajaj Super FE (12V)
- Class: Scooter
- Engine: 125 cc (7.6 cu in) single-cylinder two-stroke
- Top speed: 80 km/h (50 mph)
- Power: 5.9 bhp (4.4 kW) (6V) / 7.5 bhp (5.6 kW) (12V) @ 5,500 rpm
- Torque: 1.01 kg⋅m (9.9 N⋅m; 7.3 lbf⋅ft)
- Transmission: 4-speed manual (twist grip, 1-up 3-down pattern)
- Brakes: Drum (front and rear)
- Tires: 3.50×8 (front and rear)
- Fuel capacity: 5 L (1.1 imp gal; 1.3 US gal)
- Fuel consumption: 35–45 km/L (82–106 mpg_{‑US}; 99–127 mpg_{‑imp})

The Bajaj Super was a motor scooter produced in India by Bajaj Auto, launched in 1976 and discontinued in 2006. It was equipped with a 150-cubic-centimetre (9.2 cu in) two-stroke engine.
