= Bajaj Freedom 125 NG04 =

Natural gas powered motorcycle

Bajaj Freedom 125
- Manufacturer: Bajaj Auto
- Also called: Freedom 125 NG04; Freedom 125 CNG
- Production: 2024–present
- Class: Commuter
- Engine: 125 cc (7.6 cu in) single-cylinder (bi-fuel CNG / petrol)
- Range: 200 km (120 mi) (CNG)

The Bajaj Freedom 125 NG04, also known as the Freedom 125 CNG or simply Freedom 125, is a small-displacement motorcycle produced by Bajaj Auto of India. The motorcycle is claimed by the manufacturer to be "the world's first CNG motorcycle." The 125 cc engine can run on both compressed natural gas and petrol, with a switch provided to change which tank is in use. The tank may be switched while stationary or while the bike is running. The motorcycle is designed to travel 200 km (120 mi) on a full tank of natural gas. It entered mass production in 2024 for the 2025 model year.
