= Bajaj Wave =

- Manufacturer: Bajaj Auto
- Predecessor: Saffire
- Class: Scooter
- Engine: 109.7 cc (6.69 cu in) single-cylinder DTS-i
- Power: 8 bhp (6.0 kW)
- Transmission: CVT
- Related: Bajaj Saffire

The Bajaj Wave is a motor scooter manufactured by Bajaj Auto. A revised version of the Bajaj Saffire, the Wave features a 109.7-cubic-centimetre (6.69 cu in) DTS-i engine, continuously variable transmission (CVT), and updated body panels. The engine produces a maximum power output of 8 bhp (6.0 kW). The scooter also includes Bajaj's ExhausTEC technology and a ride control switch.

It competes against the Honda Activa and the TVS Scooty Pep.
