= Cubs =

Cubs may refer to:

- The young of certain large predatory animals such as bears and big cats; analogous to a domestic puppy or kitten
- Chicago Cubs, a baseball team of the National League of Major League Baseball (United States of America)
- Iowa Cubs, a minor league baseball team of the International League
- South Bend Cubs, a minor league baseball team of the Midwest League
- Daytona Cubs, the former name of the Daytona Tortugas, a minor league baseball team of the Florida State League
- Arizona Complex League Cubs, a minor league baseball team of the Arizona League
- Cub Scouts, a junior age group of the Scouting movement

== Acronyms ==
- Chinese University Basketball Super League (CUBS), former Chinese basketball league
- Coventry University Business School in the United Kingdom

== See also ==
- Cub (disambiguation)
