= Rajpuri, Mawal =

Village in Maharashtra

Rajpuri
- Village
- Location in Maharashtra, India Rajpuri (India)
- Coordinates: 18.7727651°N 73.6388951°E
- Country: India
- State: Maharashtra
- District: Pune
- Tehsil: Mawal

Government
  - Type: Panchayati Raj
  - Body: Gram panchayat

Area
  - Total: 418.02 ha (1,032.9 acres)

Population (2011)
  - Total: 837
  - Density: 200/km^{2} (519/sq mi)
- Sex ratio 432 / 405 ♂/♀

Languages
  - Official: Marathi
  - Other spoken: Hindi
- Time zone: UTC+5:30 (IST)
- Pin code: 410507
- Telephone code: 02114
- ISO 3166 code: IN-MH
- Vehicle registration: MH-14
- Website: pune.nic.in

Rajpuri is a village in India, situated in the Mawal taluka of Pune district in the state of Maharashtra. It encompasses an area of 418.02 ha (1,033 acres).

== Administration ==
The village is administrated by a sarpanch, an elected representative who leads a gram panchayat. At the time of the 2011 Census of India, the gram panchayat governed three villages and was based at Ambi.

== Demographics ==
At the 2011 census, the village comprised 155 households. The population of 837 was split between 432 males and 405 females.

== See also ==
- List of villages in Mawal taluka
