= Bajaj Chetak =

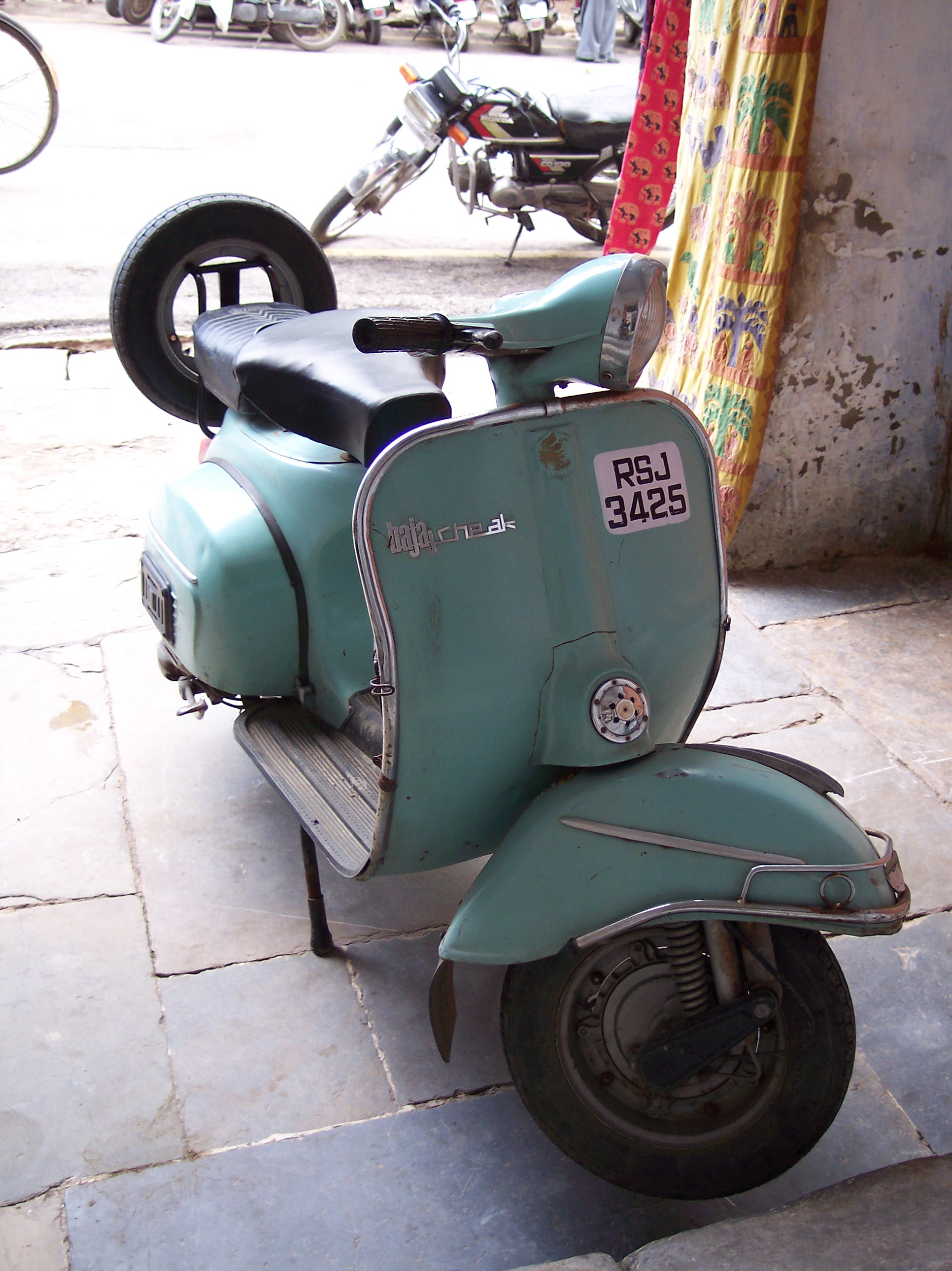
- Early 1970s Bajaj Chetak scooter
- Manufacturer: Bajaj Auto
- Production: 1972–2006 (petrol model)
- Predecessor: Vespa 150/Bajaj 150
- Successor: Bajaj Chetak Electric (2019—Present)
- Class: Scooter
- Engine: 150 cc two-stroke (before 2002); 110 cc four-stroke (2002–2006)
- Top speed: 85 km/h (Petrol); 69 km/h (Electric)
- Power: 7.5 BHP @ 5500 rpm
- Torque: 10.8 NM @ 3500 rpm
- Transmission: 4-speed manual with the shifter in the left-hand grip (1972–2006)
- Suspension: Swingarm
- Brakes: Drum
- Tires: 3.50-10
- Wheelbase: 1230 mm
- Dimensions: L: 1770 mm W: 670 mm H: 1080mm
- Fuel consumption: 75 km/L (210 mpg_{‑imp}; 180 mpg_{‑US})
- Related: Bajaj Legend, Bajaj Classic, Bajaj Bravo

The Bajaj Chetak is a motor scooter produced by the Indian company Bajaj Auto. Past models were petrol powered (either 2 or 4-stroke). The modern version is electric (known as the Chetak Electric), powered by a 4.2 kW BLDC motor with a 2.89 kWh lithium-ion battery pack, and comes with a 90 km range.

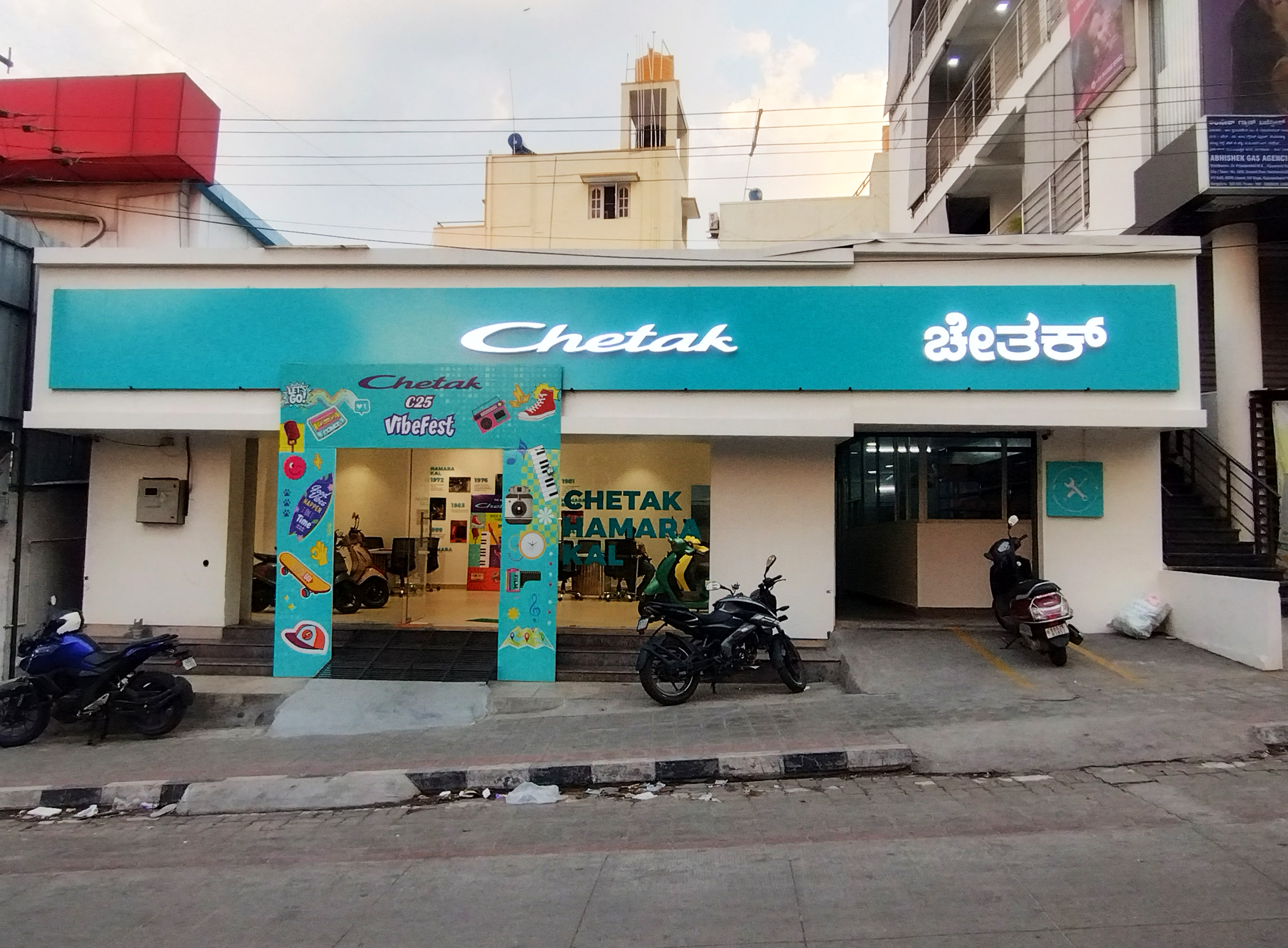
A Chetak store at RR Nagar, Bangalore (2026)

== History ==
Named after Chetak, the horse of the Indian warrior Maharana Pratap, the scooter was originally an unofficial continuation of Bajaj's official Indian production of the Italian Vespa Sprint 2-stroke scooter.

The Vespa Sprint design was licensed by Indian manufacturers Bajaj Auto from Vespa owners, Piaggio, in the 1960s, and was sold under the "Vespa 150" name. In 1971, Piaggio's license was not renewed due to changes in foreign ownership rules, which favoured Indian control over foreign brands. When the licence expired, Bajaj lost the right to use the Vespa name, but not the ability to manufacture scooters using the knowledge and tooling it had already lawfully acquired. Bajaj continued to produce scooters based on the Vespa design, most notably the Chetak.

It was an affordable and popular means of transportation for Indian urban upper-middle-class families, marketed under the tagline Hamara Bajaj (Our Bajaj). There was a prolonged waiting period between placing an order and taking delivery of a Chetak – at one point, the waiting period was 10 years.

The Chetak was generally considered a durable scooter. But it had one known issue; after stopping, the scooter had to be tilted to the right side to feed fuel mixture into the carburettor.

Like the Vespa Sprint, the Chetek's rear suspension is a swingarm consisting of the integrated engine and gearbox unit, and its front suspension is a single-sided trailing link. The wheels are interchangeable between the front and rear hubs, due to the single-sided suspension design. Also like the Vespa Sprint, the Chetek has an offset engine layout with the engine and gearbox unit on the right-hand side of the rear wheel.

Around 1980, the Vespa-licensed design was replaced with an all-new in-house design that heavily shared the same general appearance and style (with only the nosecone and indicators being the obvious significant difference). In 2002 a 4-stroke model (Chetak 4S) was introduced to improve emission levels and fuel efficiency, using an engine designed and built in-house by Bajaj.

During its heyday, its chief competitor was LML NV made by LML India as a licensed copy of the Vespa PX 150. In the face of rising competition from bikes and cars, Chetak lost ground in India, and production was discontinued in 2005 as Bajaj Auto stopped manufacturing scooters altogether and shifted its production to motorcycles instead (though sales of existing scooter stocks continued into at least 2006).

Bajaj Chetak scooters
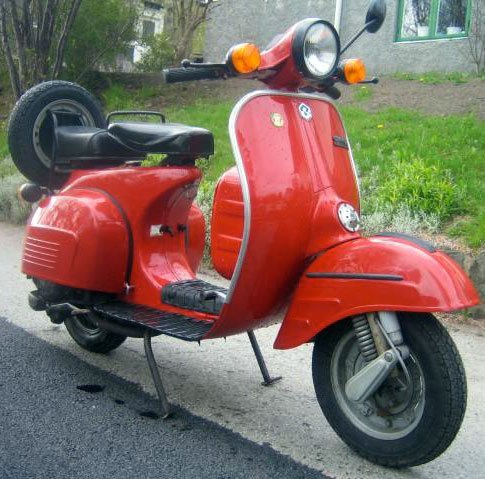
Later 1970s Bajaj Chetak (pre-redesign)

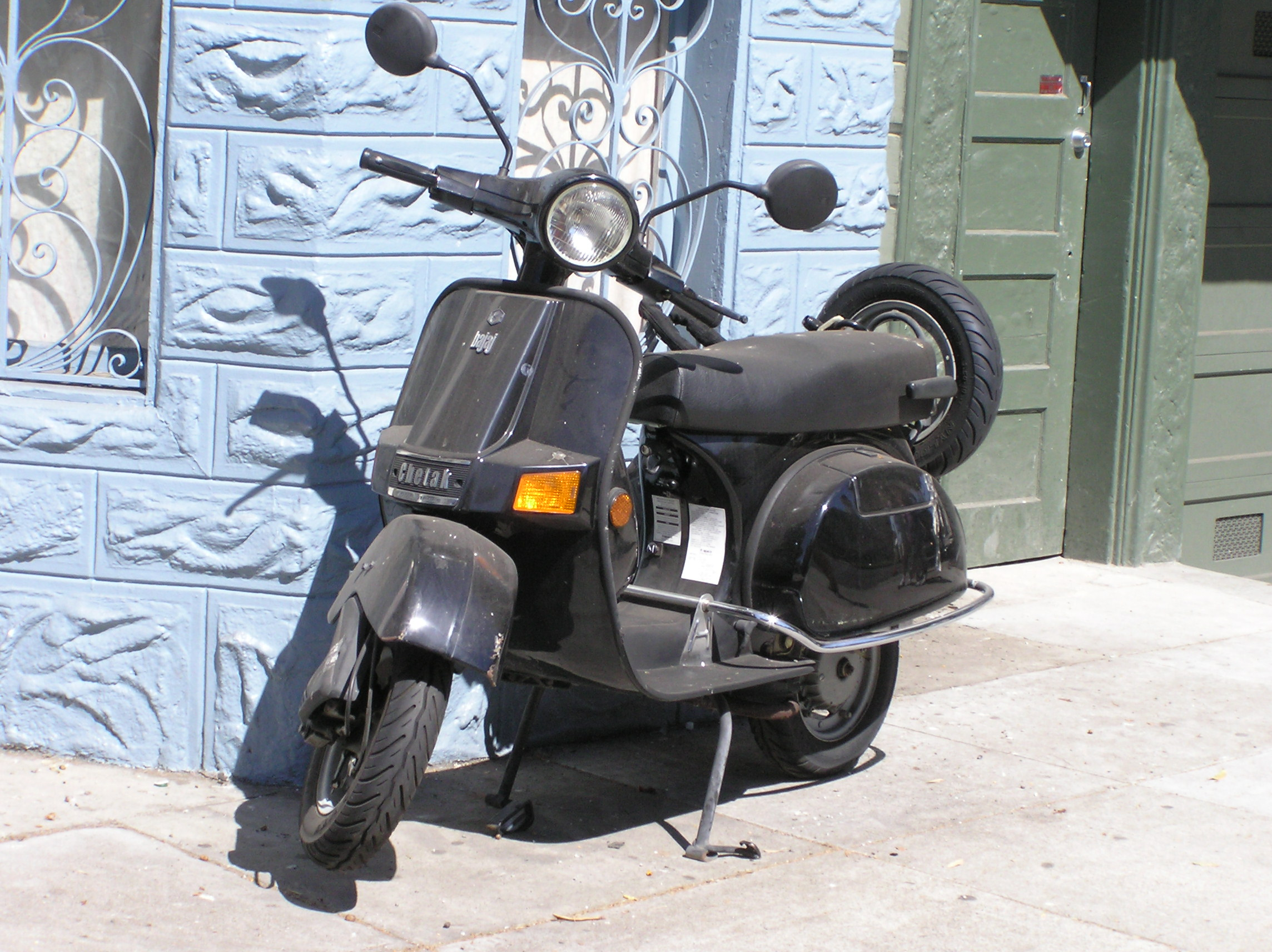
2000s Bajaj Chetak (post-redesign)
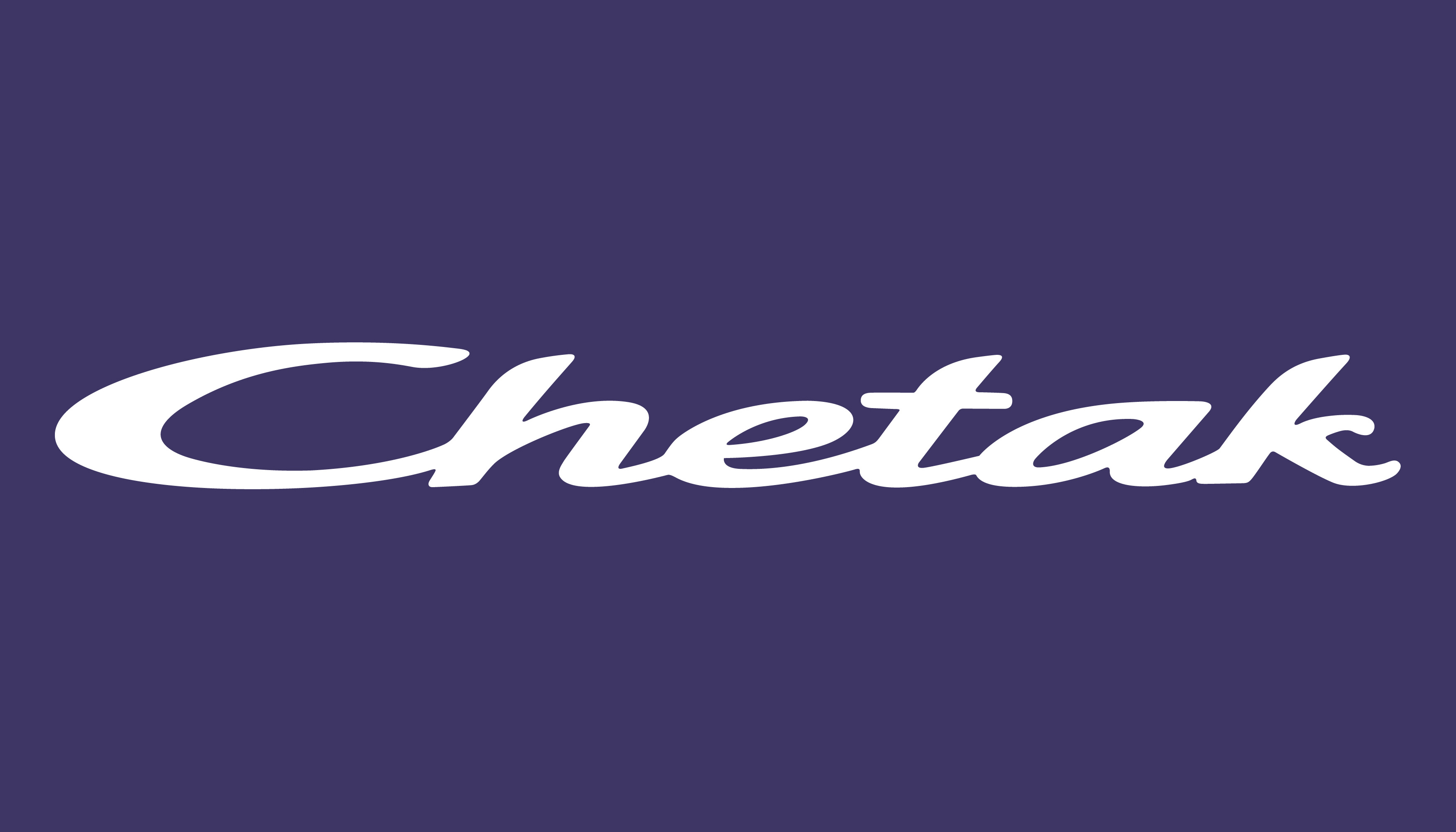
Bajaj Chetak logos (new (left), old (right))

== Chetak Electric ==
Bajaj Chetak Electric
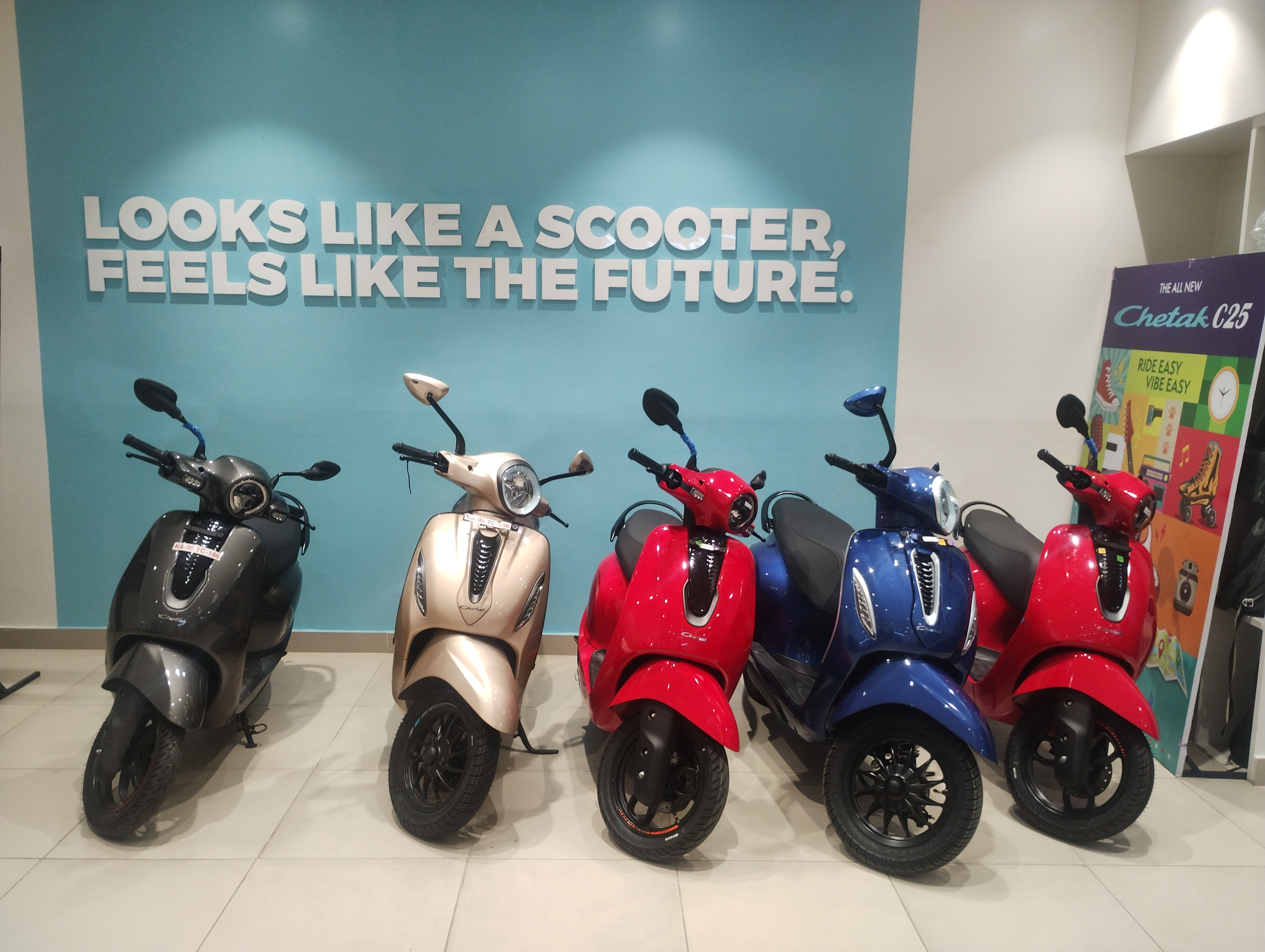
- Chetak electric scooters (2026)
- Manufacturer: Bajaj Auto
- Production: 2019―present
- Class: Electric scooter
- Engine: 4 kW BLDC electric motor
- Top speed: 60 km/h (37 mph)
- Transmission: Automatic
- Suspension: front: single-sided trailing arm rear: single shock absorber
- Brakes: Disc, Drum
- Tires: Tubeless 12 inch
- Range: 95 km (59 mi)/charge

On 16 October 2019, Bajaj Auto unveiled a new electric version of their Chetak scooter under the Urbanite EV brand, with an all-metal body and retro-inspired styling.

Production started on September 25, 2019, at the Chakan plant of Bajaj Auto. It was initially launched in Pune (4 dealerships) and Bangalore (13 dealerships) in January 2020 and was sold through select KTM dealerships.

Chetak Technology Ltd inaugurated their newly built EV manufacturing plant at Pune's Akurdi on the birth anniversary of Rahul Bajaj in October 2019. The plant has a capacity to manufacture 500,000 electric two-wheelers per annum.

As of 2023, the scooter is being sold in 100 cities and has 40+ stores serving as exclusive Experience Centres.

== Other variants ==
Urbane

The original Urbane variant came with a drum brake setup at the rear and is available in two colour options. The variant is now discontinued.

== See also ==
- Plug-in electric vehicles in India
