= Vespa Sprint =

Vespa Sprint (VLB)
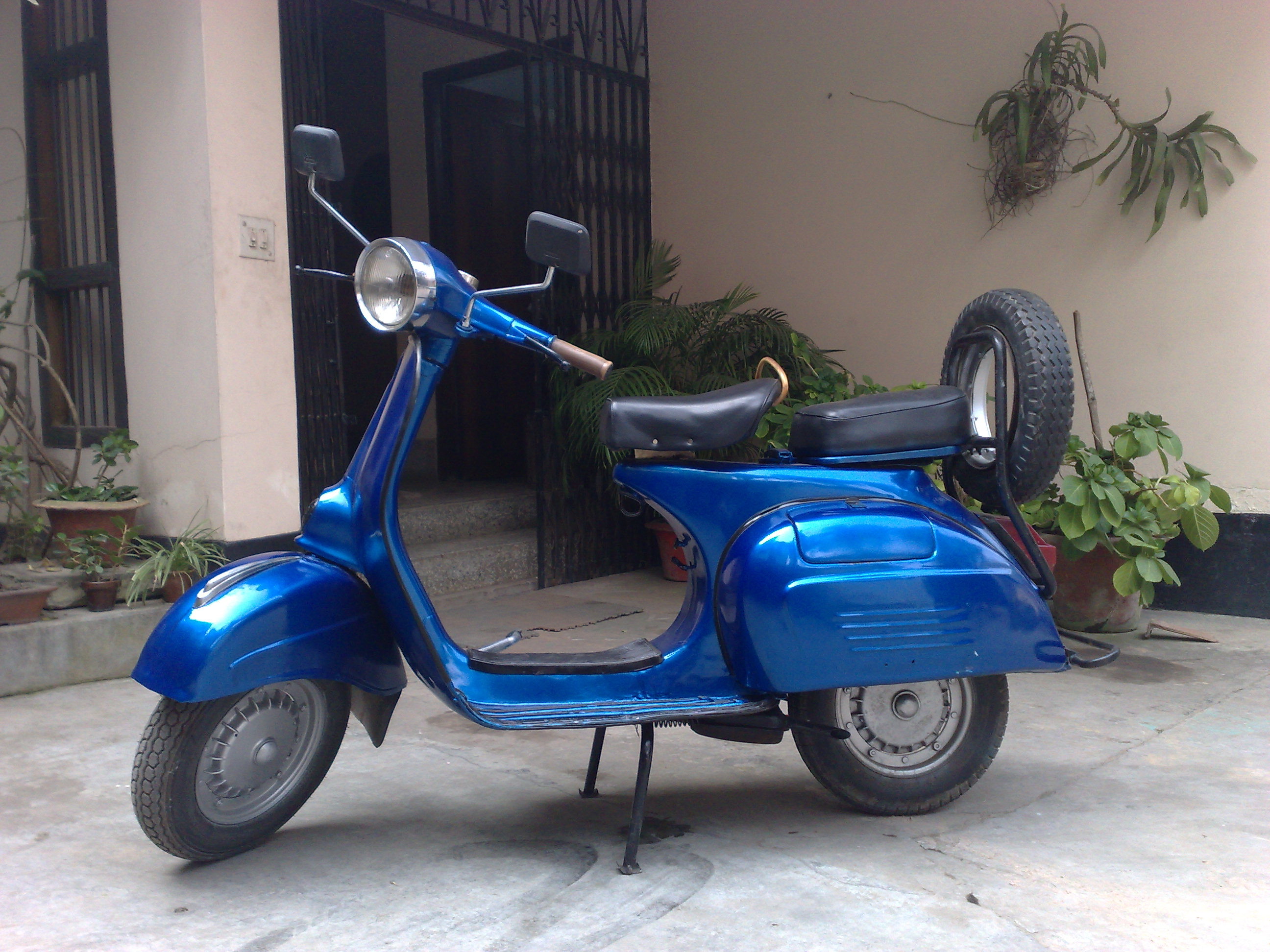
- Manufacturer: Piaggio
- Parent company: Piaggio
- Production: 1965 to 1976
- Predecessor: Vespa GL 150 (VLA)
- Successor: Vespa PX150 (VLX)
- Class: Scooter
- Engine: 145.45 cc, 2 Stroke, Single Cylinder, Air Cooled (rotatory valve)
- Compression ratio: Sprint 7.5:1 and Sprint Veloce 7.7:1
- Ignition type: Coil (CB Point)
- Transmission: 4-speed, Manual (Left hand gear and clutch)
- Frame type: None
- Suspension: mono (front and rear)
- Brakes: Front and rear drum
- Tires: 10 inch
- Wheelbase: 1200 mm
- Weight: 89 kg (dry)
- Fuel capacity: 7.7 liter (1.4 liter reserve)
- Oil capacity: N/A (manual Pre-mixing with fuel)
- Turning radius: 1400 mm

Vespa Sprint is a 150cc, 2 stroke scooter made by Piaggio from 1965 to 1976.

The scooter came in two different versions. Early models, called the Vespa Sprint, were made until 1974. Later models, called the Vespa Sprint Veloce, were made from 1969 to 1979. The big update with the Sprint Veloce was in the engine. The design was altered from the old two port design with the addition of a third transfer port on the top end. The compression ratio was again increased the Sprint's 7.5:1 to 7.7:1.

Originally the model lacked turn signals. However, all Sprint Veloce models imported to the U.S. after 1973 had turn signals fitted as standard equipment in order to satisfy American regulations.

In India, Bajaj Auto used the 150 Sprint design to replace their license-built Vespa 150 Super model (sold as "Vespa 150"), with the 10-inch wheeled Bajaj Chetak model in 1972.
