= Bajaj Cub =

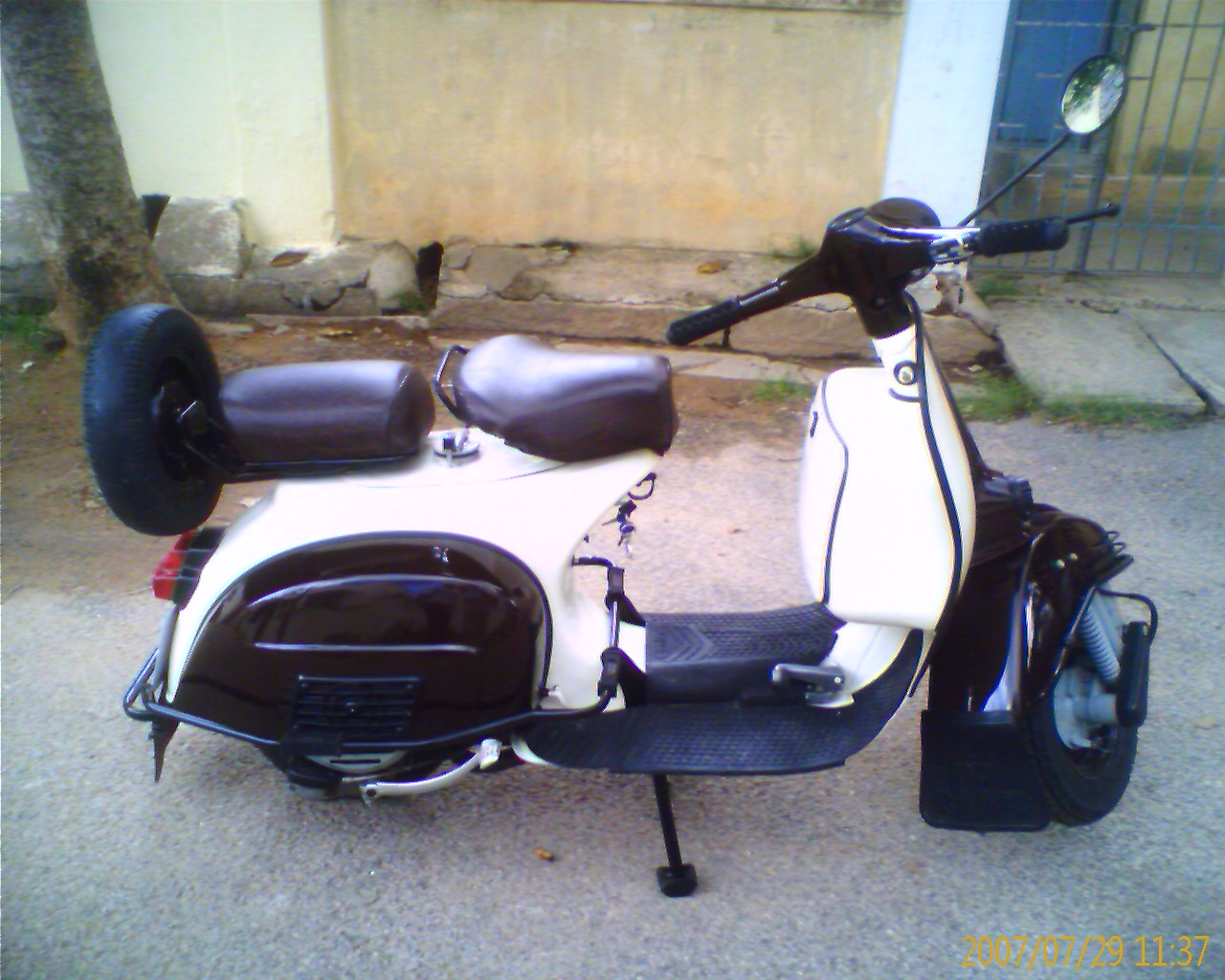
- Manufacturer: Bajaj Auto
- Production: 1987–1992
- Class: Scooter
- Engine: 100 cc (6.1 cu in) single-cylinder
- Top speed: 70 km/h (43 mph)
- Transmission: 3-speed manual with shifter in the left-hand grip
- Brakes: Drum
- Tires: 3.50-8
- Weight: 95 kg (209 lb) (dry)
- Fuel capacity: 6 L (1.3 imp gal; 1.6 US gal)

The Bajaj Cub was a limited edition release motor scooter from Indian manufacturer Bajaj Auto. A suitable electronic ignition system for scooters was developed and introduced on Bajaj Cub. It was released in 1987 and was quite quickly discontinued. It usually came with a detachable single footrest but an all-round foot-rest was optional. With good maintenance, it gave a mileage of 40 km/L on roads.

This model was discontinued due to the success of its higher powered 4 speed, 150cc model, Bajaj Chetak. The Cub had a 100cc engine, and a smaller wheel diameter compared to the Chetak. The Chetak's bigger engine gave it better pick-up but a lower mileage of fuel.

It was priced at around INR 9500 approx. (190.550 US$) at the time of its release. In 1991 it costed INR 19000 on road price Bangalore.
