= Ambi, Mawal =

Village in Maharashtra

Ambi
- Village
- Location in Maharashtra, India Ambi (India)
- Coordinates: 18.760088°N 73.677181°E
- Country: India
- State: Maharashtra
- District: Pune
- Tehsil: Mawal

Government
  - Type: Panchayati Raj
  - Body: Gram panchayat

Area
  - Total: 819 ha (2,020 acres)

Population (2011)
  - Total: 2,328
  - Density: 284/km^{2} (736/sq mi)
- Sex ratio 1228/1100 ♂/♀

Languages
  - Official: Marathi
  - Other spoken: Hindi
- Time zone: UTC+5:30 (IST)
- Pin code: 410405
- Telephone code: 02114
- ISO 3166 code: IN-MH
- Vehicle registration: MH-14
- Website: pune.nic.in

Ambi is a village and gram panchayat in India, situated in Mawal taluka of Pune district in the state of Maharashtra. It encompasses an area of 819 ha (2,024 acres).

== Administration ==
The village is administrated by a sarpanch, an elected representative who leads a gram panchayat. At the time of the 2011 Census of India, the village was the headquarters for the eponymous gram panchayat, which also governed the villages of Akurdi and Rajpuri.

== Demographics ==
At the 2011 census, the village comprised 473 households. The population of 2328 was split between 1228 males and 1100 females.

== See also ==
- List of villages in Mawal taluka
