= Bajaj Spirit =

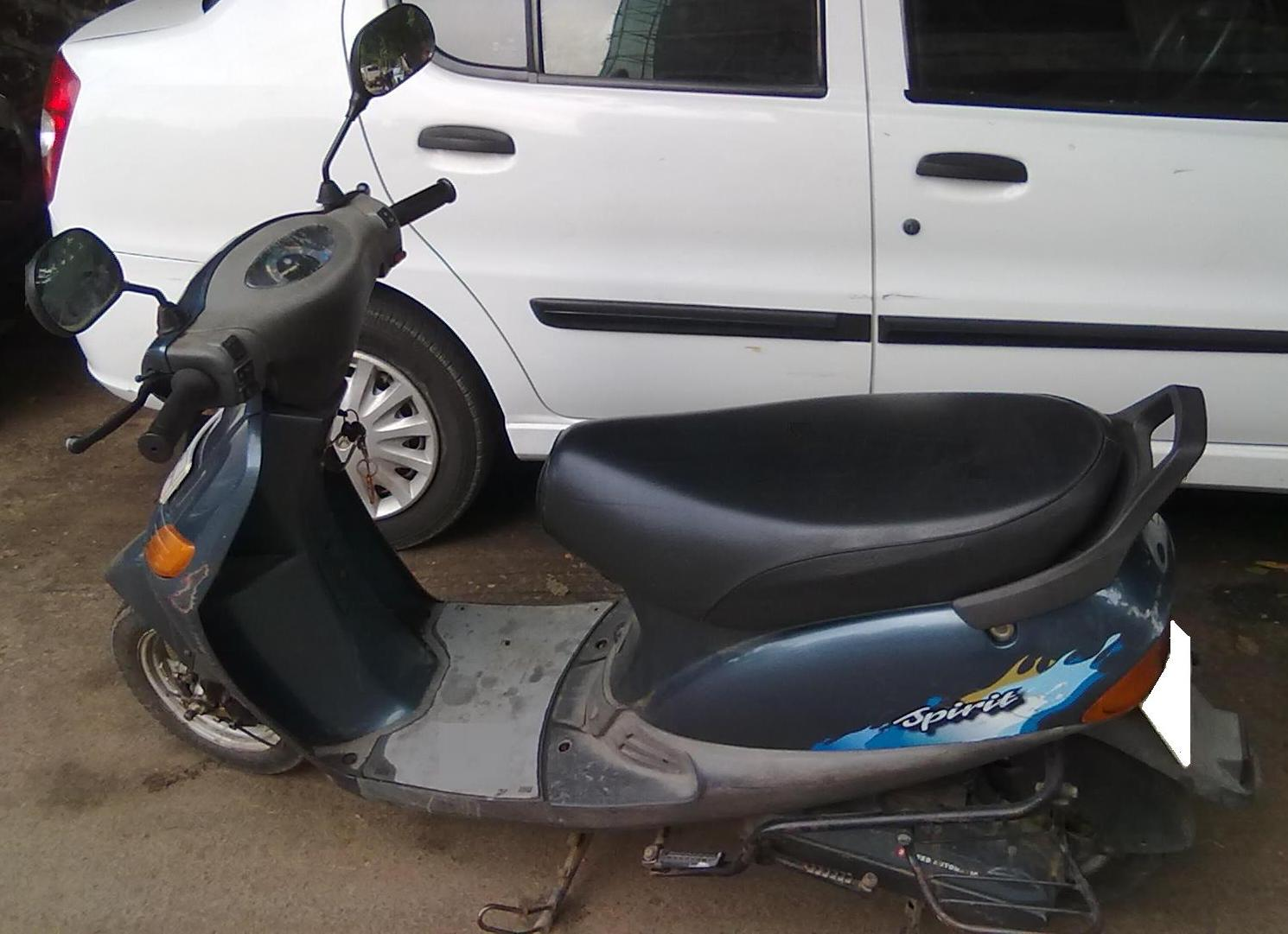
- Manufacturer: Bajaj
- Predecessor: Sunny
- Class: scooterette
- Engine: 59.86 cc Two-Stroke single cylinder engine Bore = 42.6 mm Stroke = 42 mm
- Power: 3.6PS @ 6500 rpm
- Torque: 4.32NM @5500 rpm
- Transmission: 2 speed automatic
- Brakes: drum brakes both front and rear
- Weight: 76 kg (dry)
- Fuel capacity: 3.5L Reserve = 0.7 L

Spirit is a scooterette manufactured in India by Bajaj Auto, a motorised vehicle manufacturing company. It is powered by a two-stroke, 60 cc, single-cylinder, air-cooled engine. It has a two-speed automatic transmission, with kick/electrically started ignition. It was launched in 1999, "targeted at the youth segment, Spirit is ideal for college students. As it is light in weight, women can also ride it. The USP, of course, is its two-speed automatic transmission" is how it is described by The Financial Express quoting Bajaj officials. Naushad Forbes et al. consider it as being launched in January 2000. Spirit was one of the eighteen models Bajaj Auto launched in eighteen months "...after eighteen years with one model..." as its president is quoted saying.

== Features ==
Bajaj Spirit has 60 cc two stroke all aluminium engine. Superior gradeability to take on steep terrain with ease. Anti-dive system for more effective and safe braking. International styling with clean rounded contours. Unique 2 speed automatic gear transmission for enhanced performance. Front suspension with hydraulic dampers for the most comfortable ride. Softer rear suspension for superior comfort for the pillion rider as well. Easy electric start. Convenient turning radius for easy maneuverability to weave in and out of city traffic. Bajaj Spirit was Priced around Rs. 27000/- Approx. It has 2 versions earlier one with a rectangular headlamp and the later one with a smiling headlamp. Mileage of this vehicle is expected to be near 35 - 43Kmpl.

== Awards ==
Bajaj Spirit won the best scooter and the best indigenous vehicle from Overdrive a Network 18 media venture in 2000, the award citation described it as "perky little Bajaj Spirit... a small-sized, sleek look commuter with a big heart... Probably the best styled machine along with superbly engineered mechanicals, the Bajaj Spirit shows what Indian ingenuity can do... Highly reliable, quite frugal and strong performance... in Indian traffic conditions"
