= Cub (nickname) =

Cub is a nickname of:

- Cub Buck (1892–1966), American football player and coach
- Cub Koda (1948–2000), American musician
- Cub Stricker (1859–1937), American baseball player
- Cub Swanson (born 1983), American mixed martial artist
