= Bajaj Discover =

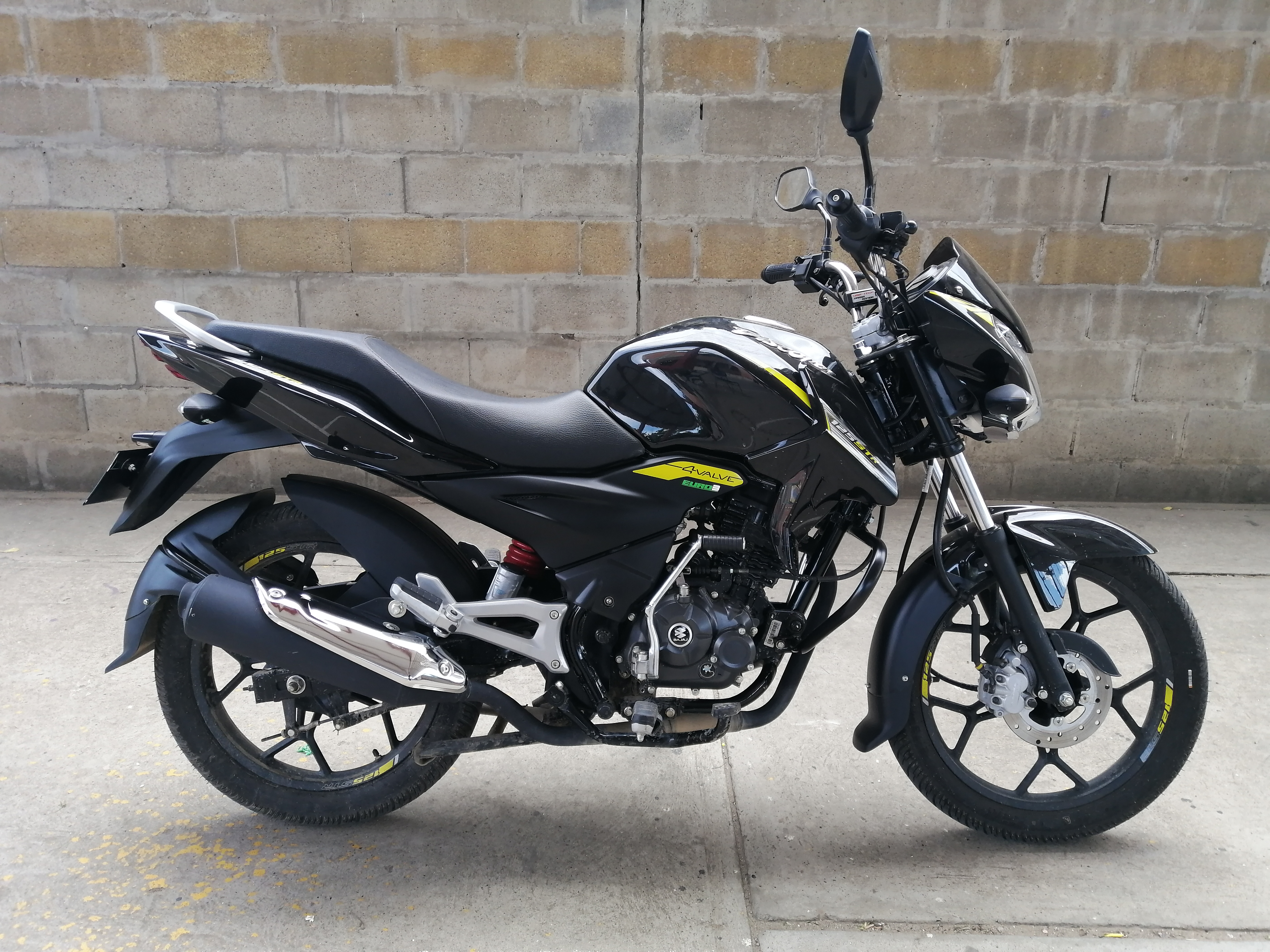
- Bajaj Discover
- Manufacturer: Bajaj Auto
- Production: 2004–2020
- Predecessor: Kawasaki KB100 RTZ
- Successor: Bajaj Pulsar 125
- Class: Commuter
- Engine: 94.4 cc (5.76 cu in), 115 cc (7.0 cu in), 125 cc (7.6 cu in), 135 cc (8.2 cu in) and 144.8 cc (8.84 cu in) air-cooled, four-stroke cycle, single
- Transmission: 5-Speed manual
- Suspension: Front; telescopic, wheel travel 130 mm stroke Rear Nitrox, wheel travel 110 mm wheel travel
- Brakes: Front 240 mm disc Rear 130mm drum
- Tires: 17"
- Wheelbase: 1,305 mm (51.4 in)
- Fuel capacity: 12 L (2.6 imp gal; 3.2 US gal)

The Bajaj Discover was a line of commuter motorcycles manufactured by Bajaj Auto. The bike, initially launched in the year 2004, had been a success in the Indian two wheeler segment until it was discontinued in 2020 due to too many models being introduced under the Discover brand which led to poor sales. It was replaced by Bajaj Pulsar 125.

== History ==
The first variant of Discover was launched in 2004. The bike had an engine capacity of 125 cc. A 112 cc variant was launched in December 2005. The bike was claimed to have a mileage of 101 km/L (290 mpg_{‑imp}; 240 mpg_{‑US}). In 2007, a 135 cc variant was launched.

The Discover was the second Bajaj bike (After the Pulsar segment) to come with the six-spoke alloys and the patented "Exhaus-TEC"—basically a resonator that boosts torque at lower rpms. It also employed the Bajaj trademark "DTS-i" Digital Twin Spark Ignition Technology used in the Bajaj Pulsar 150 and 180 DTS-i.

At launch, four variants were available:

- Spoke wheels, Drum brake, Kickstart, Round Headlamp
- Spoke wheels, Drum brake, Kickstart, Fairing
- Spoke wheels, Drum brake, Selfstart, Fairing
- Alloy wheels, Disc brake, Selfstart, Fairing, Tachometer

However, in mid-2005, the Discover was made a single variant model. It was revamped with new graphics, black grab-rail, SNS (Spring in spring) suspension, 130 mm drum brakes, six-spoke alloys as standard, self-start, and some engine tweaks predominantly aimed at reducing friction and combustion roar.

A 135 cc model was launched in 2007, which features a front disc brake, self-start, nitrox suspension, and black alloy wheels. The silver engine has also been powder-coated black in the 135 cc variant. This version also introduced an analogue tachometer in the dashboard.

A 100 cc version was launched in 2009 with a DTS-Si engine. After the success of the Discover 100, Bajaj launched a 150 cc version and stopped production of the 135 cc variant. The 125 cc variant was re-launched in 2011.

A new variant, the 125ST, featuring an entirely new body design and graphics, was launched in 2012. Three new models based on the same design of the 125ST- 100 T, 100M and 125 T powered by the world's first 4 valve twin spark - DTSi engine were launched in 2013. The 100M is launched with the tagline "Mileage ka naya satya" (new truth of mileage), the company claimed 84 km/L, it's a 102cc bike. with 95 km/h max. speed, 4 valve Engine.

In 2014, two 150 cc variants of the Discover were launched, the 150S and 150F. Both models were based on the 125ST styling, except for the fact that the 150S was a naked version and the 150F featured a sporty body fairing. Both variants were powered by the 150cc 4-valve DTS-i engine reminiscent of the 125ST engine. The bikes were designed mainly for the commuter market, but with a twist of sporty design trends of sports bike feel that customers could afford to buy.

In 2019, Bajaj reverted to the traditional Discover design, launching the 125cc version of the same and featuring an analogue tachometer, while delivering performance like its older 125cc counterpart.

The Discover lineup of bikes was eventually discontinued in March 2020. The main reason for this was that Bajaj had launched way too many Discovers, and to make the new model popular, they kept discontinuing older models silently. This made customers lose faith in the brand, while existing owners became angry over having bought a model that was discontinued abruptly. Also, new positioning under the same Discover label gave mixed signals and left buyers confused. This led to lower sales and subsequent discontinuation.

=== Model ===
- Discover 100
- Discover 100T
- Discover 100M
- Discover 110
- Discover 125
- Discover 125T
- Discover 125ST
- Discover 135 (Type 1 & 2)
- Discover 150
- Discover 150S
- Discover 150F

== Technical specifications ==
Specifications	Discover 100 DTS-i/100 M/100 T	Discover 110 DTS-i	Discover 125 DTS-i (Standard Model)	Discover 125 ST/125 T/125 M	Discover 135 DTS-i	Discover 150 DTS-i/150 S/150 F
Displacement (cc)	94.38	115.5	124.6	124.6	134.21	144.8
Power (bhp)	7.7 (Standard); 10 (T & M models)	8.6	11	12.8	12.8	14.3
Torque(Nm)	7.85 (Standard); 9 (T & M models)	9.81	10.8	11	11.88	12.7
Engine Type	DTS-i	DTS-i	DTS-i	DTS-i	DTS-i	DTS-i
Wheelbase (mm)	1305	1305	1305	1305	1305	1305
Kerb Weight (kg)	115 (Standard); 121 (T & M models)	117	118.5	121	133	121 (Standard); 130 (S & F models)
