= Bajaj Sunny =

Sunny
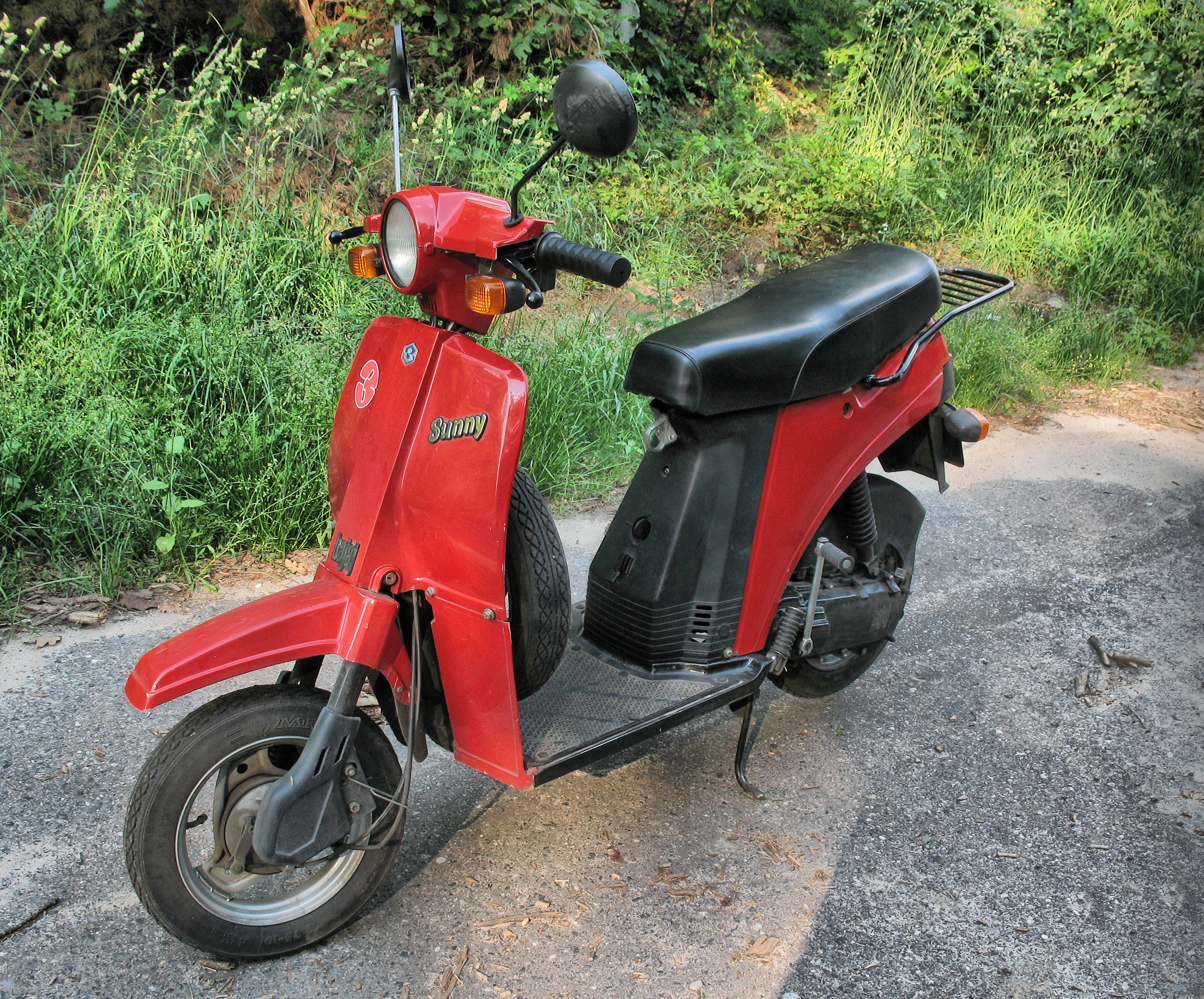
- Manufacturer: Bajaj
- Production: 1990-2000
- Predecessor: None
- Successor: Sunny Zip
- Class: Scooter
- Engine: 50 cc
- Top speed: 50 km/h (31 mph)
- Power: 2.8 bhp @ 6000 rpm
- Transmission: single gear (automatically engaging)
- Suspension: Front: Leading link with Coil springs Rear: Hydraulic damper with coaxial springs
- Brakes: Drum F/R
- Tires: 2.75 x 10 F/R
- Wheelbase: 1,165mm
- Weight: 63kg (dry)
- Fuel capacity: 3.5 L (0.77 imp gal; 0.92 US gal)

The Bajaj Sunny was a scooter produced and sold by Bajaj Auto in India. Bajaj Auto no longer produces this vehicle. It had a 50cc engine and a maximum speed of 50 km/h. It could carry a payload of up to 120 kg. It had a fuel tank capacity of 3.5 liters. Like most scooterettes, the Sunny was targeted at teenagers who were eligible to get a driving license for ungeared two-wheelers at 16 years of age.

The Sunny was a successful scooterette at that time. Bajaj stopped producing it in 2000. The Sunny Zip had a 60 cc engine and had a marginal power increase from its former model. The Sunny was a reliable two wheeler, and its two stroke engine offered a mileage of nearly 50 kms/litre. Riding comfort was good and it was quite handsome in appearance. It had a single gear (automatically engaging) system, unlike the variomatic transmission used in the Kinetic moped or scooters then, or the TVS Scootys now. Overall it was considered a very fine scooterette even for an aged person.
