= Suzuki Intruder =

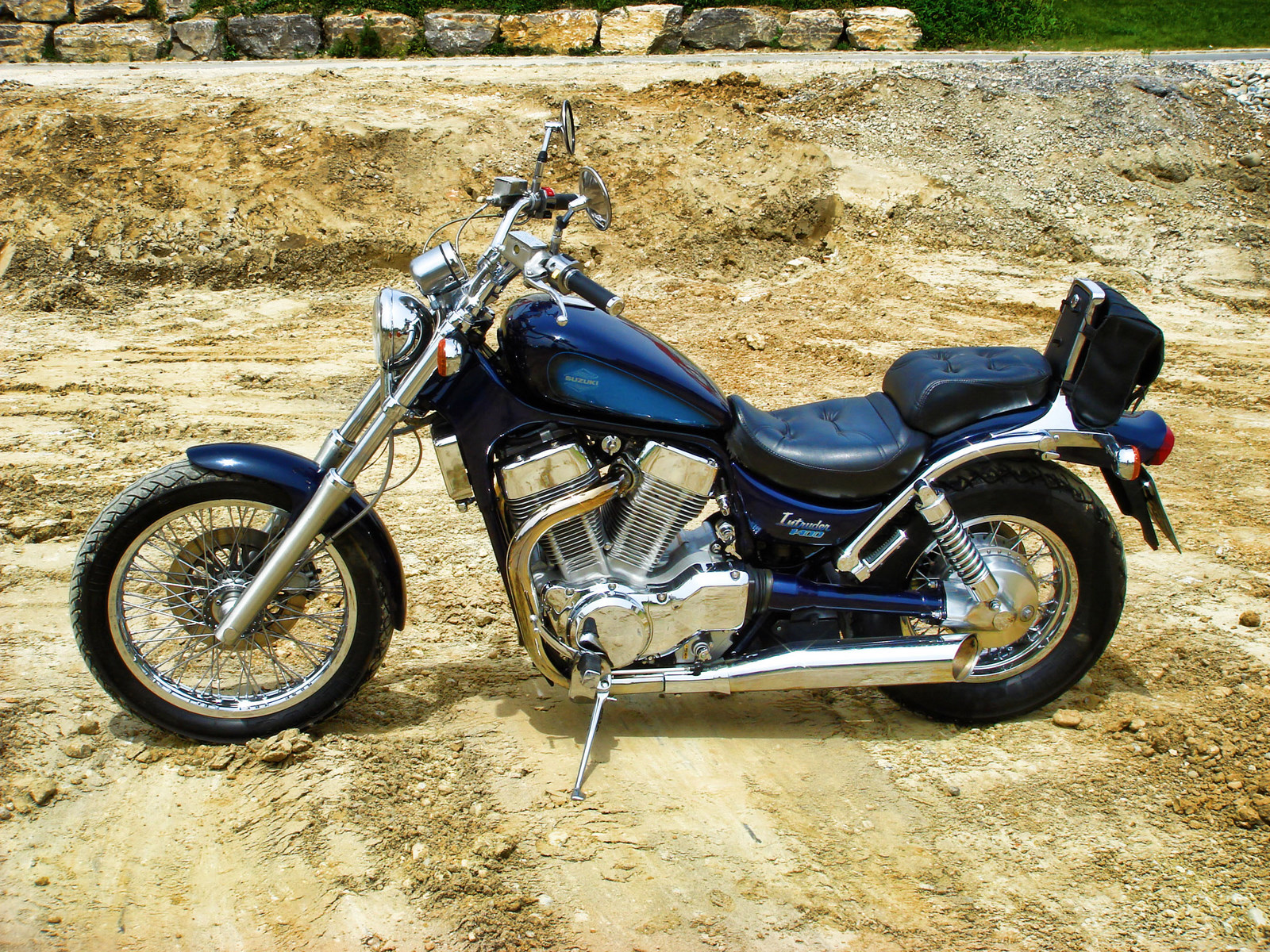
- VS 1400 Intruder
- Manufacturer: Suzuki
- Also called: VS
- Production: 1985–2005
- Successor: Boulevard
- Class: Cruiser
- Engine: 4-stroke V-twin

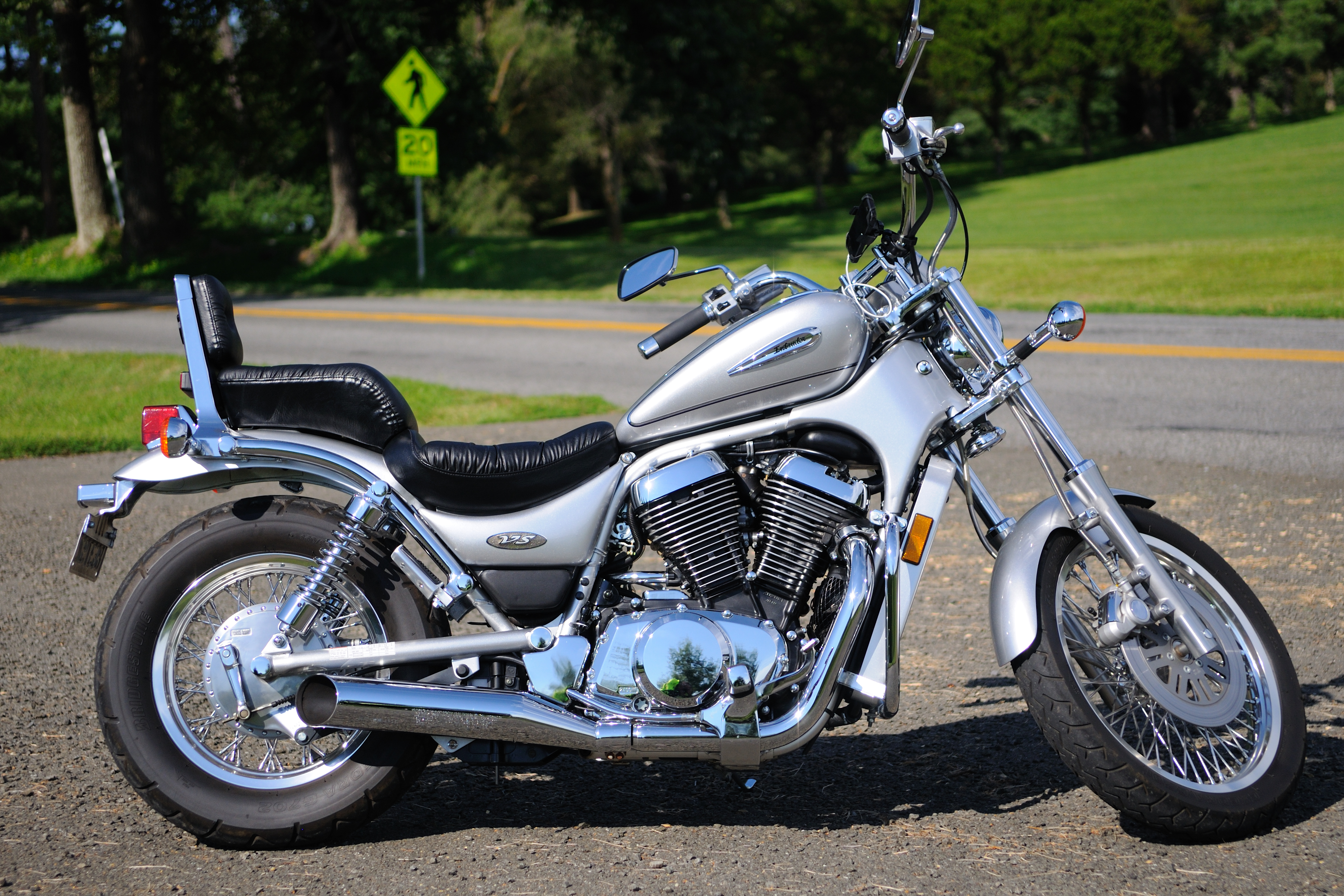
2003 VS 800 Intruder

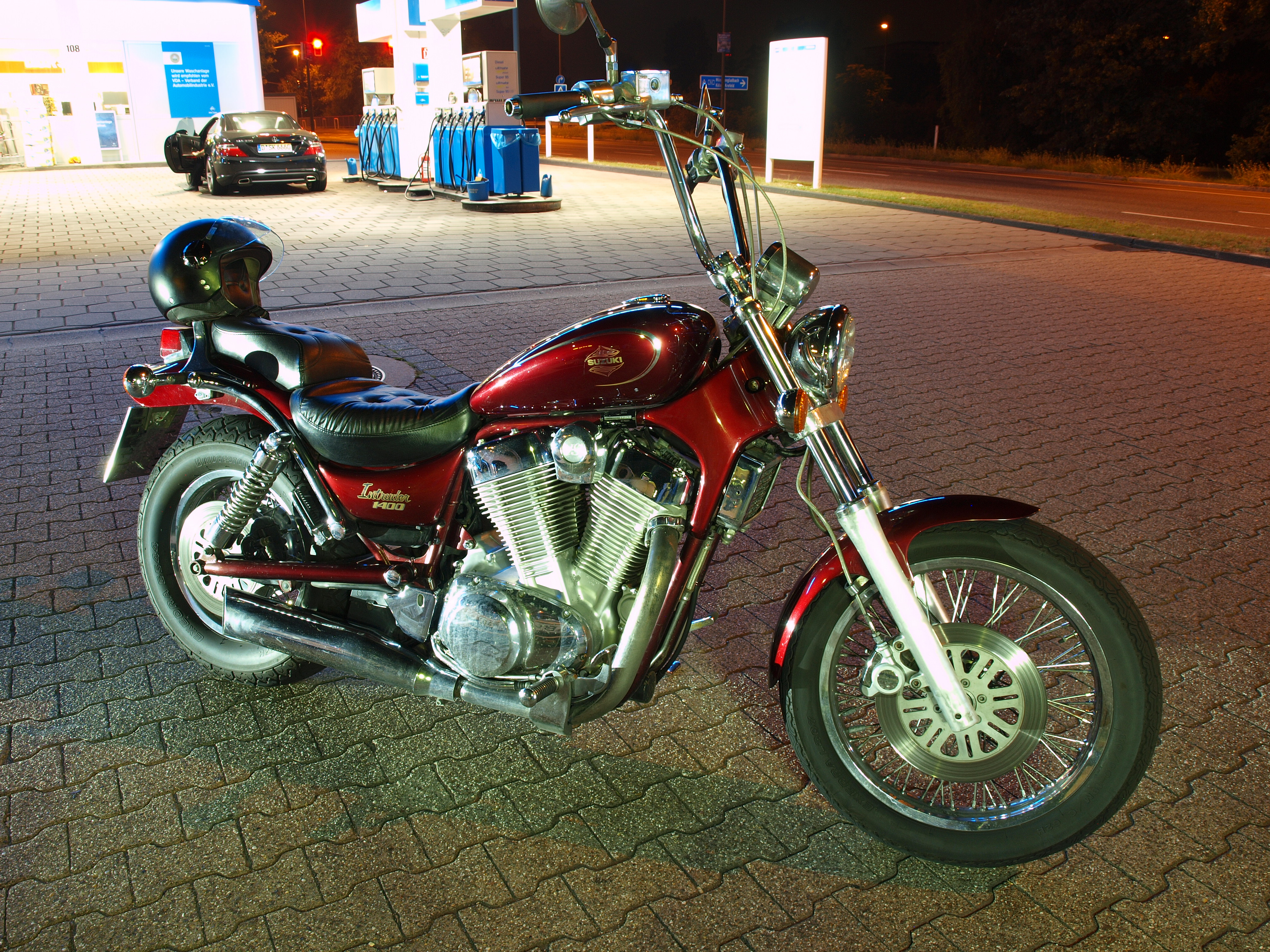
VS 1400 Intruder

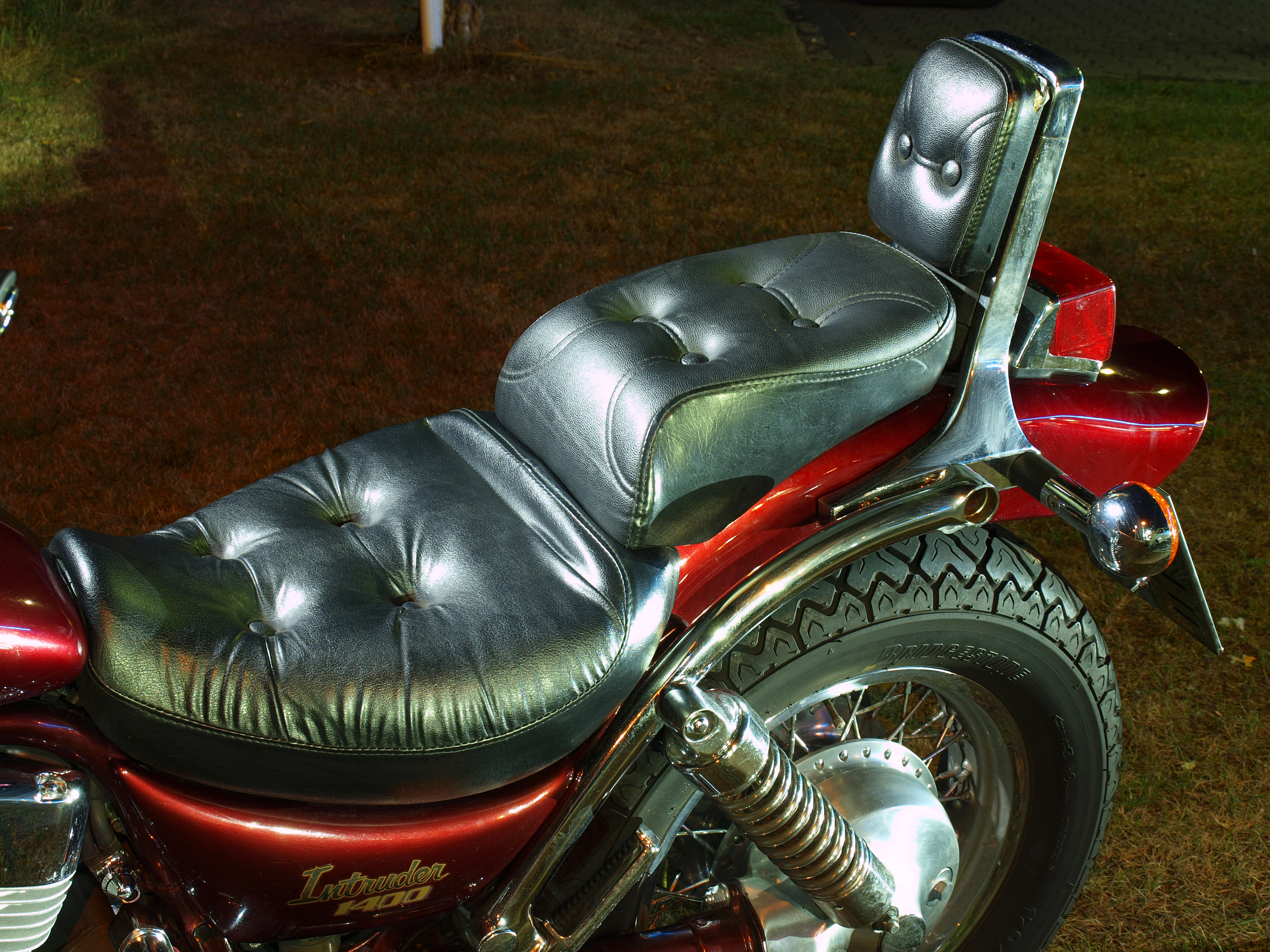
VS 1400 Seats

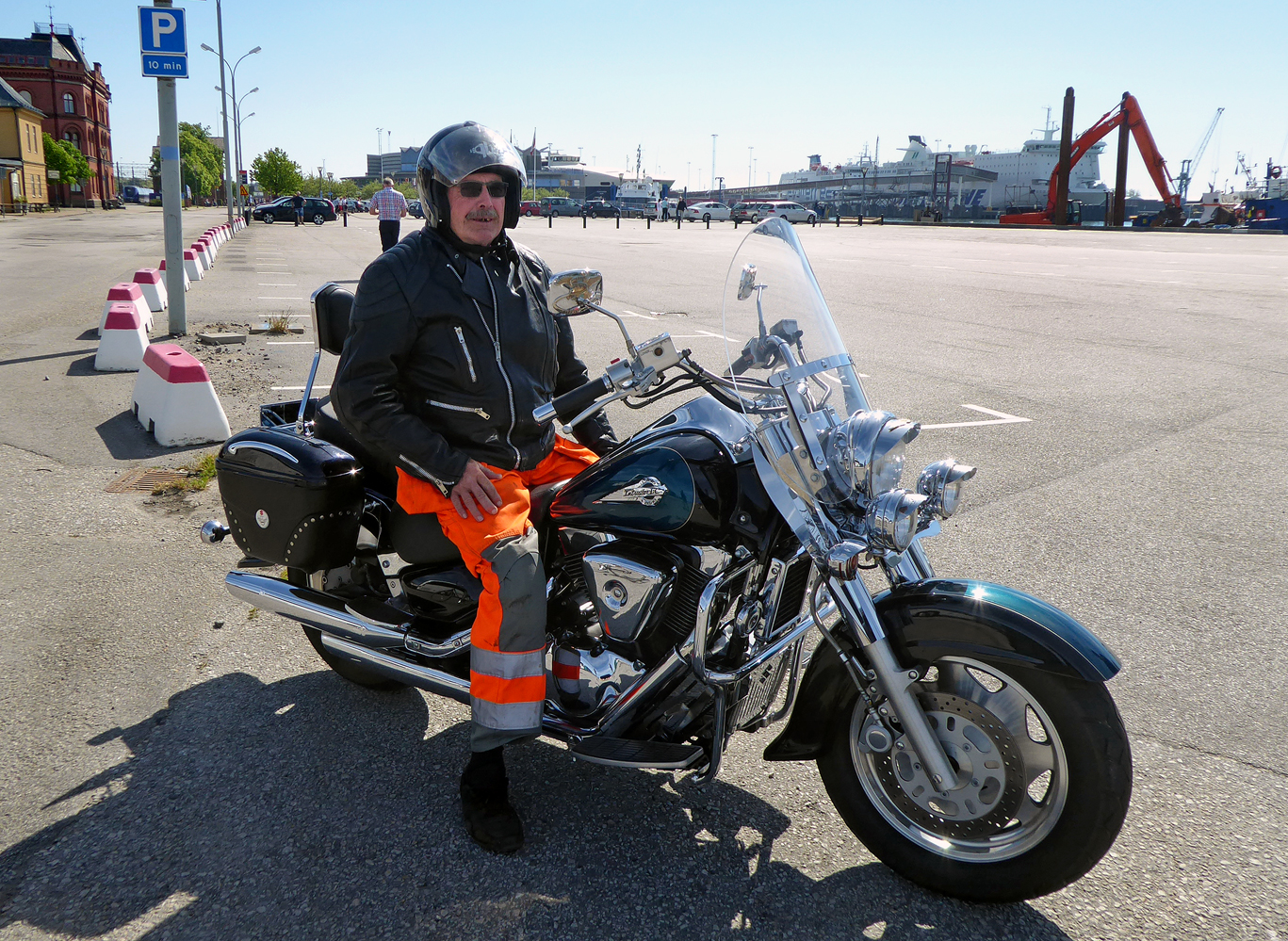
A man on his Suzuki VL 1500 Intruder LC. Ystad Port 2017

A Suzuki Intruder variant in Benglauru (2026)

The Suzuki Intruder is a series of cruiser motorcycles made by Suzuki from 1985 to 2005. After 2005, the Intruder lineup was replaced by the Boulevard range. In Europe, the Intruder name remains in use on certain models. The VS Intruder bikes all have 4-stroke V-twin engines.

The Intruder line started life in North America with the Intruder 700 and the Intruder 1400, which was actually a 1360cc machine. The smaller version was designed to be small enough to escape the projected 45% US import tariff on imported bikes, while the larger version was designed to take on the Harley 1340cc Evolution models as well as Japanese bikes like the Kawasaki Vulcan 1500.

The US tariff, when passed into law, actually set the import limit at 750 ccs instead of 700. So Suzuki soon bumped the Intruder up to be a 750, which it continued to produce until 1991.

For the 1992 model year the small Intruder became an 800 (technically an 805), with a larger engine, a larger radiator, and larger forks to go with the extra engine. The model would continue in this form until 2004, with the only change of note being that Suzuki started painting the engine black in 1999.

For the 2005 model year Suzuki decided to re-launch all their cruisers with the “Boulevard” name in an effort to make the name less off-putting to conservative American cruiser buyers. The slender, sporty VS Intruder 800 and VS1400 Intruder became the “Boulevard S50” and “Boulevard S83” respectively, their cubic centimeter names being replaced with the engine displacement in cubic inches.

Other changes to the VS800 included straighter bars with longer risers; the addition of four-way flashers; a one-piece seat; smaller turn signals; the deletion of the sissy bar; and the addition of a plastic fake air cleaner on the side of the engine (to hold the tool kit formerly stored in the sissy bar). But mechanically they are the same, and parts can be swapped between the Intruder 800 and the S50. The exception is that fake air cleaner, which screws into threaded holes in blocks cast into the cooling fins on the cylinders, which the Intruder 800 did not have.

As a side note, the VX800 standard/ naked sportbike was produced and sold in the US from 1991 to 1993. It used the same engine as the VS800 Intruder, only with a vacuum operated fuel pump instead of the Intruder's electric one. The rest of the bike is totally different, but the engines interchange.

== Family ==
The family consists of:

- Liquid-cooled:
  - VS400 399 cc (24.3 cu in) 25 kW (33 bhp)
  - VS600 568 cc (34.7 cu in) 34 kW (45 bhp) with torque produced approx 46 Nm @ 6000 rpm.
  - VS700 model for USA market between 1986 and 1987
  - VS750 The model with 747 cc (45.6 cu in) engine capacity was produced between 1985 and 1991. The engine is a four-stroke, water-cooled, OHC, 45-degree V-twin producing a maximum of 55 HP at 7,500 rpm with a compression ratio of 10:1, giving the bike a top speed of 165 km/h. Each cylinder has its own Mikuni carburetor.
  - VS800 805 cc (49.1 cu in) 37 kW (50 bhp) with torque produced approx 62,1 Nm @ 4000 rpm. This engine was also used on the Suzuki VX800 (56 hp), Sachs Roadster 800 and Sachs b-805 (58 hp) models albeit with different states of tune.
  - M1800R (M109R)
  - C1800R (C109R)
- Air/oil-cooled
  - VL125 10 kW (13 hp)
  - VL250 18 kW (24 hp)
  - VS1400 1,360 cc (83 cu in) 54 kW (72 bhp) with torque produced approx 115 Nm @ 3200 rpm. Total fuel capacity ≈ 13L (3.3 gallons). Average fuel consumption is 38-46 mpg.
  - VL1500 LC

== Transmission ==
All Suzuki Intruders are powered by either a 4 or 5 speed transmissions mated to a shaft drive which delivers power to the rear wheel. Starting in 1991, the VS1400 platform received the 5 speed transmission in most European countries. In the US, this new 5 speed transmission debuted in the 1997 models, and in 1996, Canadian models were equipped with the same transmission. The Transmission is a 5-speed, constant mesh.

However the VL250 and European VL125 model Suzuki Intruder are both 5-speed chain-driven vehicles.

== Brakes ==
The 805 cc and smaller models have front disc brakes and rear drum brake. The 1985 - 1987 models have the front brake rotor mounted on the left side, instead of the right side found on later models. Their sissy bar is also shorter. The VS1400 and LC1500 Intruders used single disc brakes on both the front and rear wheels.

== Rim/Wheels ==
Cast rims aka "Snowflake" rims were available as an option on the 1985 through 1987 VS700 (US Models) and VS750 (Rest of the world) standard rims were Wire Spoke; 1989 VS800 got 21" front rim/wheel combo that lasted until the 1999 model year. 2000 through 2009 VS800/S50 Boulevard run a 19" front 15" rear combination/. Both the 19" spoked/cast rims & the 21" spoke front rim from the VS700/750/800/S50 are a direct fit for the VS1400/S83, through ALL model years.

== Special features ==
In 1990 a MAP boost sensor was added to the VS1400 model to increase highway mileage. This correlated to a change in the ignitor unit, which went from a two socket 4/6 pin configuration, to a 4/9 pin configuration, with the left/right orientation of the two sockets reversed.
