= Kub =

KUB or KUBS or Kub or Kubs may refer to:

- 2K12 Kub, a Soviet mobile surface-to-air missile system
- Kubb, a Swedish lawn game with wooden blocks
- Kidneys, ureters, and bladder, a medical imaging technique
- Scania K UB, low-entry citybus chassis
- KUB, a ZALA Aero Group military UAV
