= Bajaj Legend =

Indian-made motor scooter

- Manufacturer: Bajaj Auto
- Production: 1999–2006
- Class: Scooter
- Engine: 145 cc (8.8 cu in) four-stroke single-cylinder
- Power: 9 bhp (6.7 kW) @ 6,000 rpm
- Torque: 11.3 N⋅m (8.3 lb⋅ft) @ 4,000 rpm
- Transmission: 4-speed manual
- Suspension: Front: Leading link Rear: Coaxial hydraulic damper
- Wheelbase: 1,275 mm (50.2 in)
- Weight: 115 kg (254 lb) (dry)
- Fuel capacity: 5 L (1.1 imp gal; 1.3 US gal)
- Ground clearance: 145 mm (5.7 in)

The Bajaj Legend is an Indian motor scooter produced by Bajaj Auto, introduced in 1999. The Legend was powered by a 145-cubic-centimetre (8.8 cu in) four-stroke, single-cylinder engine producing 9 bhp (6.7 kW) at 6,000 rpm and torque of 11.3 N⋅m (8.3 lb⋅ft) at 4,000 rpm.

The engine is coupled to a four-speed transmission. The front suspension utilizes a leading link and the rear suspension utilizes a coaxial hydraulic damper. The wheelbase is 1,275 mm (50.2 in), ground clearance is 145 mm (5.7 in), and weight is 115 kg (254 lb). The petrol tank capacity is 5 L (1.1 imp gal; 1.3 US gal).
