= Bajaj Qute =

Four-passenger quadricycle made by Bajaj Auto

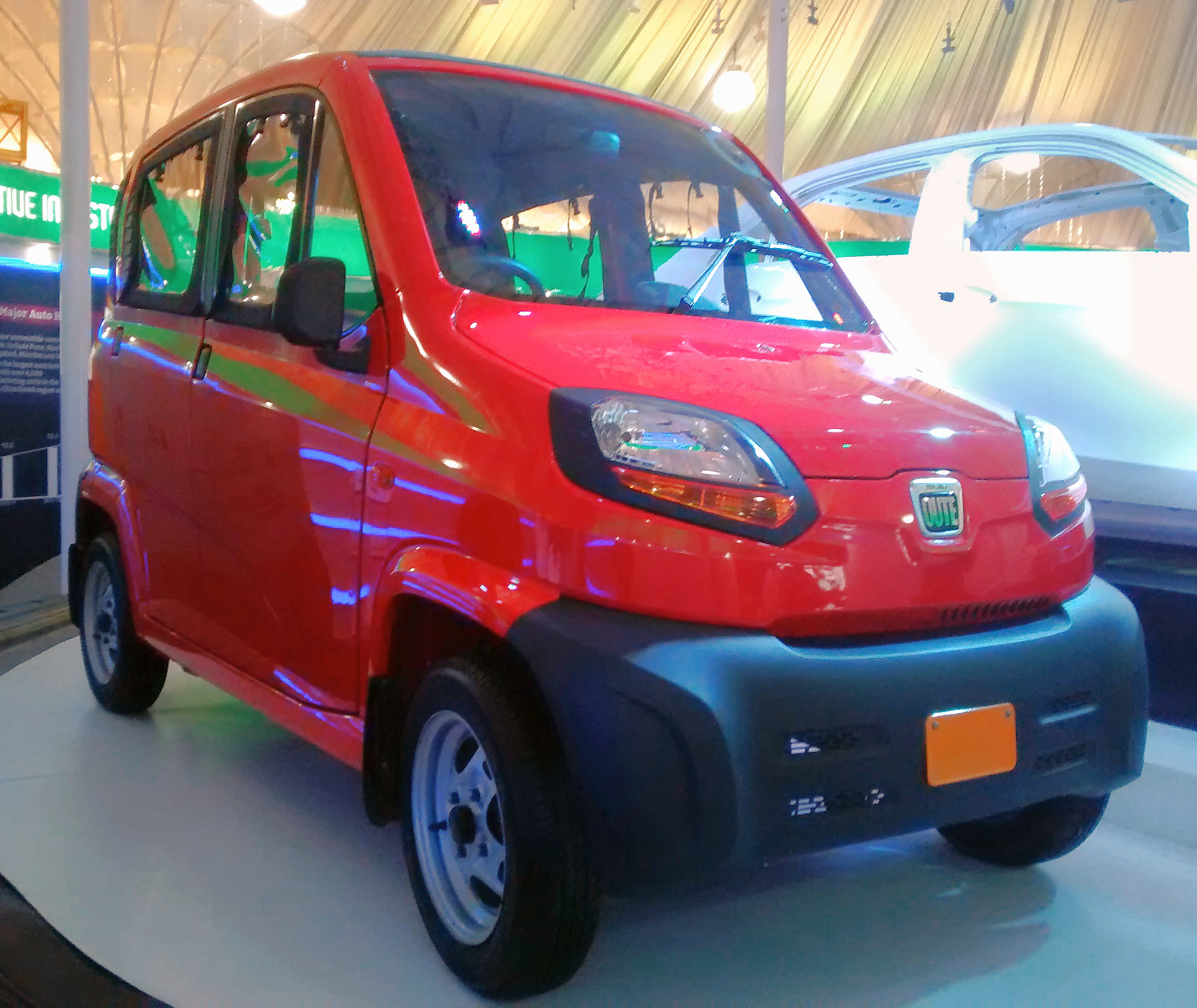

Overview
- Manufacturer: Bajaj Auto
- Also called: Bajaj RE60
- Production: 2013–present
- Designer: Bajaj Auto

Body and chassis
- Class: Quadricycle (According to India's classification system) and L7e Quadricycle (According to Europe's classification system)
- Body style: 4-door hatchback
- Layout: Rear-engine, rear-wheel-drive

Powertrain
- Engine: 217 cc SOHC MPI petrol single (BS IV)
- Transmission: 5-speed sequential manual

Dimensions
- Wheelbase: 1,952 mm (76.9 in)
- Length: 2,752 mm (108.3 in)
- Width: 1,312 mm (51.7 in)
- Height: 1,652 mm (65.0 in)
- Curb weight: 400 kg (880 lb)

The Bajaj Qute (known as Bajaj RE60 during its unveiling in 2012) is a rear-engine, rear-wheel-drive, four-passenger India-classified quadricycle (similar category to the L7e Quadricycle subcategory found in EU-classified quadricycle norms) built by the Indian company Bajaj Auto and is aimed primarily at the Indian domestic market. The Bajaj Qute was the first four-wheeler manufactured by Bajaj Auto. It was unveiled on 3 January 2012 and production started in 2013.

On 22 May 2013, the Government of India legally classified it as a 'quadricycle'. As a result, it is electronically speed-limited to 70 km/h, and as of now, is only allowed to be used for commercial purposes as an alternative to auto rickshaws.

When the Bajaj Qute was brought to Europe, it was classified as an L7e Quadricycle.

== History ==
In 2010, Bajaj Auto announced its partnership with Renault and Nissan to develop a US$2,500 car, aiming at a fuel-efficiency of 30 kilometres per litre (85 mpg_{‑imp}; 71 mpg_{‑US}) (3.3 L/100 km), or twice an average small car, and carbon dioxide emissions of 100 g/km.

Bajaj Auto first unveiled the Bajaj Qute as the RE60 on 3 January 2012, at the 2012 Auto Expo in Delhi. Bajaj Auto was best known for scooters and three-wheel auto-rickshaws, and is India's second-largest two-wheeled vehicle maker and is a world leader in three-wheeled vehicles. The Qute is Bajaj's first foray into the four-wheel market. At its unveiling, the company announced that the car had high fuel efficiency of 35 km/L (99 mpg_{‑imp}; 82 mpg_{‑US}) and low carbon dioxide emissions.

With a fare meter included in the base model's dashboard, the firm is targeting auto-rickshaw drivers by offering a four wheeler as economical to run as a three-wheeler, but safer and more comfortable.

== Technical specifications ==
The Qute is powered by a 217-cc single cylinder engine with a capability to generate power output of 20 hp (15 kW). It has a metal-polymer monocoque body, it weighs 400 kilograms (880 lb), and its turning radius is 3.5 metres (11 ft). Its top speed is 70 kilometres per hour (43 mph).

== Safety ==
The Qute in its standard European market configuration received 1 star in the Euro NCAP Quadricycle Ratings in 2016.

== Plans ==
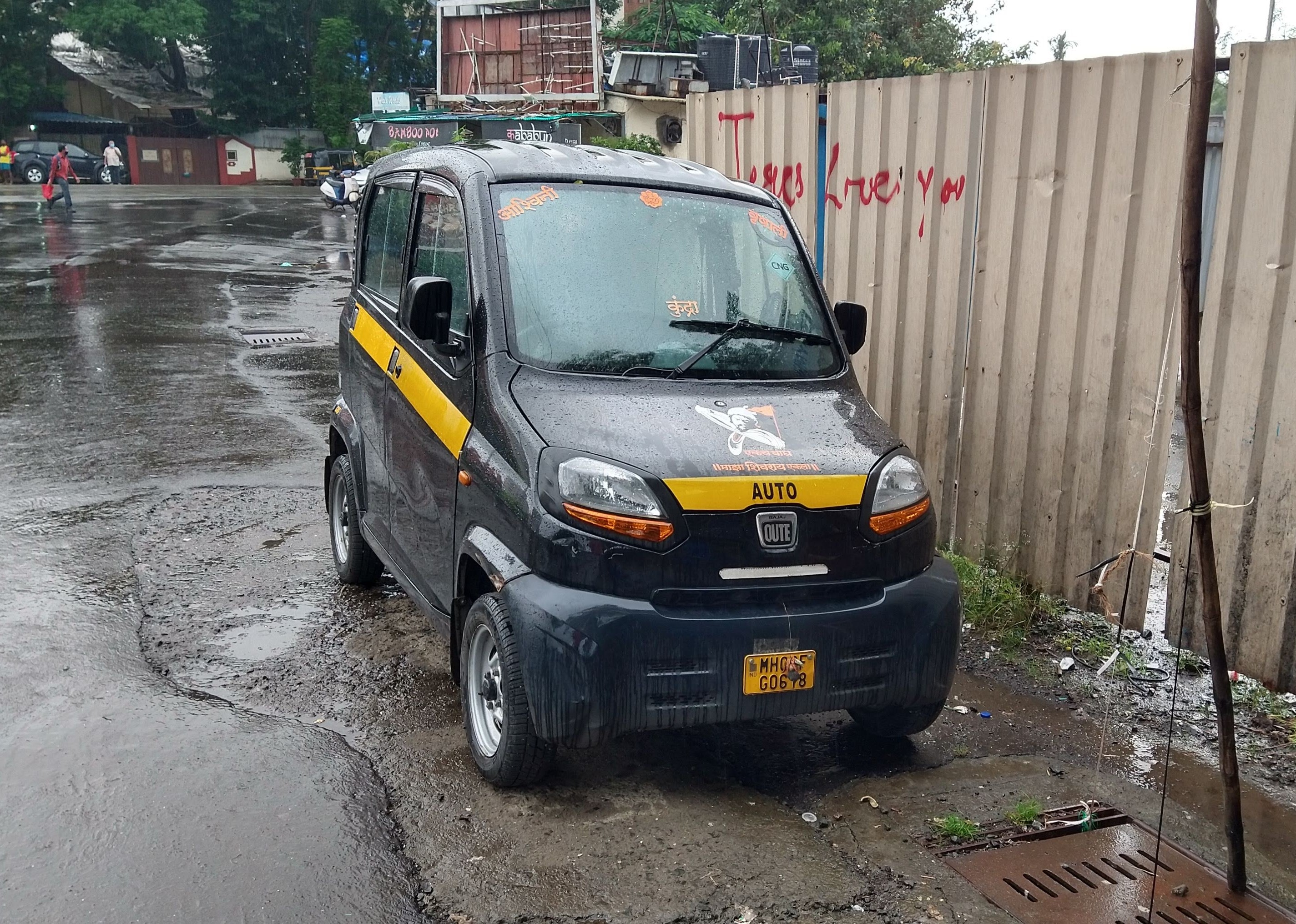
A Bajaj Qute being used as an auto-rickshaw in Andheri, Mumbai.

Bajaj Auto plans to roll out 5,000 units/month of its much-delayed four-seater 'quadricycle' Qute from its Aurangabad Plant and it is to be priced between ₹1.25 lakh and ₹2.5 lakh. The Ministry of Road Transport and Highways has decided to allow operation of quadricycles as passenger vehicles, besides commercial use. They have allowed 16-year-olds to drive only quadricycles.

In 2019, Qute received all necessary approvals for Indian roads after enduring six years of legal battles and regulatory challenges. The governments of 22 states have granted their approval, and it is already operating on the roads in six of those states: Kerala, Gujarat, Rajasthan, Uttar Pradesh, Odisha, and Maharashtra.

== In popular culture ==
A Bajaj Qute appears in the 2022 American romantic comedy film The Lost City, where it is used by the main characters before being destroyed.

== See also ==
- Tata Nano (2008 - 2018) – Another Indian remarkably small and cheap 4-door car.
