= Akurdi, Mawal =

Village in Maharashtra

Akurdi
- Village
- Location in Maharashtra, India Akurdi (India)
- Coordinates: 18.5259577°N 73.4144679°E
- Country: India
- State: Maharashtra
- District: Pune
- Tehsil: Haveli

Government
  - Type: Panchayati Raj
  - Body: Gram panchayat

Area
  - Total: 387 ha (960 acres)

Population (2011)
  - Total: 184
  - Density: 47.5/km^{2} (123/sq mi)
- Sex ratio 99/85 ♂/♀

Languages
  - Official: Marathi
  - Other spoken: Hindi
- Time zone: UTC+5:30 (IST)
- Pin code: 410405
- Telephone code: 02114
- ISO 3166 code: IN-MH
- Vehicle registration: MH-14
- Website: pune.nic.in

Akurdi is a village in Mawal taluka, in Pune district, in the state of Maharashtra, India.It encompasses an area of 387 ha (956 acres).

== Administration ==
The village is administrated by a sarpanch, an elected representative who leads a gram panchayat. At the time of the 2011 Census of India, the gram panchayat governed three villages and was based at Ambi.

== Demographics ==
At the 2011 census, the village comprised 40 households. The population of 184 was split between 99 males and 85 females.

== See also ==
- List of villages in Mawal taluka
