= Bajaj Auto =

Indian two-wheeler and three-wheeler manufacturing company pvt ltd

Bajaj Auto Limited
- Type: Public
- Traded as: BSE: 532977; NSE: BAJAJ-AUTO; NSE NIFTY 50 constituent
- ISIN: INE917I01010
- Industry: Automotive
- Founded: 29 November 1945; 80 years ago
- Founder: Jamnalal Bajaj
- Headquarters: Pune, Maharashtra, India
- Areas served: Worldwide
- Key people: Rajiv Bajaj (chairman, MD & CEO)
- Products: Motorcycles and three-wheeler vehicles
- Production output: ▲6,330,000 units (2019)
- Revenue: ▲₹52,468 crore (US$5.4 billion) (FY2025)
- Operating income: ▲₹10,223 crore (US$1.1 billion) (FY2025)
- Net income: ▲₹7,324 crore (US$760 million) (FY2025)
- Total assets: ▲₹54,198 crore (US$5.6 billion) (FY2025)
- Total equity: ▼₹35,188 crore (US$3.7 billion) (FY2025)
- Number of employees: 5,598 (31 March 2025)
- Parent: Bajaj Group
- Subsidiaries: KTM; Husqvarna Motorcycles; Bajaj Chetak
- Website: bajajauto.com

Bajaj Auto Limited (/bəˈdʒɑːdʒ/ bə-JAHJ) is an Indian multinational automotive manufacturing company based in Pune. It manufactures motorcycles, scooters and auto rickshaws. Bajaj Auto is a part of the Bajaj Group. It was founded by Jamnalal Bajaj (1889–1942) in Rajasthan in the 1940s.

Bajaj Auto is the world's third-largest manufacturer of motorcycles and the second-largest in India. It is the world's largest three-wheeler manufacturer. In December 2020, Bajaj Auto crossed a market capitalisation of ₹1 trillion (US$10 billion), making it the world's most valuable two-wheeler company.

== History ==
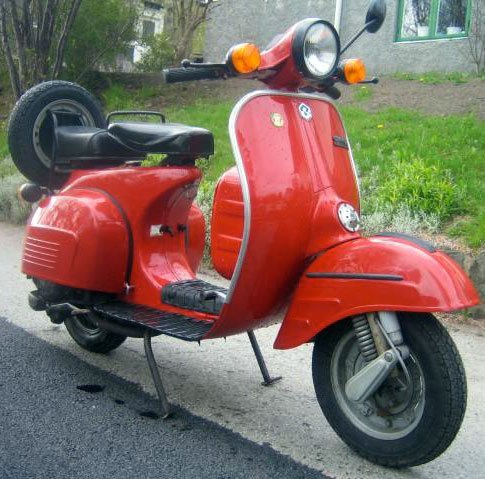
Bajaj Chetak built under license from Piaggio

Bajaj auto was established on 29 November 1945 as M/s Bajaj Trading Corporation Private Limited. It initially imported and sold two- and three-wheelers in India. In 1959, it obtained a license from the Government of India to manufacture two-wheelers and three-wheelers and obtained a licence from Piaggio to manufacture Vespa scooters in India. It became a public limited company in 1960.

With the launch of motorcycles in 1986, the company changed its branding from a scooter manufacturer to a two-wheeler manufacturer.

In 1984, Bajaj Auto signed a technical assistance agreement with Kawasaki, cooperating to expand production and sales of motorcycles in the local market.

In the early 2000s, Bajaj Auto bought a controlling stake in the Tempo Firodia company, renaming it "Bajaj Tempo". Germany's Daimler-Benz owned 16% of Bajaj Tempo, but Daimler sold their stake back to the Firodia group. It was agreed that Bajaj Tempo would gradually phase out the use of the "Tempo" brand name, as it still belonged to Mercedes-Benz. The name of the company was changed to Force Motors in 2005, dropping "Bajaj" as well as "Tempo", over the objections of Bajaj Auto with whom the company shares a long history as well as a compound wall.

In 2007, Bajaj Auto, through its Dutch subsidiary Bajaj Auto International Holding BV, purchased a 14.5% stake of Austrian rival KTM, gradually increasing its stake to a 48% non-controlling share by 2020. In December 2020, Bajaj started discussions on swapping its stake from KTM to KTM's controlling shareholder Pierer Mobility, a subsidiary of Pierer Industrie.

On 26 May 2008, Bajaj Auto Limited was split off into three corporate entities — Bajaj Finserv Limited (BFL), Bajaj Auto Ltd (BAL), and Bajaj Holdings and Investment Ltd (BHIL).

In 2017, Bajaj Auto and Triumph Motorcycles Ltd teamed up to build mid-capacity motorcycles.

In 2017, Bajaj and Kawasaki ended a sales and services partnership in India for the sale and after-sales service of Kawasaki motorcycles, which had been established in 2009. The partnership's dealerships were later converted into KTM ones. Bajaj and Kawasaki continue with their relationship in overseas markets.

On 26 November 2019, Bajaj Auto invested about ₹57 crore ($8 million) in bicycle and electric scooter rental startup Yulu. In this deal, Bajaj would also manufacture customised electric scooters for Yulu.

Bajaj Auto continued its operations in Russia despite the Russian invasion of Ukraine. While many international companies ceased operations in Russia, Bajaj has maintained business as usual in the Russian market.

== Manufacturing ==
The company has plants in Chakan, Waluj in Aurangabad and Pantnagar. The oldest plant at Akurdi in Pune houses the R&D centre 'Ahead'.

== Products ==
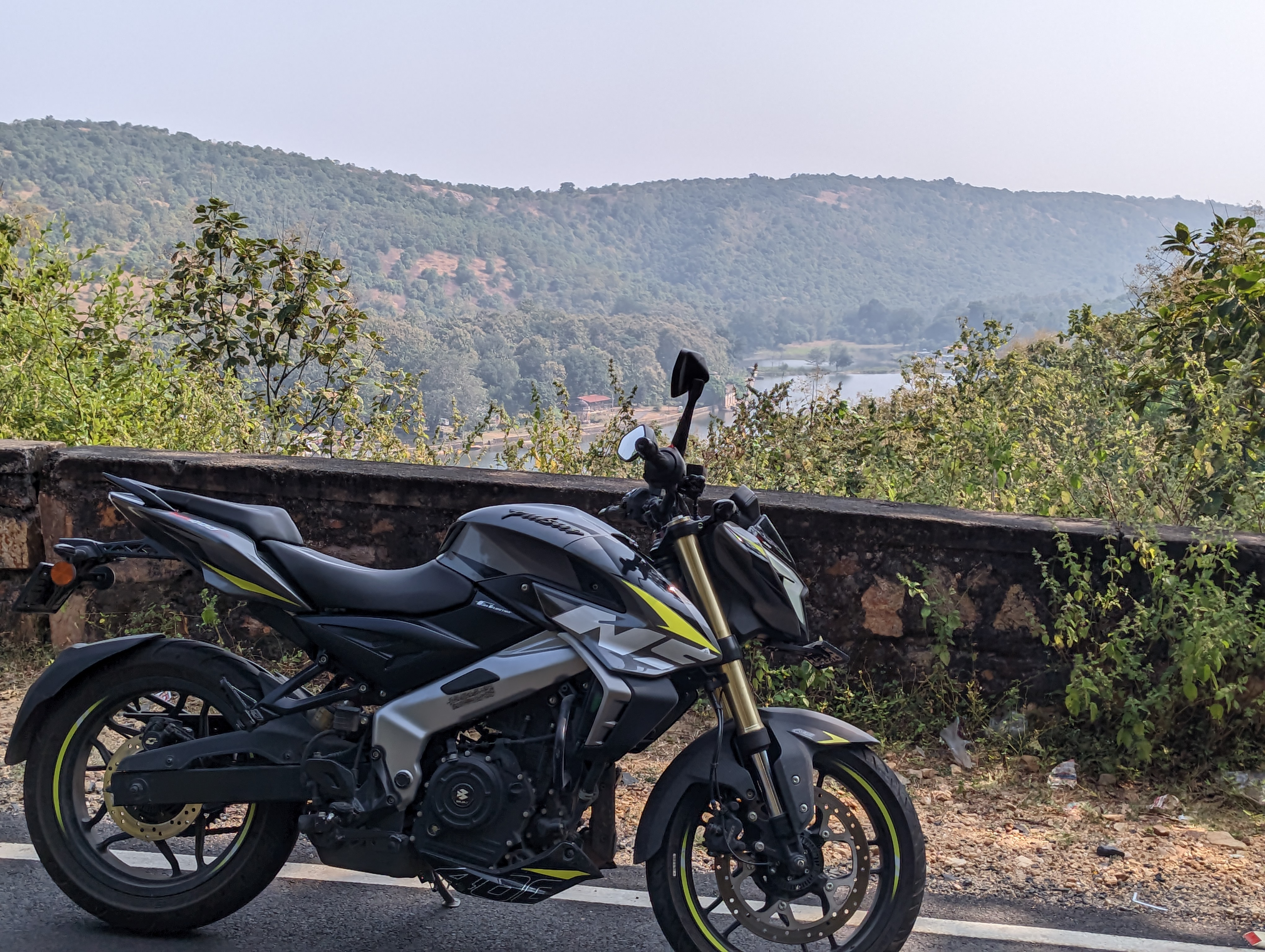
Bajaj Pulsar NS400Z

Bajaj Dominar 400 Tourer

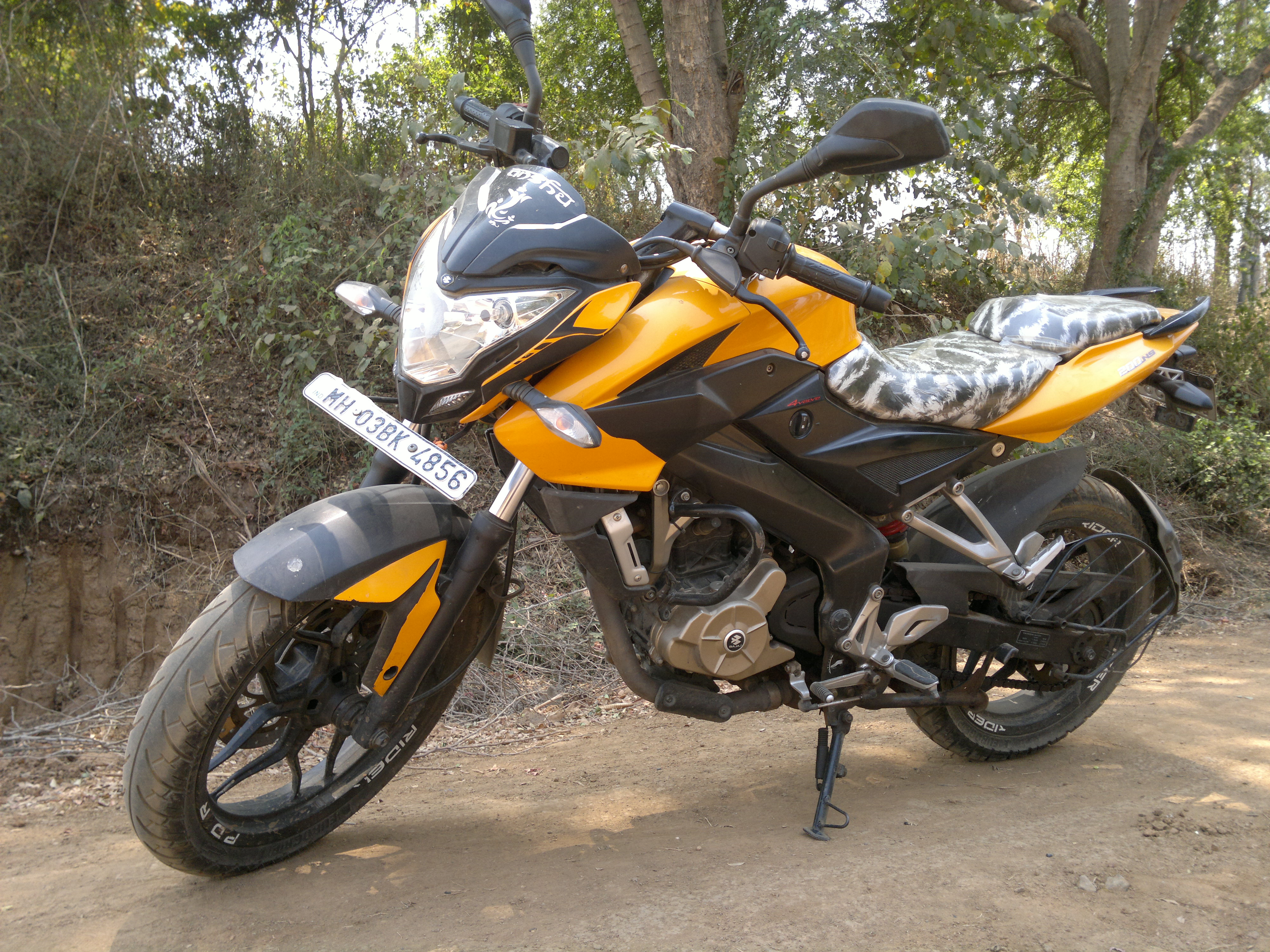
Bajaj Pulsar NS200

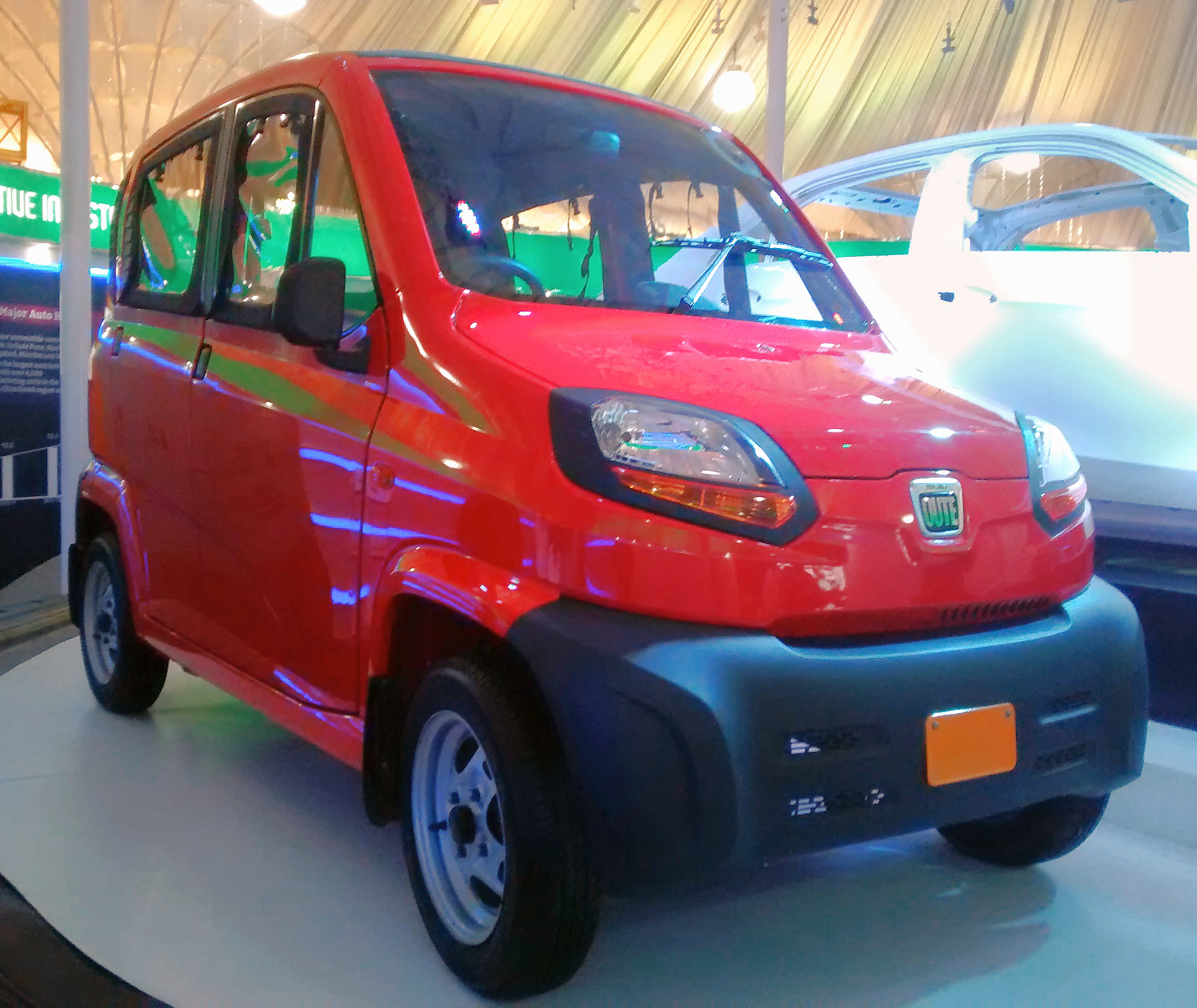
Bajaj Qute

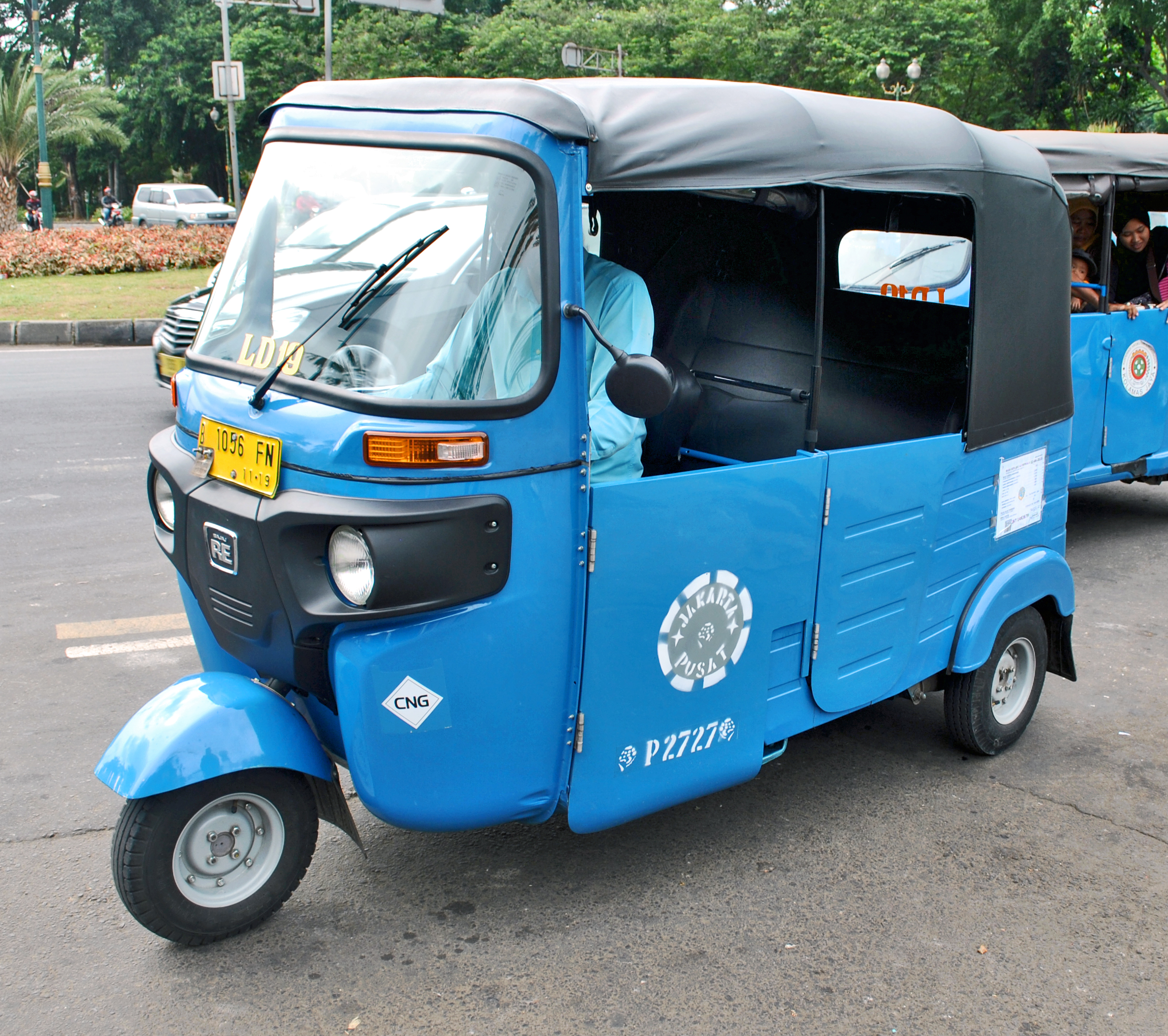
A Bajaj RE autorickshaw in Jakarta, Indonesia

Bajaj manufactures and sells motorcycles, scooters, auto-rickshaws and cars. As of 2004, Bajaj Auto was India's largest exporter of motorcycles.

Bajaj is the first Indian two-wheeler manufacturer to deliver 4-stroke commuter motorcycles with sporty performance for the Indian market. Bajaj achieved this with the 150cc and 180cc Pulsar.

Motorcycles produced by Bajaj include the Dominar, CT 100, Platina, Discover, Pulsar, and Avenger. In FY 2012–13, it sold approximately 37.6 lakh (3.76 million) motorcycles which accounted for 31% of the market share in India. Of these, approximately 24.6 lakh (2.46 million) motorcycles (66%) were sold in India, and the remaining 34% were exported.

=== Auto rickshaw (three wheeler) ===
Bajaj is the world's largest manufacturer of auto rickshaws and accounts for almost 84% of India's three-wheeler exports. During the FY 2012–13, it sold approx. 4,80,000 three-wheelers which was 57% of the total market share in India. Out of these 4,80,000 three-wheelers, 47% were sold in the country and 53% were exported. In Indonesia, Bajaj three-wheelers are described as "iconic" and "ubiquitous" to the point that the word bajaj (pronounced bajay) is used to refer to auto rickshaws of any kind.

=== Low-cost cars ===
In 2010, Bajaj Auto announced cooperation with Renault and Nissan Motor to develop a US$2,500 car, aiming at a fuel efficiency of 30 kilometres per litre (85 mpg_{‑imp}; 71 mpg_{‑US}) (3.3 L/100 km), or twice an average small car, and carbon dioxide emissions of 100 g/km.

On 3 January 2012, Bajaj auto unveiled the Bajaj Qute (formerly Bajaj RE60), a mini car for intra-city urban transportation, which is legally classified as a quadricycle. The target customer group was Bajaj's three-wheeler customers. According to its Managing Director Rajiv Bajaj, the RE60 powered by a new 200 cc rear mounted petrol engine will have a top speed of 70 kilometres per hour (43 mph), a mileage of 35 kilometres per litre (99 mpg_{‑imp}; 82 mpg_{‑US}) and carbon dioxide emissions of 60 g/km.

=== Electric scooters ===
Bajaj launched its first electric scooter, the Chetak, in India in January 2020. In December 2021, Bajaj announced an investment of ₹300 crore to build an electric vehicle production facility in Pune. According to the company, the plant would be able to produce 500,000 electric vehicles (EVs) each year, catering to both domestic and international markets.

== Listing and shareholding ==
=== Listing ===
Bajaj Auto's equity shares are listed on Bombay Stock Exchange where it is a constituent of the BSE SENSEX index, and the National Stock Exchange of India where it is a constituent of the CNX Nifty.

=== Shareholding ===
On 31 December 2022, 54.98% of the equity shares of the company were owned by the promoters Bajaj Group and the remaining were owned by others.

Shareholders (as of 31 December 2022)	Shareholding %
Promoters: Bajaj Group	54.98%
Mutual funds, FIs, and insurance companies	9.73%
Foreign institutional investors	11.82%
Individual shareholders	9.55%
Bodies corporate	4.35%
Foreign portfolio investments corporations	0.60%
GDRs	NIL
Others	8.97%
Total	100.0%

As of 31 March 2020, there were 100 funds that had disclosed positions in the company, including funds by The Vanguard Group, Dimensional Fund Advisors and Fidelity Investments.

== Employees ==
Bajaj Auto had a total of 10,000 employees as of 2019, of which 51 were women (0.63%) and 25 were disabled (0.31%). It spent ₹650 crore (equivalent to ₹13 billion or US$140 million in 2026) on employee benefit expenses during the FY 2012–13. The company was headed by Rahul Bajaj until 2005 whose net worth was around US$2 billion in March 2013. Currently, his son Rajiv Bajaj heads the company.

== See also ==
- List of Bajaj Auto products
- Bajaj Lite
- Energy Conversion Devices, Inc
- List of motorcycle manufacturers
- List of motor scooter manufacturers and brands
