= Bajaj Pulsar =

Range of motorcycles manufactured by Bajaj Auto

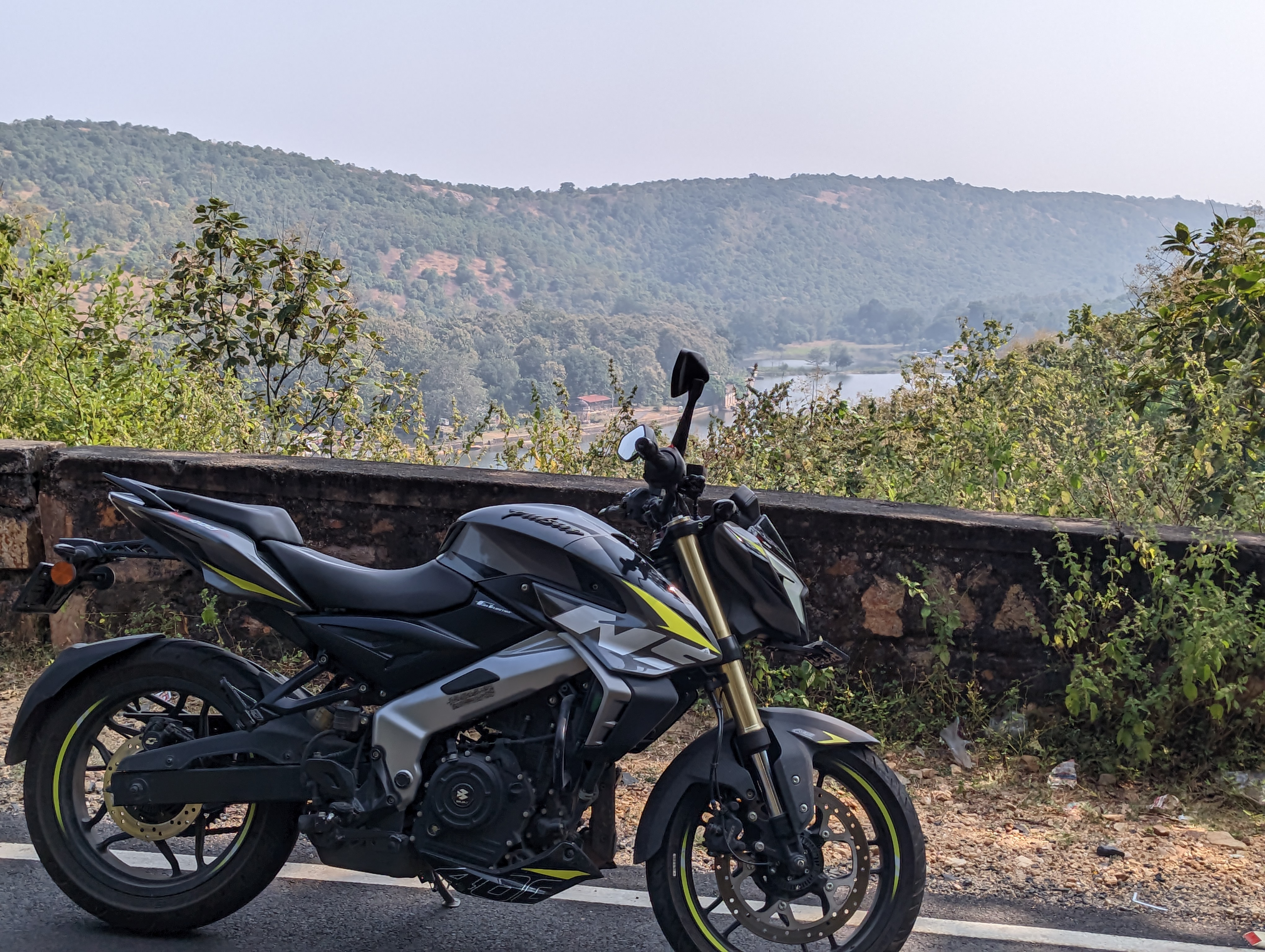
- Bajaj Pulsar NS400Z
- Manufacturer: Bajaj Auto
- Also called: Bajaj Rouser
- Production: 2001–present
- Class: Naked bike, Sports bike

The Bajaj Pulsar is a range of motorcycles manufactured by Bajaj Auto in India. It was developed by the product engineering division of Bajaj Auto in association with Tokyo R&D, and later with motorcycle designer Glynn Kerr.

== Overview ==
A variant of the bike, the Pulsar 200NS, was launched in 2012, but it was suspended for some time (reintroduced in early 2017 with BS IV emission compliance and renamed the NS200). With average monthly sales of around 86,000 units in 2011, Pulsar claimed a 2011 market share of 47% in its segment. By April 2012, more than five million units of Pulsar had been sold. In 2018, the company announced sales of over ten million Pulsar units, accompanied by a television commercial and a promotional ride in six cities to write "PULSAR" on a pre-defined route. The model is sold as Rouser in other markets, such as South America. In Iran, it is known as Bajaj Pulse and has a large following there.

Before the introduction of the Pulsar, the Indian motorcycle market trend was towards fuel-efficient, small-capacity motorcycles (that formed the 80–125 cc class). Bigger motorcycles with higher capacity virtually did not exist (except for the Royal Enfield Bullet with 350cc and 500cc variants). The launch and success of the Hero Honda CBZ in 1999 showed that there was demand for performance bikes. Bajaj took the cue and launched the Pulsar twins (150cc and 180cc) in India on 24 November 2001. Since the introduction and success of Bajaj Pulsar, Indian youth began expecting higher power and other features from affordable motorcycles.

The project faced internal resistance, reservations from McKinsey & Company and doubts about its effects on Bajaj's relationship with Kawasaki. The project took approximately 36 months to complete and cost Bajaj ₹ 1 billion.

Pulsar-180 engine sound
The engine sound of a Pulsar 180 while running

== History ==
=== 2001 ===
The Bajaj Pulsar "Twins" were launched on 24 November 2001. The first generation Pulsar had a 150/180cc two valve, air-cooled, single-cylinder, four-stroke engine which made 12/15 bhp of maximum power respectively. It featured a single spark plug to ignite the air-fuel mixture fed from a carburetor, simple spring shock absorbers, round headlamp dome, voluminous 18 litre fuel tank and a 1,265 mm wheelbase. Disc brakes as standard equipment was a novelty in Indian motorcycles of the early 2000s.

The 180 cc version made 15 bhp and came with a twin-tone horn, which was optional equipment on the 150 cc version. Electric Start (ES) and Engine Killswitch was offered as standard feature in the 180 cc model and optional on the 150 cc model.

=== 2003 ===
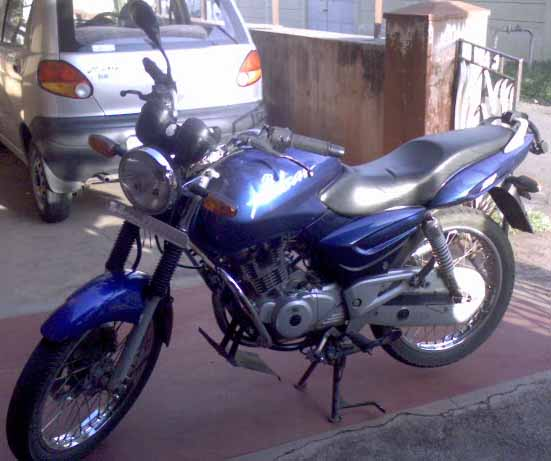
2003 Model bajaj pulsar 150 cc

The second generation Pulsars featured Bajaj Auto's newly developed DTSi (Digital Twin Spark Ignition) technology, which increased the power rating of both versions by 1 hp (0.75 kW) each and also increased fuel economy. This model also introduced a new headlamp assembly, 1,320 mm wheelbase, and standard twin-tone horn and trip meter.20

=== 2005 ===
In 2005, Bajaj launched Pulsar 150. The bike was offered with 17-inch (430 mm) alloy wheels as standard option, and the stance was also lowered by about 12 mm. The fuel tank had a capacity of only 15 litres when compared to the original 18 litres, this was done in order to make the tank look proportionate with the new low-slung stance. The power output was further increased to 13.5 hp (10.1 kW) @ 8500 rpm for the 150 while it increased to 16.5 hp (12.3 kW) @ 8500 rpm for the 180. The rear shock absorbers were gas-filled Nitrox absorbers.

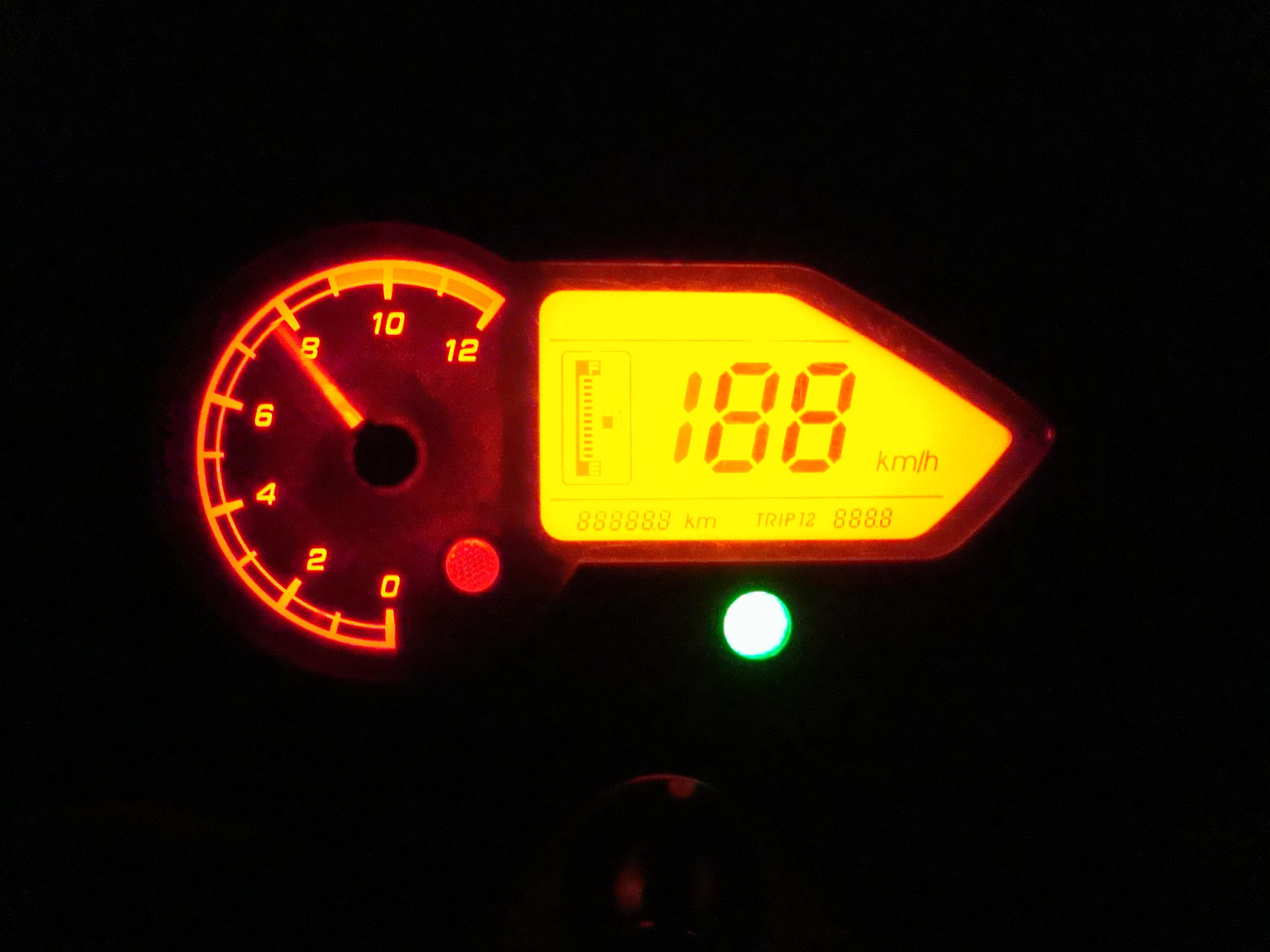
The LCD screen introduced with the UG-3 version of the Pulsar

=== 2006 ===
In 2006, Bajaj introduced another version of Pulsar (UG III). New features included pilot lamps separated from the main headlamp, turn indicators with clear lenses and amber bulb, self-cancelling turn indicator switch, flush LCD screen with digital read-out of key vehicle data, non-contact speed sensor, non-contact backlit switches, twin-stripe LED tail-light assembly, and side panels altered for a sharp, tapering-towards-the-rear look. The engine had increased torque availability, reduced vibration, and improved gear shift feel.

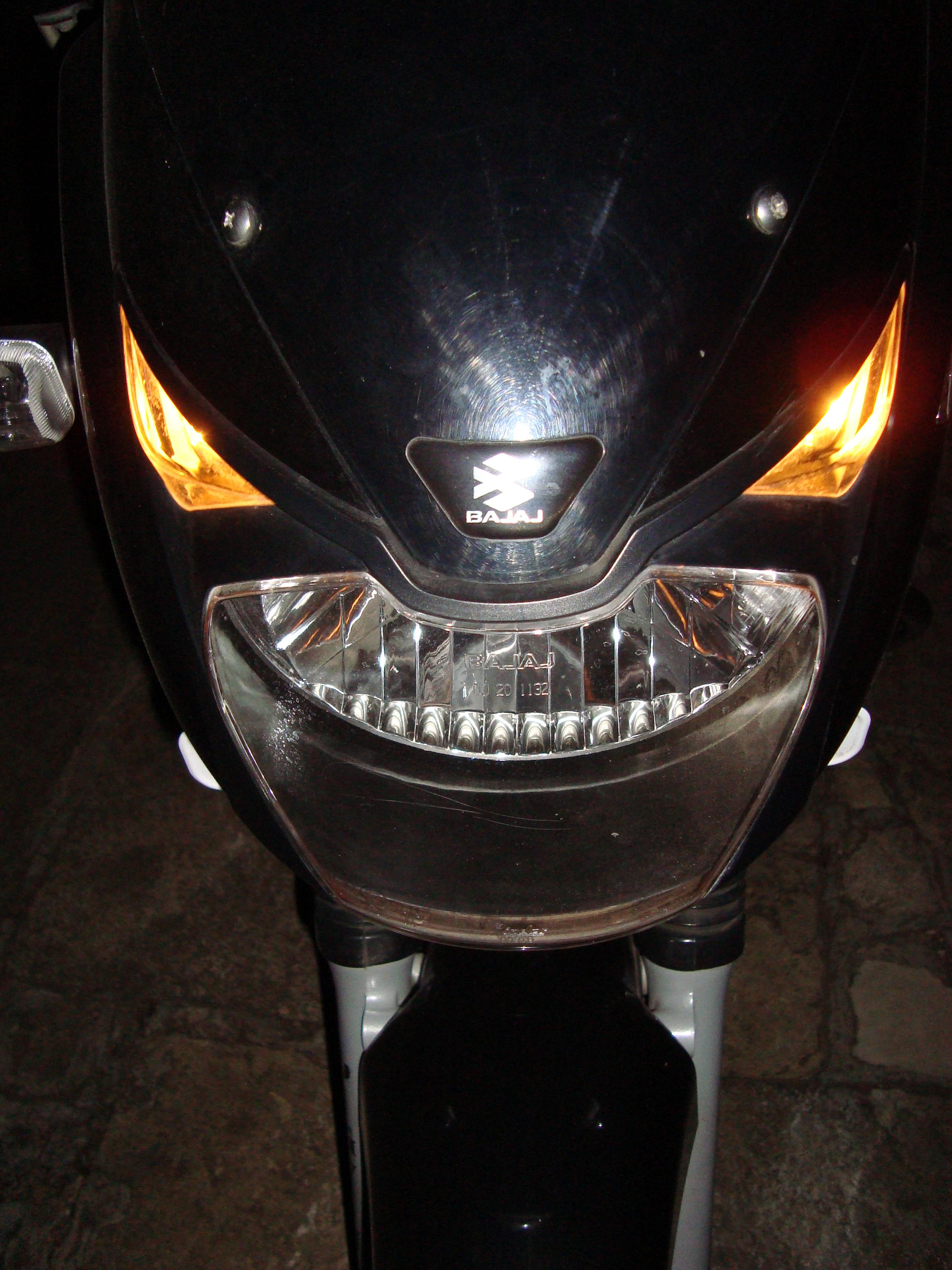
The new headlamp design introduced for the entire Pulsar series in 2006

=== 2007 ===
In July 2007, Bajaj began selling the Bajaj Pulsar 220 DTS-Fi and Pulsar 180 DTS-i, the former featuring fuel injection and oil cooled engines, a digital dash, and modern styling. This bike has some features which are totally new to the Indian market, like the fuel injection itself, rear disc brake and clip-on handlebars (the first two only available in the 220 model).

=== 2008 ===
The new Pulsar has many firsts to its credit. It comes equipped with an oil cooler, which helps control engine oil temperatures at sustained high speeds and rpms, thus ensuring more stable engine oil viscosity.

The new digital console is an advanced version of the latest Pulsar family. Apart from the Digital Odometer, Digital Speedo Meter, Digital Fuel Gauge, Self Cancelling Indicators and two Digital Trip Meters, the console on the 180 cc Pulsar DTS-I has indicators for the air filter condition, engine temperature, battery voltage and oil level. Later 200cc version was discontinued and fuel injection system of 220 was replaced with carburetor which resulted in cost reduction to Rs 73000 ex showroom Delhi

=== 2009 ===
Bajaj released the UG IV (fourth upgrade) versions of the Pulsar 150 and Pulsar 180 in April 2009. The upgrades for the Pulsar 150 included an all-black theme, tank scoops similar to those on the Pulsar 200, a 3D Pulsar logo, and a changed electrical system (full DC). Power also increased from 13.5 HP to 14.09 HP (at 8,500 rpm).

Electrical enhancements like auto head light switch-off after few seconds of turning the engine off to protect the battery, self-cancelling turn signals, icon illumination (horn icon, indicator icon, engine cut off icon, etc.), side stand warning light, dual digital trip meter, low fuel warning light (which also flashes when the engine and Auto Choke System in 220 Variant.

The Pulsar 180 received upgrades like wider tyres, split seat, tank scoops, clip-on handlebars, 3D Pulsar logo, swing arm suspension borrowed from Pulsar 200, and thicker forks. The power was increased to 17 PS.

Bajaj launched a carbureted version of Pulsar 220 in June 2009, tagging it as "the fastest bike in India". It also discontinued the production of Pulsar 200 in July 2009.

Bajaj also introduced a new Light Sports version of Pulsar named as Pulsar 135LS. It is the first bike in India to contain 4-valve DTS-i technology. It consists 4 smaller valves rather than 2 standard bigger valves, styling also is changed and looks become more aggressive. The bike is ARAI certified for 68.5 km/L and weights only 122 kg.

=== 2010 ===
Bajaj released the UG 4.5 versions of the Pulsar 150. The upgrades for the Pulsar 150 included clip-on handlebars like those in Pulsar 135LS. Power also increased from 14.09 HP to 15.06 HP (at 9,000 rpm).

The model badge was redesigned and did not feature 'DTS-i' as in the previous models.

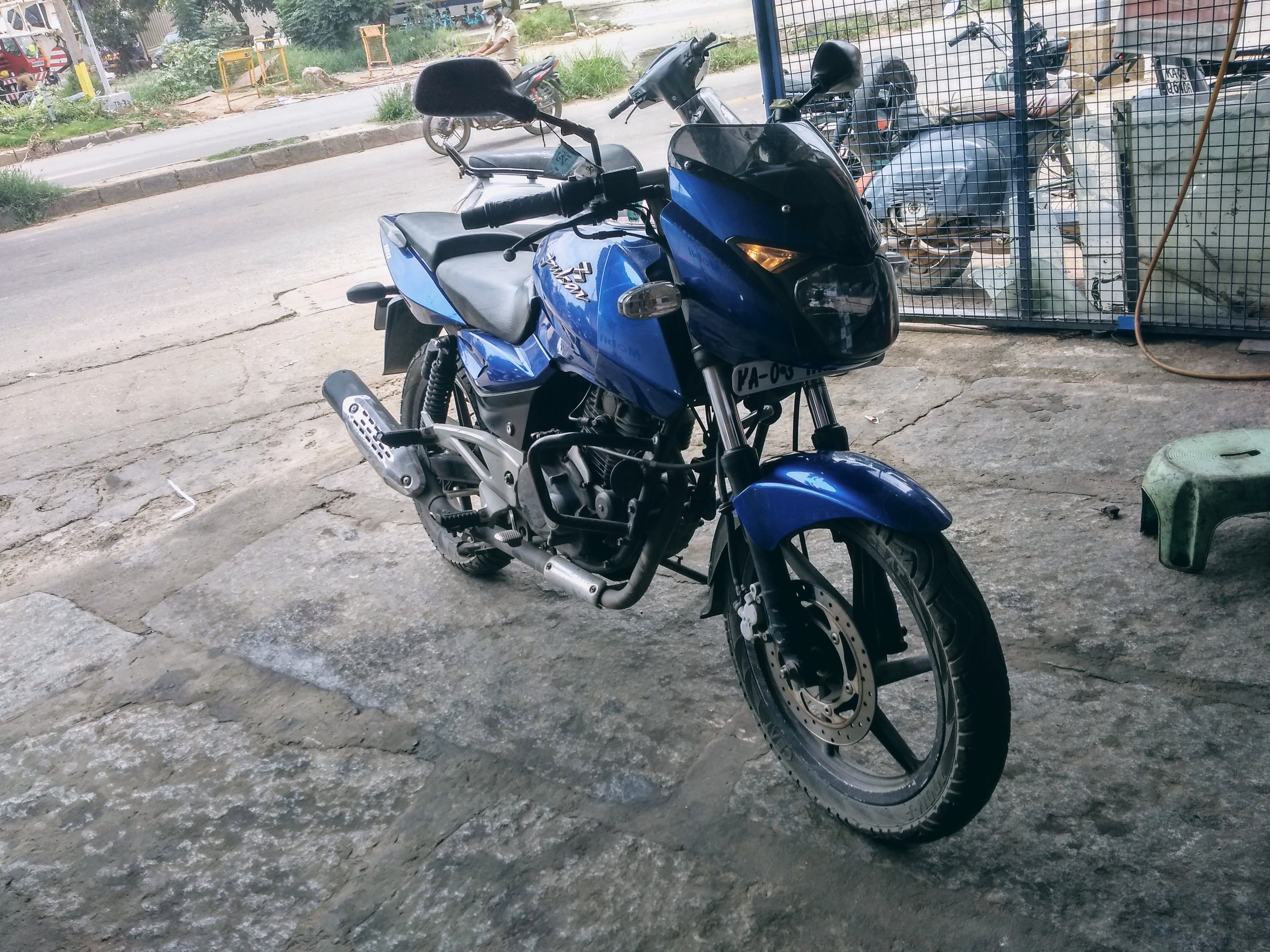
Bajaj Pulsar 180 2010 model in Bengaluru, India

A naked version of Pulsar 220 is also launched, named as Pulsar 220S (Street Fighter) which retains everything from Pulsar 220 except the front fairing. Front fairing is similar to Pulsar 180/150. The former Pulsar 220 was renamed as Pulsar 220F.

=== 2011 ===
Bajaj released newer color schemes for the Pulsar 135LS, 150, 180 and 220F.

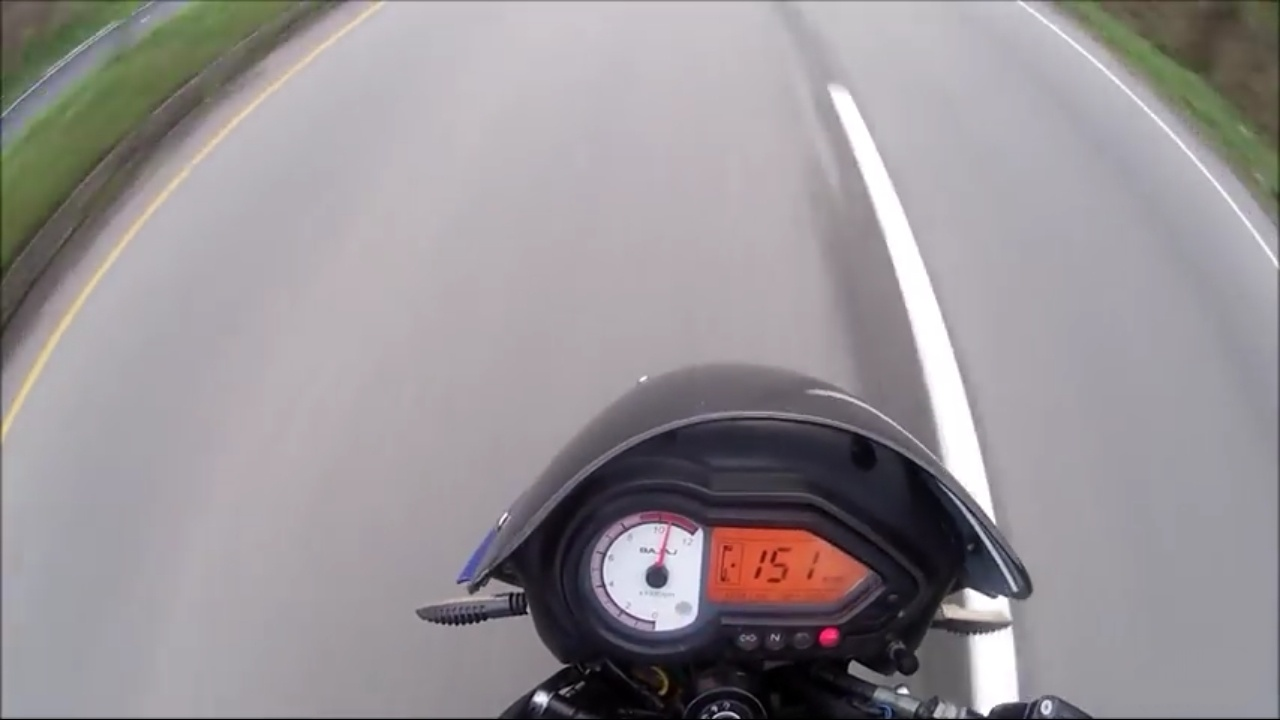
Riding a Pulsar 180cc on Indian roads

=== 2012 ===
2012 marked the entry of Bajaj's latest design, the Pulsar 200NS (NS standing for Naked-Sport). The bike has a revised 200 cc liquid-cooled engine derived from the KTM 200 Duke, which produces 23.17 bhp (17.28 kW) at 9,500 rpm and 18.3 N⋅m (13.5 lbf⋅ft) at 8,000 rpm. It has a new triple-spark design, along with a new four-valve SOHC. The company claims a top speed of 136 km/h (85 mph). It does not have fuel injection like its predecessor, the Pulsar 220Fi. It has a petal disc brake on the front, a disc brake on the rear wheel, and a gas-charged monoshock. It was launched in April 2012. Claimed fuel economy is 58 kilometres per litre (140 mpg_{‑US}) when ridden under 60 kilometres per hour (37 mph). Design of the 200NS was by Bajaj lead designer Edgar Heinrich, who left Bajaj to become head of BMW Motorrad design in mid-2012.

=== 2014 ===
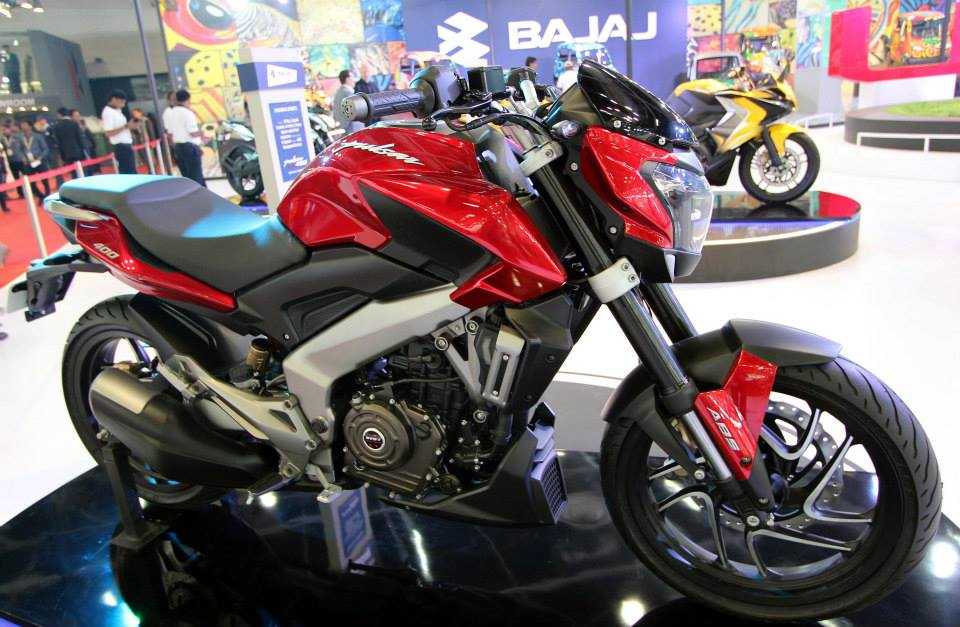
Bajaj Pulsar CS400

tourer version of the naked cruiser Dominar 400

At the February 2014 Auto Expo, Bajaj announced two new 375 cc Pulsar variants : the CS400, an hybrid of naked, tourer and cruiser motorcycle category which would be marketed as a separate Dominar brand and sold as Dominar 400. Later in the following year the a bike looking similar to the RS400 came into production with a 200cc fuel injected engine derived from the NS200, with full fairing and twin projector headlamps and was named as Pulsar RS200. It also is the first Pulsar to get Single Channel ABS as an option.

Dominar 400 would eventually become the flagship bike of Bajaj brand, sold in different category versions such as naked cruiser and touring. It would eventually become one of the best selling bikes in Latin American countries such as Brazil due to cruising and touring accessories with the bike at affordable prices.

=== 2015 ===
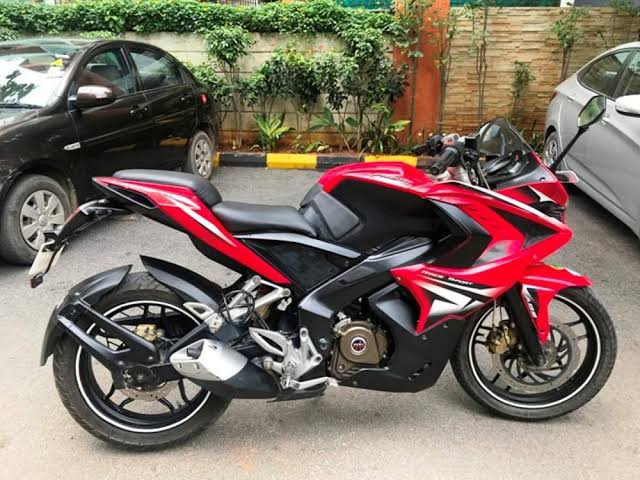
Bajaj Pulsar RS200

In April 2015, Bajaj launched the Pulsar RS200, AS150, and AS200, where 'RS' stood for 'Race Sport' and 'AS' stood for 'Adventure Sport'. The RS200 represents Bajaj's first attempt at a fully faired motorcycle, while the AS series features semi-fairings with projector headlamps common to all models. The AS200 is equipped with the same 199.5 cc, single-cylinder, liquid-cooled engine that also powers the RS200, albeit without fuel injection. Mated to a 6-speed transmission, this engine generates a maximum power output of 23.17 PS at 9,500 rpm, along with a peak torque of 18.3 Nm at 8,000 rpm. Although the AS200 is based on the 200NS platform, the AS150 is constructed on a new perimeter frame instead of the standard Pulsar 150 DTS-i. The motorcycle derives its power from a 149.5 cc, single-cylinder, air-cooled engine, which, when mated to a 5-speed gearbox, produces 16.8 bhp at 9,000 rpm and 13 Nm at 7,500 rpm. The RS200 achieves a slightly higher power output of 24.5 PS, peaking (in comparison to the AS200) at 9,750 rpm, and delivers 18.6 Nm of torque at 8,000 rpm, owing to its fuel injection system. On late 2015 Bajaj had come up with dual tone design, especially for Pulsar 220 Fighter bikes, which was later discontinued for certain colors.

=== 2016 ===
The CS400 concept from the 2014 Auto Expo, went through a series or rebranding before release (Pulsar CS400, Pulsar VS400, Bajaj Kratos 400). Finally, it was separated from the Pulsar range and spawned as the Bajaj Dominar 400.

=== 2017 ===
The 200NS, which was temporarily discontinued in favor of the AS200, was reintroduced as the NS200 with an updated color scheme. Later in the year, NS200 received a Single Channel ABS Variant.

The entire Pulsar lineup (135LS, 150, 180, 220F, NS200, RS200) receives BS4 compliant engines and AHO (Always Headlamp On) as well as a new Laser Edge color scheme. The digital display on received newer graphics and a Blue back light instead of the previously Orange back light. The Pulsar 150 received mechanical changes to conform to BS4 norms, leading to a loss of 1 Ps of power. The Pulsar 180 received a 230mm rear disc brake instead of a drum brake.

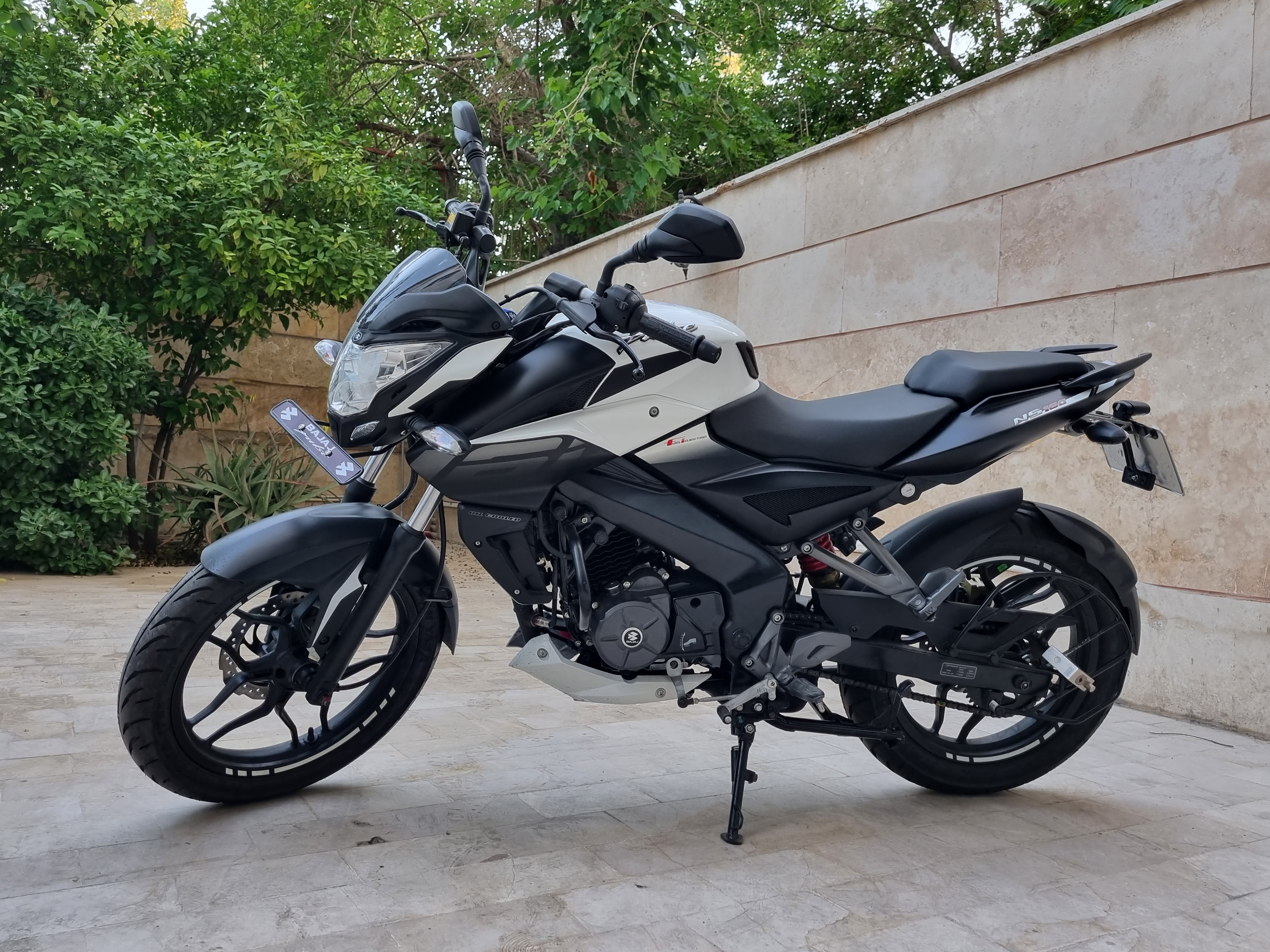
Bajaj Pulsar NS160

A new model named the Pulsar NS160 was released soon after. It shared most of its styling and design with the NS200, but used a smaller 160cc Oil Cooled DTS-i engine producing 15.5 Ps of power at 8500 rpm and 14.6 Nm of peak torque at 6500 rpm. It also features a skinnier rear tire and does not offer a rear disc brake.

The NS200 and RS200 were rebadged and sold in the Malaysian market as the Modenas Pulsar NS200 and RS200. Later NS 160 was equipped with a 120/80 rear tyre and disc brakes.

=== 2019 ===
A scale-down variant of the Pulsar series, the Pulsar 125, was launched in August 2019. It features the same specifications as its older counterpart, the Pulsar 150, albeit being powered by a 124.4 cc engine and has a smaller price tag. The bike produces 11.8 PS at 8500 rpm and has a 5-speed gearbox.

=== 2021 ===
Bajaj launched two new 250cc bikes, Pulsar F250 and N250 as successors of Pulsar 220 range on the 20th anniversary of Pulsar.

=== 2022 ===
Bajaj launched new series of 150/160 cc bikes in N250 line-up, namely Pulsar P150 and Pulsar N160.

=== 2023 ===
Bajaj terminated the Pulsar P150, replacing it with new Pulsar N150 that followed the body style of N160-N250.

=== 2024 ===
Bajaj Updated the Pulsar NS Series (NS125, NS160, NS200). The updated NS now have a new LED headlight with DRLs and LCD digital instrument cluster. Bajaj introduced and launched the Pulsar NS400Z in India. The Pulsar NS400Z gets 373cc single cylinder engine which was used in Dominar 400. In November 2024, Bajaj launched the second 125cc naked bike after NS125, the Pulsar N125, which also uses 125cc l1 engine.

=== 2025 ===
In January 2025, Bajaj Discontinued the Pulsar F250, due to low sales. The Pulsar F250 was expected to succeed the Pulsar 220F, but Bajaj Still sells Pulsar 220F with a BS6 engine. In July, the Pulsar N150 was discontinued and replaced by the new single-seat variant of the Pulsar N160.

Bajaj launched the Pulsar NS400Z and Pulsar RS200. The NS400Z received updates including performance enhancements, new features, and improved hardware. The RS200 also saw updates, primarily new color variants.

Pulsar NS400Z: This model received a significant upgrade with a more powerful engine, revised hardware, and new features. It's now considered the most powerful motorcycle under 2 lakh.

Pulsar RS200: The RS200 was updated with new color options, including black and white.

=== 2026 ===
In late 2025 and early 2026, Bajaj Auto introduced a series of functional and aesthetic updates to the Pulsar 125/Pulsar 150 series to align with modern safety and emission standards (BS6 Phase 2 / OBD-2). While the "Classic" silhouette was retained for the Standard and Twin Disc variants, the lighting and instrumentation were significantly overhauled.

== Technology ==
=== DTSi ===
DTSi stands for Digital Twin Spark Ignition, a Bajaj Auto trademark. Bajaj Auto holds an Indian patent for the DTSi technology. The Alfa Romeo Twin-Spark engines, the BMW F650 Funduro which was sold in India from 1995 to 1997 also had a twin-spark plug technology, and the Rotax motorcycle engines, more recently Honda's iDSI Vehicle engines use a similar arrangement of two spark-plugs. However very few small capacity engines did eventually implement such a scheme in their production prototypes.

==== Patent infringement ====
In September 2007, Bajaj Auto filed a claim accusing that the development of TVS Flame was in violation of their patent for DTS-I. TVS Motors decided to sue Bajaj Auto for libel. In February 2008, the Madras High Court in Chennai restrained TVS from launching it with the twin spark plug technology. TVS appealed against this decision, claiming that crucial evidence was not taken into account and in March 2008, launched the Flame with a modified engine containing one spark plug. The DTSi idea is a simple one to understand – it involved usage of two spark plugs (instead of one) per engine cylinder. On 16 September 2009, the Supreme Court of India permitted TVS Motors to manufacture and sell the 125 cc TVS Flame with Twin Spark Technology until the pendency of the suit before the Madras High Court, but it shall maintain accurate records of its sales all over the country.

=== ExhausTEC ===
ExhausTEC stands for Exhaust Torque Expansion Chamber, a technology patented by Bajaj. The technology involves use of a small chamber connected to the exhaust pipe of the engine to modify the back-pressure and the swirl characteristics, with an aim to improve the low-end performance of the bikes. The ExhausTEC technology is claimed to be highly effective in improving the low and mid-range torque.

=== Copy of Pulsar brand motorcycles ===
There were several allegations of IPR infringement by Chinese manufacturers in Sri Lankan and South American markets. Unauthorised clones of Pulsar are sold in Bangladesh also. The 'Tomahawk' motorcycle manufactured by Hong Kong-based Giantco Limited, 'YB200' motorcycle manufactured by China-based Taizhou City Kaitong Motorcycle Manufacture Co., Limited (the company which made a clone of Piaggio MP3), 'ZX200-7(G) and ZX200-7(II)' motorcycles manufactured by China-based Jiangsu Zhongxing Motor Group Co., Limited, 'RT150-8' motorcycle manufactured by China-based Chongqing Rato Power Co., Limited, 'SM150-GB’ motorcycle manufactured by China-based Pantera Motorcycle Co., Limited, 'HJ200-23' motorcycle manufactured by China-based Guangzhou Panyu Haojian Motorcycle Industry Co., Limited, 'VL150-30, VL150-28 & VL150-26' motorcycles manufactured by China-based Veli Technology Industrial Co., Limited, 'SUM200 Pulsar' motorcycle manufactured by China-based Chongqing Union Co., Limited, 'YG200-7A' motorcycle manufactured by China-based Chongqing Yingang Sci.&Tech.(Group) Co., Limited and 'YX150-CS' motorcycle manufactured by China-based Chongqing YInxiang Motorcycle (Group) Co., Limited are some famous replicas of Pulsar brand motorcycles' Bajaj Pulsar RS 200 Sports Bike.

Model	Company	Replica of
Tomahawk	Giantco Limited	Pulsar 150, 180
ZX200-7(G) & ZX200-7(II)	Jiangsu Zhongxing Motor Group	
YB200	Kaitong Motorcycle	Pulsar 150, 180, 220
RT150-8	Chongqing Rato Power	Pulsar 150, 180, 220
SM150-GB	Pantera Motorcycle Co	
HJ200-23	Guangzhou Panyu Haojian Motorcycle Industry	Pulsar 150, 180
SM150-GB	Pantera Motorcycle	
VL150-30, VL150-28 & VL150-26	Veli Technology Industrial	Pulsar 135
SUM200 Pulsar	Chongqing Union	Pulsar 150, 180
YG200-7A	Chongqing Yingang Sci.&Tech.(Group)	Pulsar 150, 180
YX150-CS	Chongqing YInxiang Motorcycle(Group)	

== Variants ==
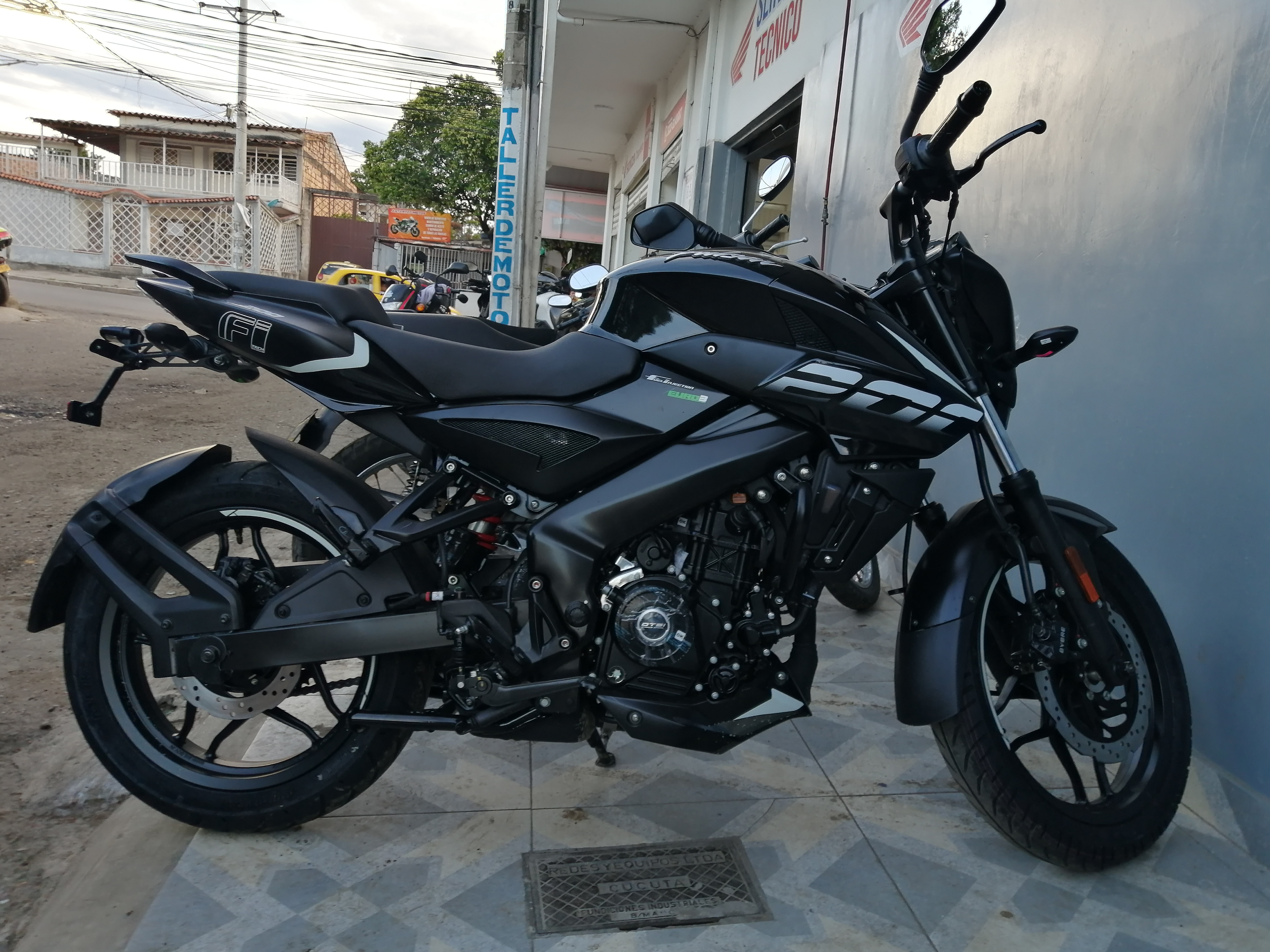
Bajaj Pulsar NS200

- DTS-i Series
  - 125
  - 150
  - 180
  - 200 (Discontinued)
  - 220S (Discontinued)
- LS (Light Sports) Series
  - 135LS (2009–2018)
- AS (Adventure Sports) Series
  - AS150 (2015–2017)
  - AS200 (2015–2017)
- NS (Naked Sports) Series
  - NS125
  - NS160
  - NS200
  - NS400Z
- N (Naked) Series
  - N125 (2024–)
  - N150 (2023–2025)
  - N160 (2022–)
  - N250 (2021–)
- RS (Race Sports) Series
  - RS200 (2015–)
- P Series
  - P150 (2022–2023)
- F (Faired) Series
  - 180F (2019–2021)
  - 220F (2007–)
  - F250 (2021–2025)

== Specifications ==
Version	Capacity (cc)	Wheelbase (mm)	Power (PS)	Torque (Nm)	Top speed (km/h)
Pulsar 125 DTS-i	125	1320	11.64	10.8	116
Pulsar 135LS DTS-i	135	1325	13.5	11.4	112
Pulsar 150 DTS-i	150	1320	14.0	13.6	110
Pulsar 180 DTS-i	180	1350	17.3	15.1	118
Pulsar 200 DTS-i	200	1345	19	17.68	118
Pulsar 220 DTSi-F	220	1350	21	19	144
Pulsar 220Fi DTS-i	220	1350	21	19.12	141
Pulsar 220S DTS-i	220	1350	21.04	19.12	138
Pulsar NS200	200	1363	24.5	18.7	138
Pulsar NS125	125	1363			
Pulsar NS160	160	1363			
Pulsar N160	160		16	14.65	120
Pulsar F250	250		24.1	21.5	142
Pulsar N250	250		24.2	21.5	142
Pulsar AS150	150	1363	17.0	13.0	110
Pulsar AS200	200	1363	23.5	18.3	138
Pulsar RS200	200	1355	24.5	18.7	140
Pulsar NS400Z	400	1363	40	35	176
Pulsar N125	125				
