= TVS Flame =

- Manufacturer: TVS Motors
- Production: 2008–2012
- Predecessor: TVS Victor
- Successor: TVS Phoenix
- Engine: 124.8 cc ccvti 3 valve four stroke
- Power: 10.5 bhp@7500rpm(Single Spark)/10.5 bhp@8250rpm(Twin Spark)
- Torque: 10Nm @ 6000rpm(Single Spark)/10.4Nm @ 6250rpm(Twin Spark)
- Transmission: 4 speed
- Suspension: Telescopic front,5 step adjustable rear shock
- Brakes: front:240 mm disc, rear:130 mm drum
- Wheelbase: 1320 mm
- Dimensions: L: 2030 mm W: 760 mm H: 1070 mm
- Fuel capacity: 7.5 litres

TVS Flame was a 125 cc motorcycle developed by TVS Motors. It was launched in the Indian market in January 2008 and discontinued in 2012 after TVS launched the Phoenix.

== Design and styling ==
The TVS calls their design approach for Flame as Deltaedge. This is inspired by the delta wing of fighter jets and features design cues with a triangular theme, like the arrow shaped headlight. The turn indicators, named Trafficators by TVS is integrated to the fuel tank scoops.

== Performance and fuel economy ==
The engine is developed and patented by AVL and is licensed to TVS. The bike does the 0–60 km/h in 6.5 seconds and is capable of reaching a top speed of almost 100 km/h with a fuel economy of 79 kmpl for the single spark version. while the twin spark version does the 0–60 km/h in 6.1 seconds and manages a top speed in excess of 100 km/h.

== Controversy ==
Flame was in news because of a suit filed by Bajaj Auto alleging a patent infringement. In September 2007 Bajaj claimed that the Flame's engine, having two spark plugs is a violation of their patent no 195904 under the Patents act. After the Chennai high court restrained TVS from launching the bike with two spark plugs, TVS launched Flame with a single spark plug. TVS has stopped production of the single spark Flame. and relaunched the twinspark Flame on 13 November 2009

1.TVS Motors and Bajaj Auto have agreed to settle their patent dispute pending for the last 12 years. The dispute originated in 2007 when TVS motors launched its two-wheeler range named TVS FLAME. Bajaj auto alleged that TVS had copied its patented DTSi (digital twin spark ignition) technology in the new bike.

2.TVS clarified that TVS FLAME used a three-valve engine based on CCVTi (Controlled Combustion Variable Timing Intelligent) technology. TVS further filed a Rupees 250 Crore defamation suit against Bajaj Auto in the Madras High court to counter Baja's patent infringement suit. The Madras high court observed that TVS' three-valve technology was different from Baja's patented DTSi technology and allowed TVS to use the twin timing technology in the newly launched TVS FLAME. Following the Madras high court order, Bajaj filed an appeal in the Supreme Court challenging the decision to permit the production and sale of TVS FLAME bikes. Recently, both companies mutually agreed to withdraw all pending proceedings and release each other from all liabilities, claims, demands and actions with neither company having to pay any compensation or penalty to the other as part of the agreement

== See also ==
- TVS Sport
- TVS Apache
