= Bajaj Pulsar N250 =

Naked bike

- Manufacturer: Bajaj Auto
- Production: 2021–present
- Assembly: India
- Predecessor: Pulsar 220S
- Class: Naked bike
- Engine: 249.5 cc (15.23 cu in) 2-valve SOHC oil-cooled single-cylinder
- Bore / stroke: 72 mm × 61 mm (2.8 in × 2.4 in)
- Compression ratio: 10.3:1
- Top speed: 141 km/h (88 mph) (GPS)
- Power: 24.5 PS (18.0 kW) @ 8,750 rpm
- Torque: 21.5 N⋅m (15.9 lb⋅ft) @ 6,500 rpm
- Ignition type: Digital
- Transmission: 5-speed manual
- Frame type: Pressed steel perimeter frame
- Suspension: Front: Telescopic fork with anti-friction bush Rear: Nitrox monoshock with 7-step adjustability
- Brakes: Front: 300 mm disc Rear: 230 mm disc (dual-channel ABS)
- Tires: Front: 110/80-17; Rear: 140/70-17
- Wheelbase: 1,351 mm (53.2 in)
- Dimensions: L: 1,989 mm (78.3 in); W: 743 mm (29.3 in); H: 1,050 mm (41 in)
- Seat height: 795 mm (31.3 in)
- Fuel capacity: 14 L (3.1 imp gal; 3.7 US gal)
- Oil capacity: 1.7 L (3.6 US pt)
- Fuel consumption: 42–43 km/L (99–101 mpg_{‑US}; 120–120 mpg_{‑imp})
- Related: Bajaj Pulsar F250; Bajaj Dominar 250; KTM Duke 250; Bajaj Pulsar 200NS

The Bajaj Pulsar N250 is a Naked bike made by Indian motorcycle manufacturer Bajaj Auto. It was launched on 28 October 2021 along with faired version of Bajaj Pulsar F250 to marked the 20 years anniversary of Bajaj Pulsar.

It was initially launched in red, blue and techno grey, and with single channel ABS. In June 2022, a dual channel ABS variant was added exclusively with Brooklyn Black shade.

== See also ==
- Bajaj Pulsar
