= Glynn Kerr =

Glynn Kerr is a British-born motorcycle designer residing in California, who has specialised in motorcycle design for over thirty years. He has written for Bike India, Kicxstart (Netherlands), Motorcycle Consumer News (USA), Solo Moto Trienta (Spain), and Two Wheels (Australia). In 1981, Kerr undertook a BA Hons Degree in Industrial Design (Transport) in Coventry University. His designs have appeared on models by manufacturers BMW, Ducati, Honda, Triumph, Aprilia, Harley-Davidson, Kymco, Voxan, Kawasaki, Midual, Fisher and Bajaj.

== Work experience ==
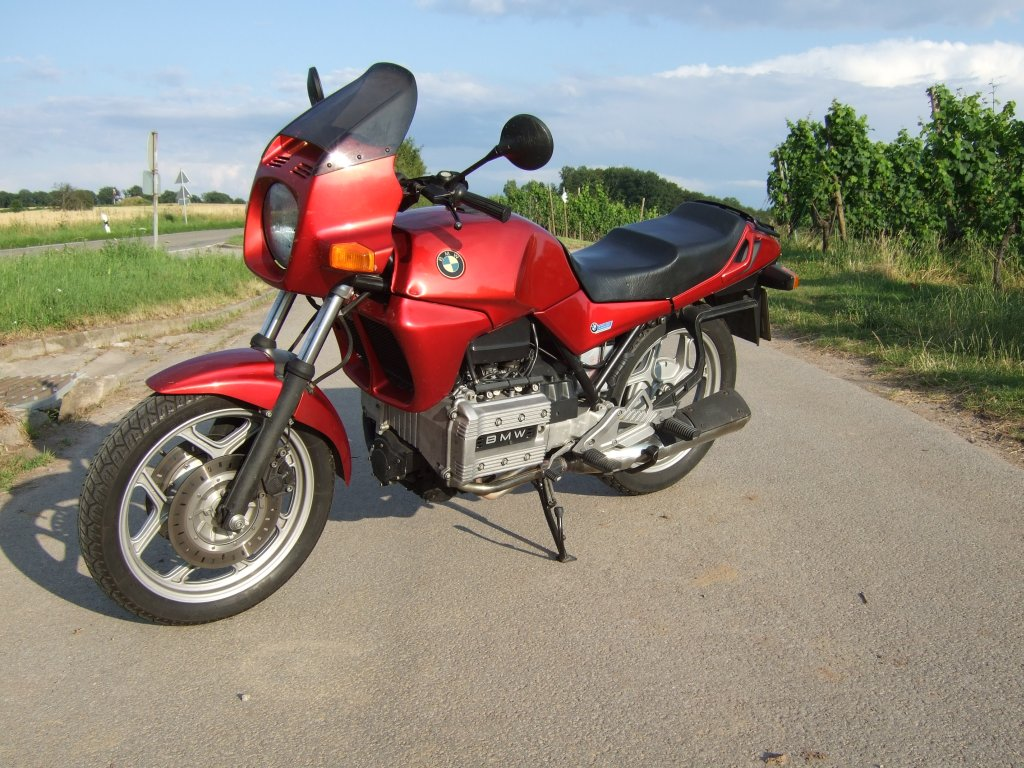
1984 BMW K75 C

After finishing his degree at Coventry University, Kerr worked briefly as an interior and exterior designer for TVR Sports Cars in the UK before moving to Munich to join BMW as an exterior designer in 1982.

Two years later, he transferred to the motorcycle division, BMW Motorrad, since when he has worked exclusively with bikes.

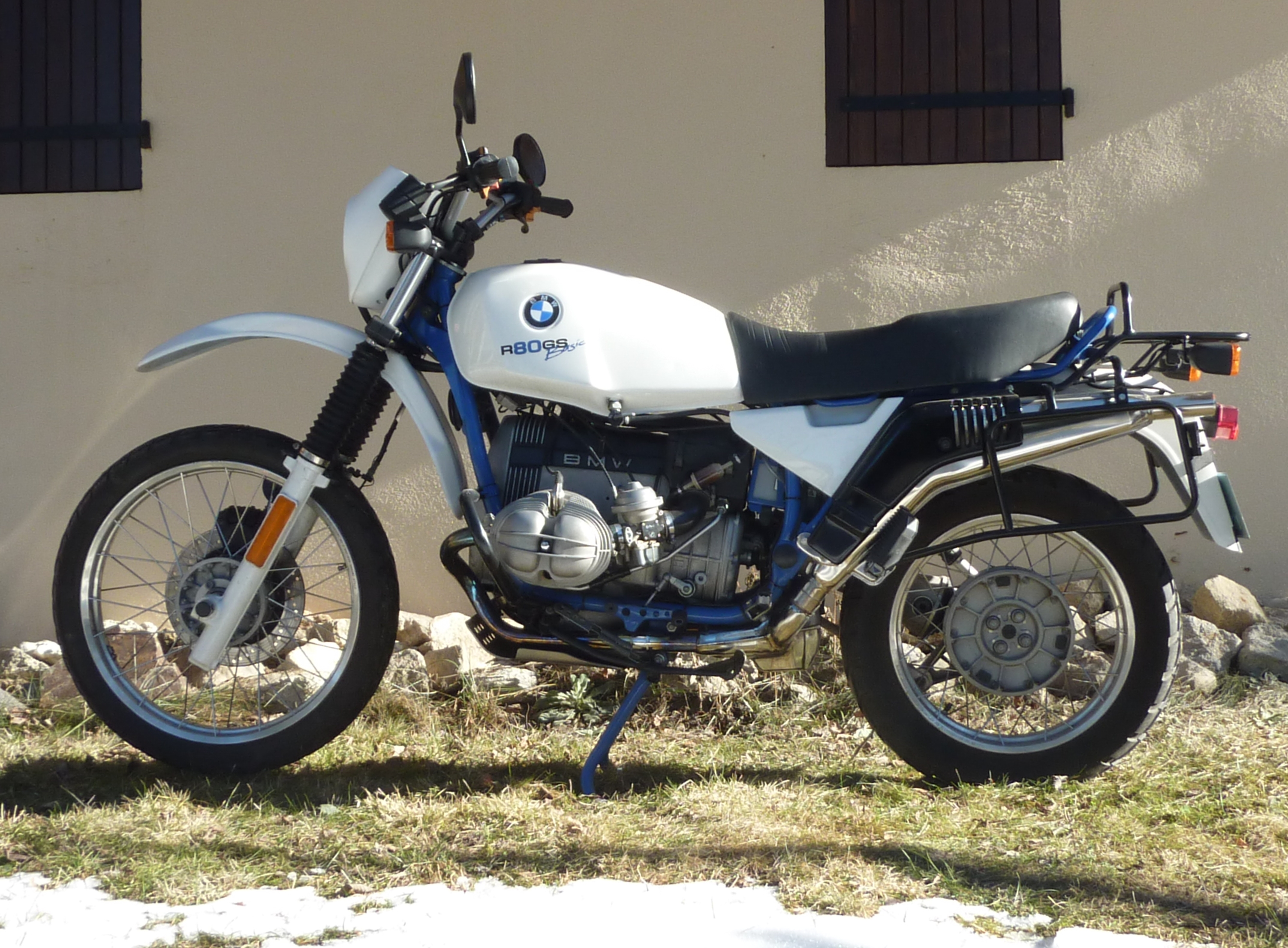
1986 BMW R80 GS

From 1987 to 1990 he was Chief Designer with Amsterdam-based Global Design (now GK Design Europe), the styling studio for Yamaha's European operations, where he penned such models the TDM 850 and TDR 125, also contributing to varied projects such as the GTS, Superténéré, XT600 and BW's scooter.

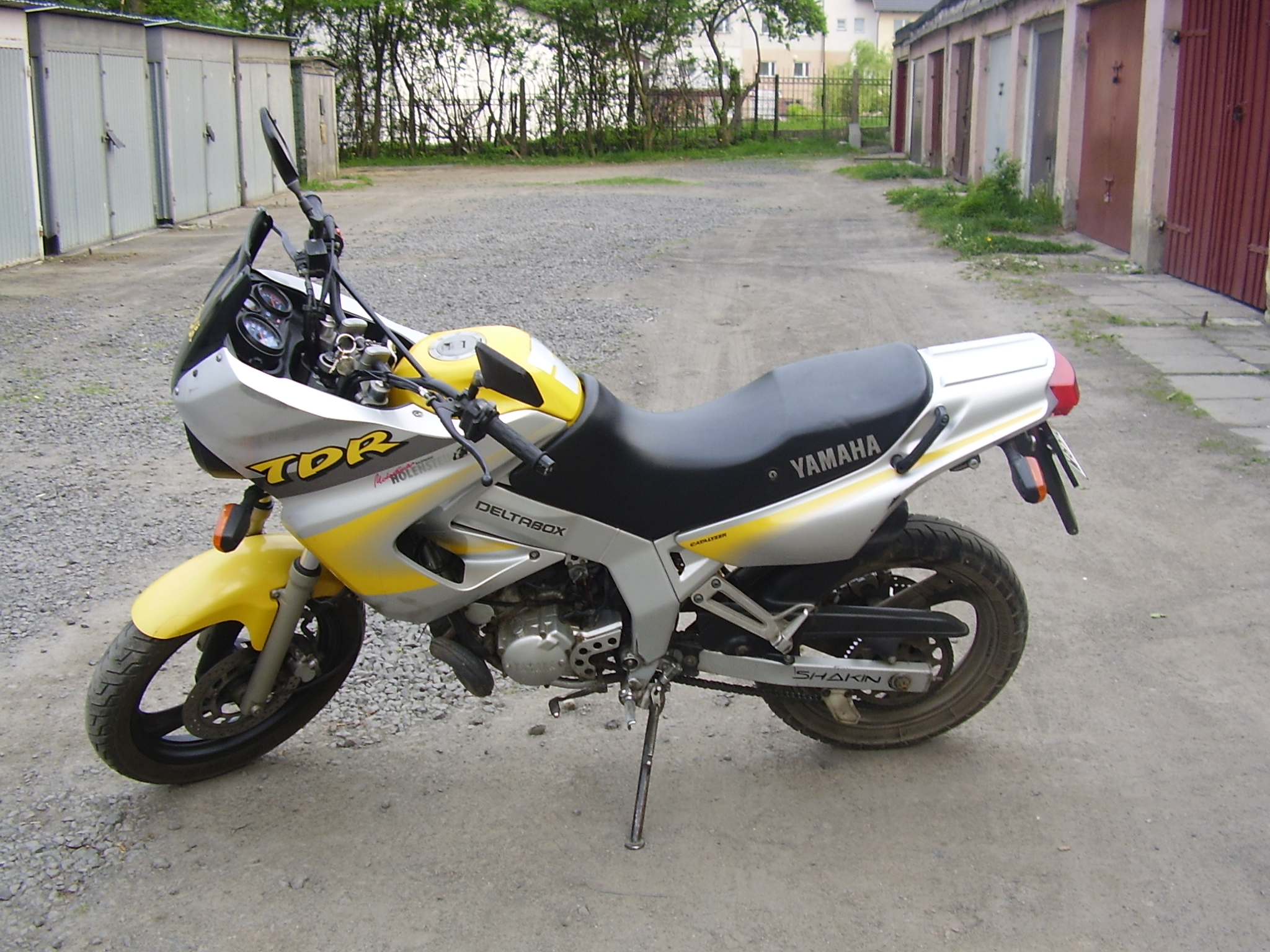
Yamaha TDR 125 series 2

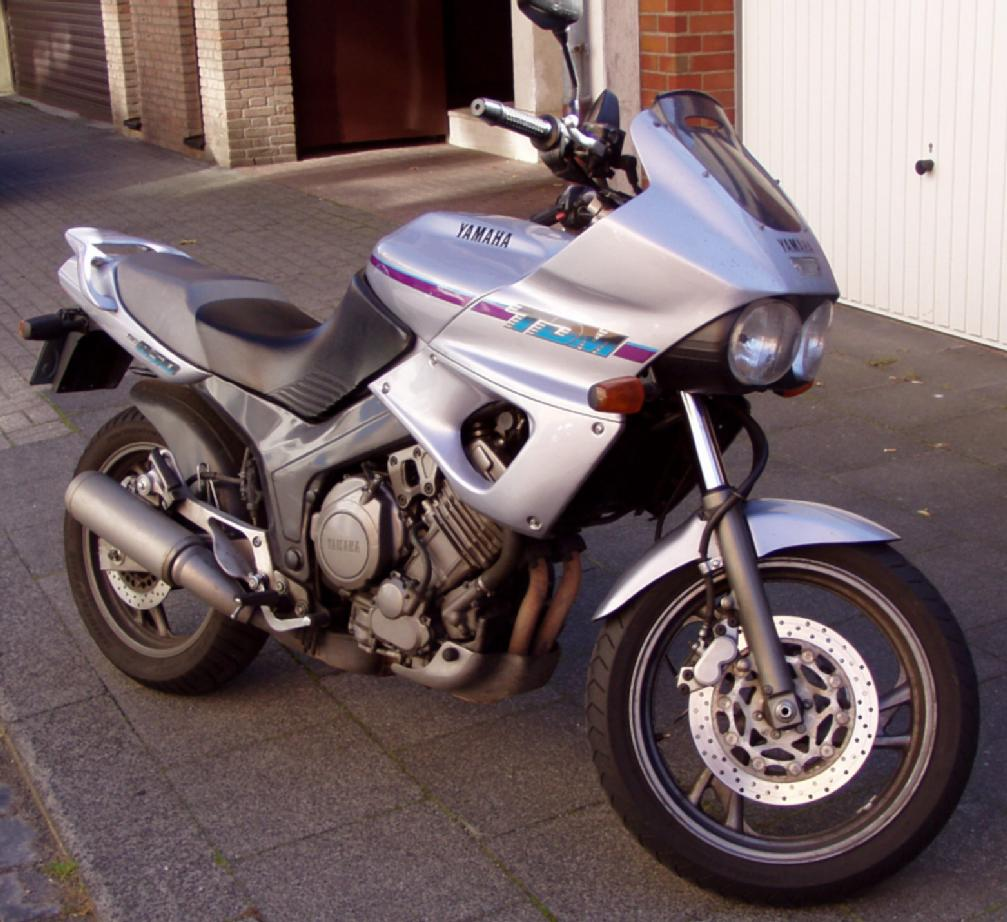
1990 Yamaha TDM 1st generation

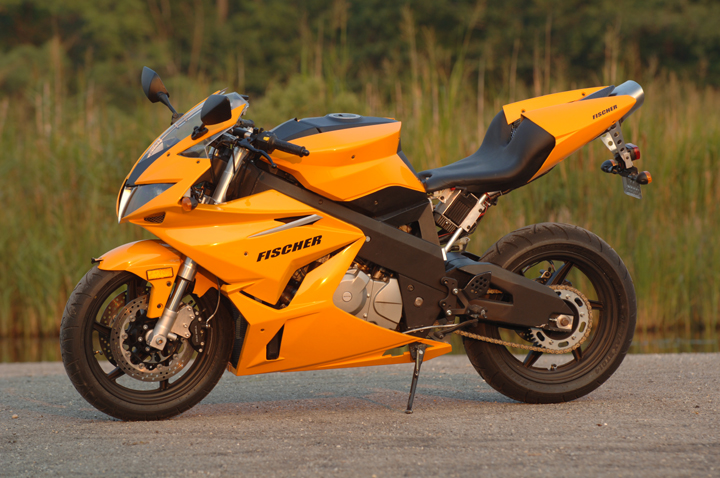
Fischer MRX & Cathcart

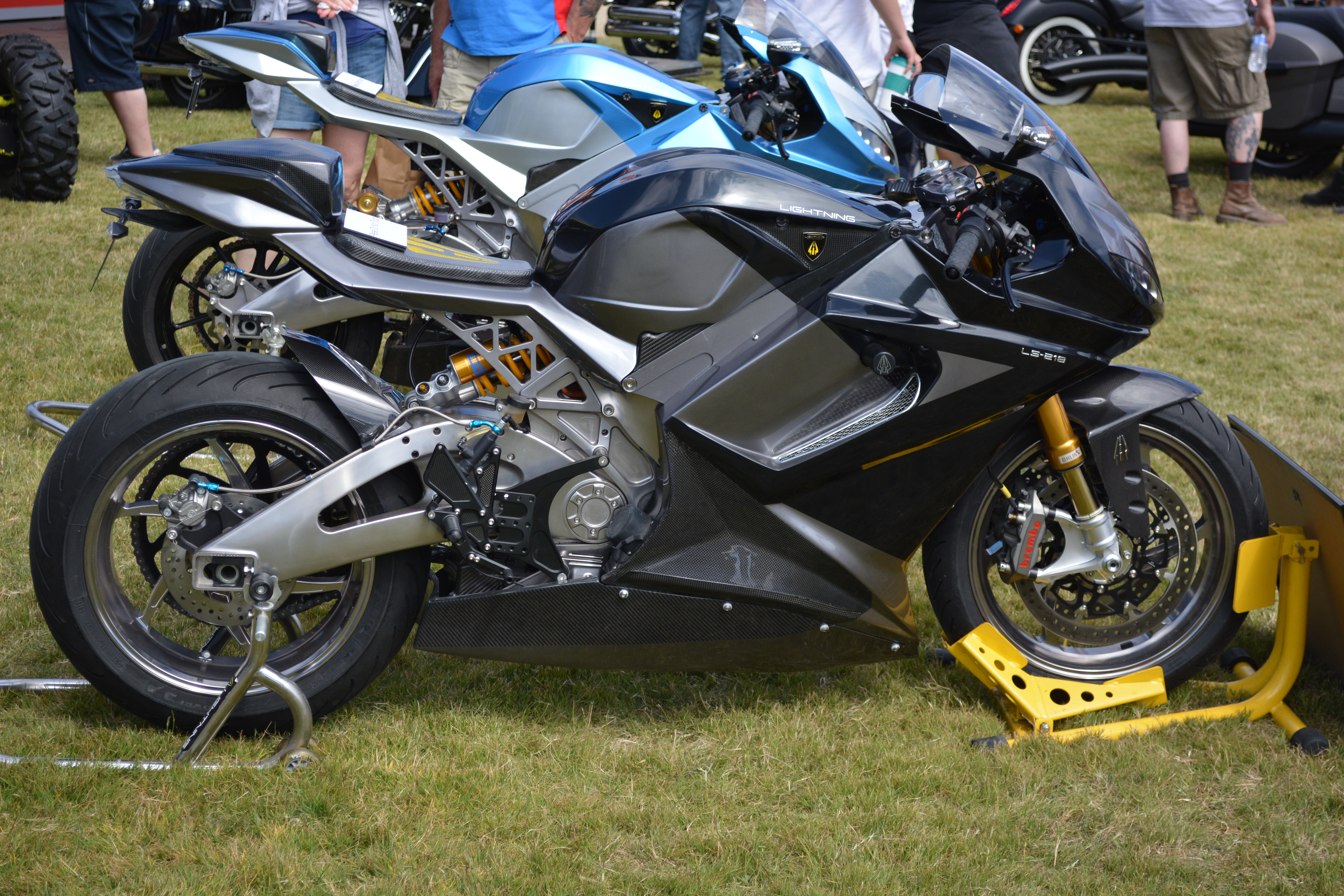
Lightning LS-218 Electric

As an independent consultant, he has worked with the world's top motorcycle manufacturers, including Ducati, Honda, Triumph, Aprilia, Harley-Davidson, Kymco, Voxan and Kawasaki. For nearly two decades, he was senior consultant to Bajaj Auto in India, helping the company transform the market for smaller-capacity domestic models such as the Pulsar. As well as major commissions, Kerr has worked with smaller enterprises and start-up companies, creating the Midual Roadster, the Boxer 654, VB1 & B2, Voxan Scrambler, the Fischer MRX, and more recently, the 218 mph street version of the Lightning electric land speed record holder.

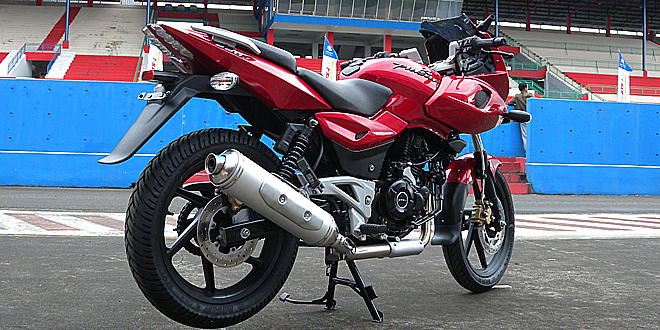
Bajaj Pulsar 220

In addition to his design activities, Kerr was lecturer at the Art Center College of Design in Europe, and is co-founder and President of the Motorcycle Design Association. Best known as a contributor of articles and illustrations to diverse motorcycle magazines, he is also Creative Director of Motovisions, California, along with other designers offering a variety of motorcycle-based design services.
