= Fischer Motor Company =

- Founder: Daniel Fischer
- Headquarters: Pocomoke City, Maryland, United States
- Products: Motorcycles
- Website: fischer1.com

Fischer Motor Company is a US-based sport motorcycle manufacturer. Their MRX 650 is a sport bike built around a 90-degree V-twin engine and one-piece, twin spar, aluminum perimeter frame. Alan Cathcart of Motorcyclist magazine in his 2006 test review, called the MRX, "the most important new American motorcycle in generations."

Company founder Daniel Fischer developed the company's first motorcycle for mass-production, the MRX 650 using suppliers including an EADS (Airbus) subsidiary for engineering, Harley-Davidson and Michael Jordan Motorsports contractor Gemini Technology Systems for frame development, and various companies related to US-based heavy equipment and automotive suppliers for other components. The original platform is based upon a 1990s era Grand Prix chassis. In contrast to Buell Motorcycle Company, Fischer intended not to "reinvent the wheel" with any radical design concepts, but to "just take existing technology and fine-tune it," Fischer told Cycle World in 2003.

Styling for the new motorcycle was done by British designer Glynn Kerr. In earlier stages, there were plans to produce 1,000–1,500 cc (61–92 cu in) Rotax-based 90° V-twins. Rotax subsequently voided an agreement with Fischer in order to supply engines to Harley's Buell, with the Rotax 1000cc v-twin which had been used in Aprilia products and Fischer's first prototype ultimately supplied in a revised version for Buell 1125-series products.

As of April 2009, Fischer had begun shipping units, and in October 2009, they announced a production increase for the 2010 model year. Fischer appears to have ceased production in 2012.

A "few dozen" bikes were produced during Fischer's three years of operation.

Fischer MRX shown in Australia

In 2015, an Indian motorcycle blog reported that Fischer had plans to make an entry into India with its new 150cc bikes, likely to be named Fischer MRX 150.
