= TVS Apache =

Motorcycle

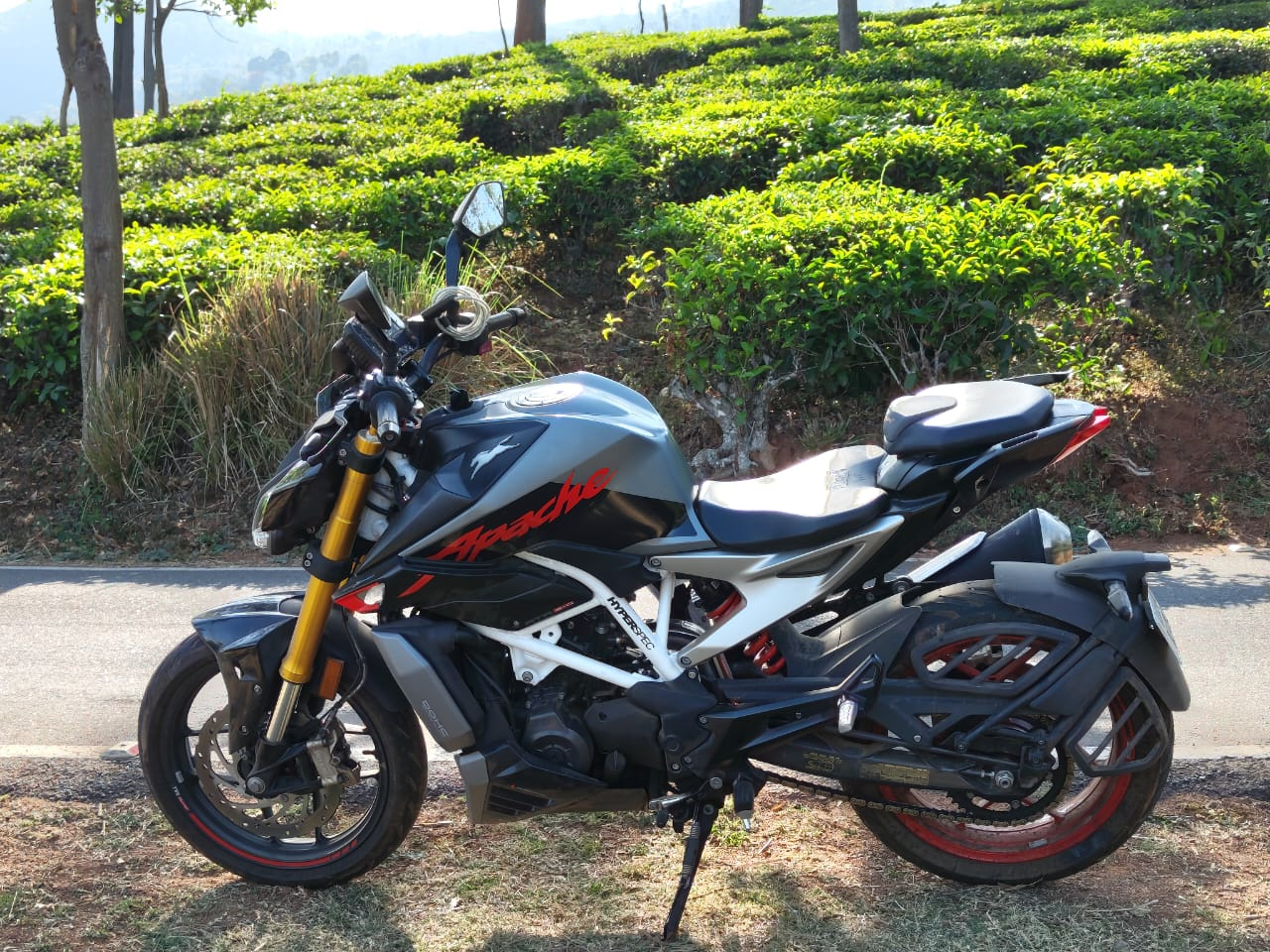
- 2023 Apache RTR 310
- Manufacturer: TVS Motor Company
- Production: 2005–present
- Class: Standard, Sport bike
- Engine: 159.7 cm³, 177.4 cm³, 197.75 cm³, 312.2 cm³, 312.12 cm³, Single Cylinder, SI, 4-stroke, 2 valves, 4 valves, Air-cooled, Oil-cooled, Liquid Cooled
- Related: Apache RR 310

The TVS Apache (/əˈpætʃi/ ə-PATCH-ee) is a brand of motorcycle made since 2005 by TVS Motors. As of 2025, more than 6 million Apaches are on the road. As of September 2025, the company sells six variants of the TVS Apache. The differences between each variant being the engine displacement, the options on offer and performance characteristics. The abbreviation 'RTR' in the names of the motorcycles refer to 'Racing Throttle Response'.

== History ==
TVS which partnered with Suzuki for 19 years had brought out several two-stroke motorcycles in India. When the emission norms in the country changed, a need for more fuel efficient and less polluting four-stroke motorcycles suddenly came into being. However Suzuki at the time was globally known to produce two-stroke motorcycles and did not have strong R&D in the four-stroke department. All this led to the late introduction of the TVS-Suzuki Fiero in 2000 which was specifically developed for the Indian market.

At the time there was also an upcoming market for the low displacement performance motorcycles in India which can be related to the success of the Hero Honda CBZ. The Suzuki Fiero being a relatively powerful motorcycle in the segment, was well received. After the separation of TVS and Suzuki in 2001, TVS continued the production of the Fiero and its iterations under the name TVS Fiero, TVS Fiero FX.

In 2005, to enter the 150 cm^{3} engine displacement category of performance motorcycles which was then dominated by the Bajaj Pulsar, TVS introduced the TVS Apache 150 IE-Surge, the first of the TVS Apache series of Motorcycles. It was a product of TVS' own R&D which included many changes on their existing Fiero 147 cm^{3} Engine and as a result had an increased power output of 13.5 bhp from 12 bhp and better efficiency. There were also major improvements in design, suspension, brakes, frame and styling. The company claimed that the Apache had the highest power to weight ratio in its class and was the quickest for that reason.

The successors and current variants of the TVS Apache have engines based on the same platform but have significant design improvements such as an oversquare engine, 4- valves, balance shaft; technical advancements such as oil cooling, ram-air assist cooling (not to be confused with ram-air intake), fuel injection and performance improvements. However the TVS Apache RR 310 and TVS Apache RTR 310 are an exception and are based on the same engine and technology of BMW G310R.

In February 2019, an ABS equipped variant of the Apache RTR 160 4V was announced and on February 28, the ABS equipped version of the older Apache RTR 160 was launched. In January 2020, a revision of the TVS Apache RR 310 was launched in India powered by a BSVI-compliant Engine.

== Models ==
All TVS Apache models
Variant	Engine capacity (cc)	Power (HP)	Torque (Nm)	Max speed (km/h)	Ref(s)
Apache 150 IE-Surge	147.5	13.5	12.3	112	
Apache RTR 160cc (ABS variant)	159.7	15.12	13.03	118	
Apache RTR 160 4V	159.7	15.52	13.9	113	
Apache RTR 160 4V EFI (ABS variant)	159.7	15.52	13.9	114	
Apache RTR 165RP	164.9	18.9	14.2	123	
Apache RTR 180	177.4	16.78	15.5	124	
Apache RTR 180 ABS	177.4	16.78	15.5	124	
Apache RTR 200 4V	197.5	20.5	18.1	127	
Apache RTR 200 4V Race Edition 2.0 (ABS and non ABS versions available, carburetor version was available in BS IV)	197.5	20.5	18.1	127	
Apache RTR 200 FI E100 (Ethanol powered)	197.5	21	18.1	129	
Apache RTR 200 BS6 (ABS, Riding modes, Preload adjustable front & rear suspension)	197.5	20.6 (Sport), 17.5 (Urban, Rain)	17.1 (Sport), 16.5 (Urban, Rain)	141	
Apache RR 310	312.2	34	27.3	165	
Apache RTR 310	312.12	35.08	28.7	150	
Apache RTX 300 Adventure	299.1	36	28.5	150	

- Discontinued

== Design and styling ==
The Apache was the first bike in India with a petal disc brake, which offers better heat dispersion thereby allowing fewer brake fades. The same bike introduced ABS in a 2 wheeler for the first time in India.

== Comfort and handling ==
Previous versions of Apache had a wheelbase of 1,260 mm (50 inches) which resulted in better turning in at the expense of stability. The Apache RTR 180 ABS introduced Dual Channel ABS to the lineup as well as the country in 2011.

In 2020, BS6 compliant engines were released in all their line up which saw significant improvements in RTR 200 4V and RR 310 models in terms of riding, handling and integrated tech.

== Awards ==
TVS Apache RTR 180 won Performance Bike Of The Year (2009) from Business Standard Motoring Awards. The TVS Apache RTR 200 4V has been awarded the NDTV Motorcycle of the Year up to 250cc for 2017.

== Gallery ==
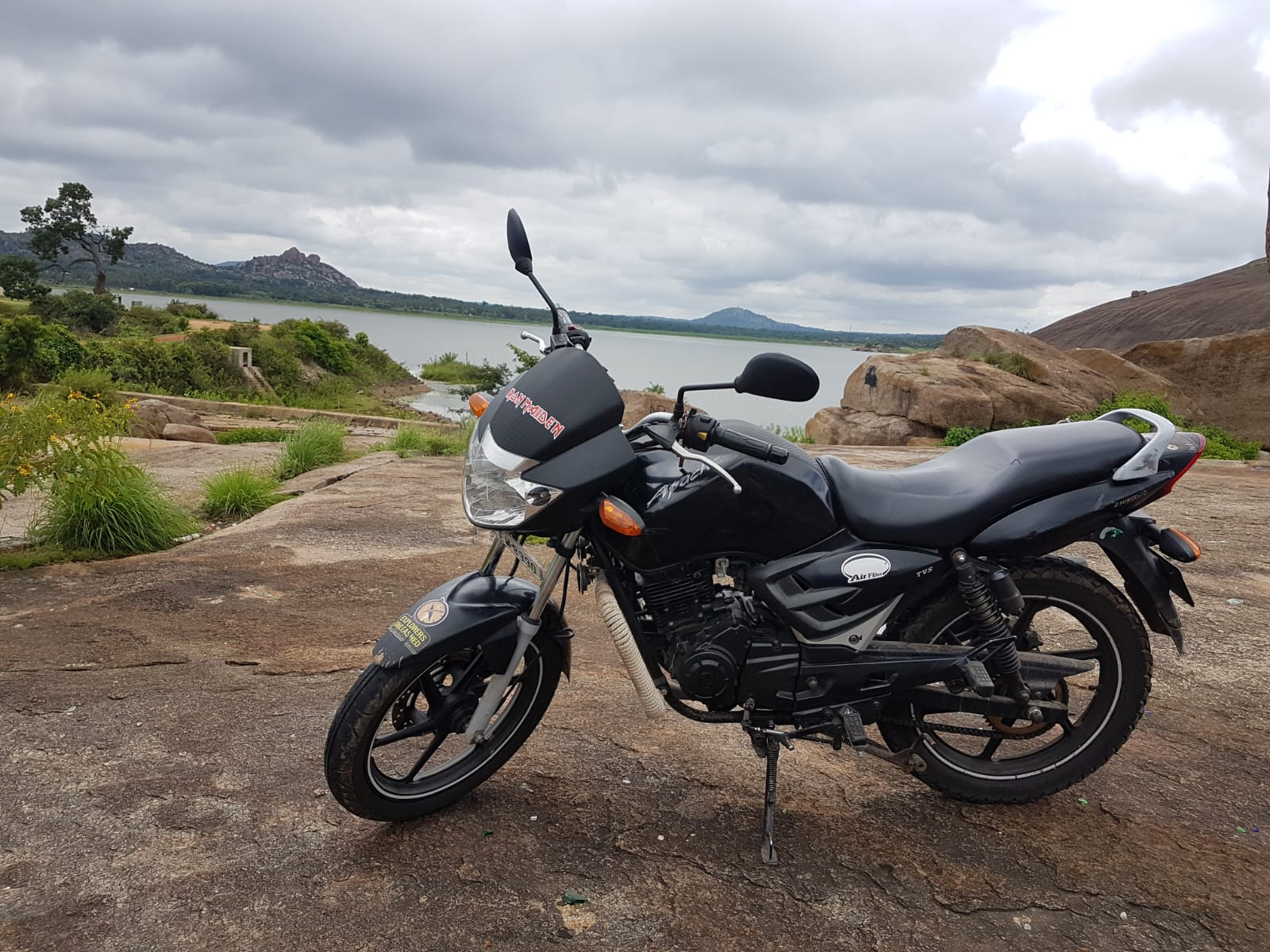
2006 Apache 150 IE Surge

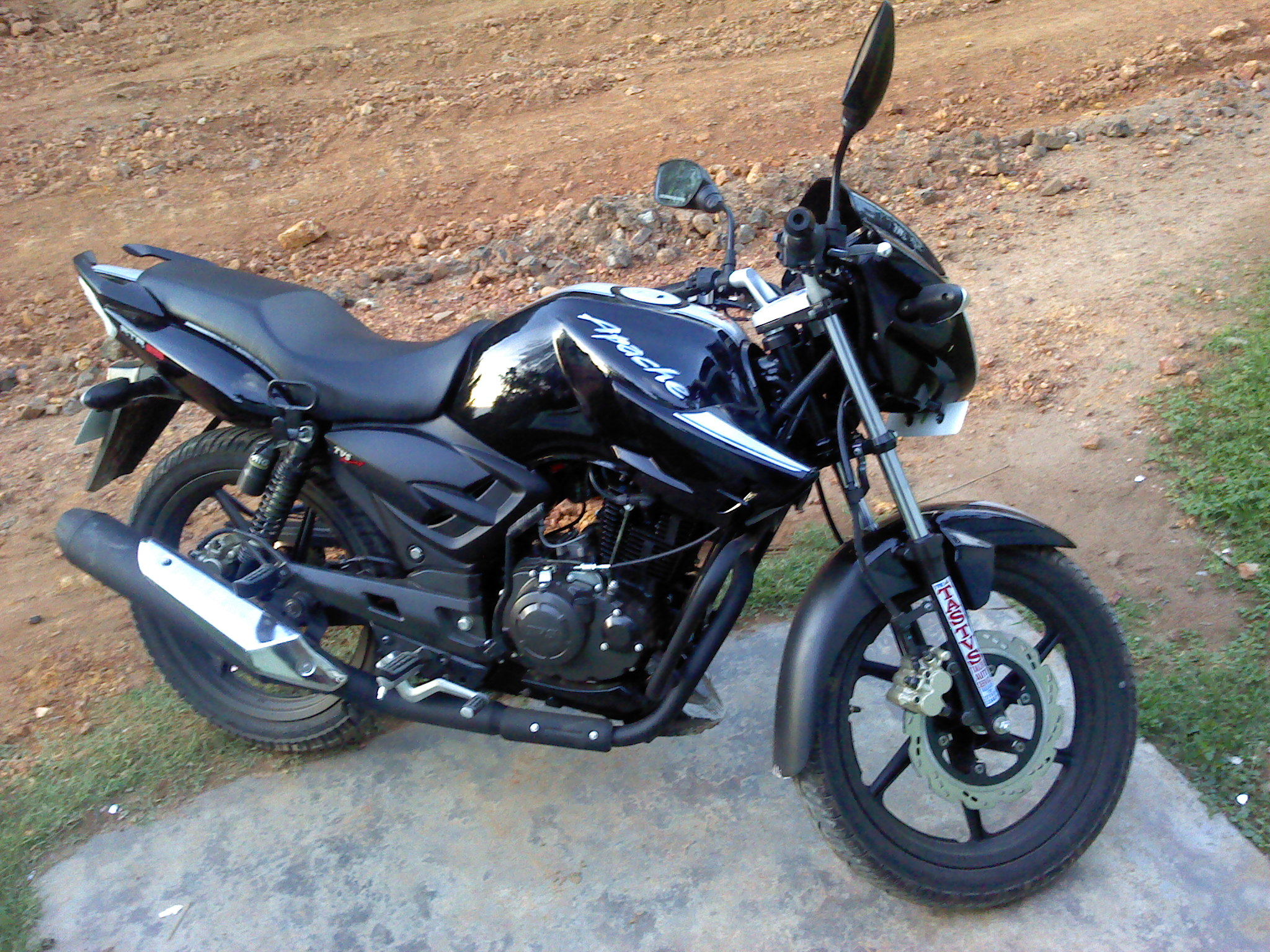
2008 TVS Apache RTR 160

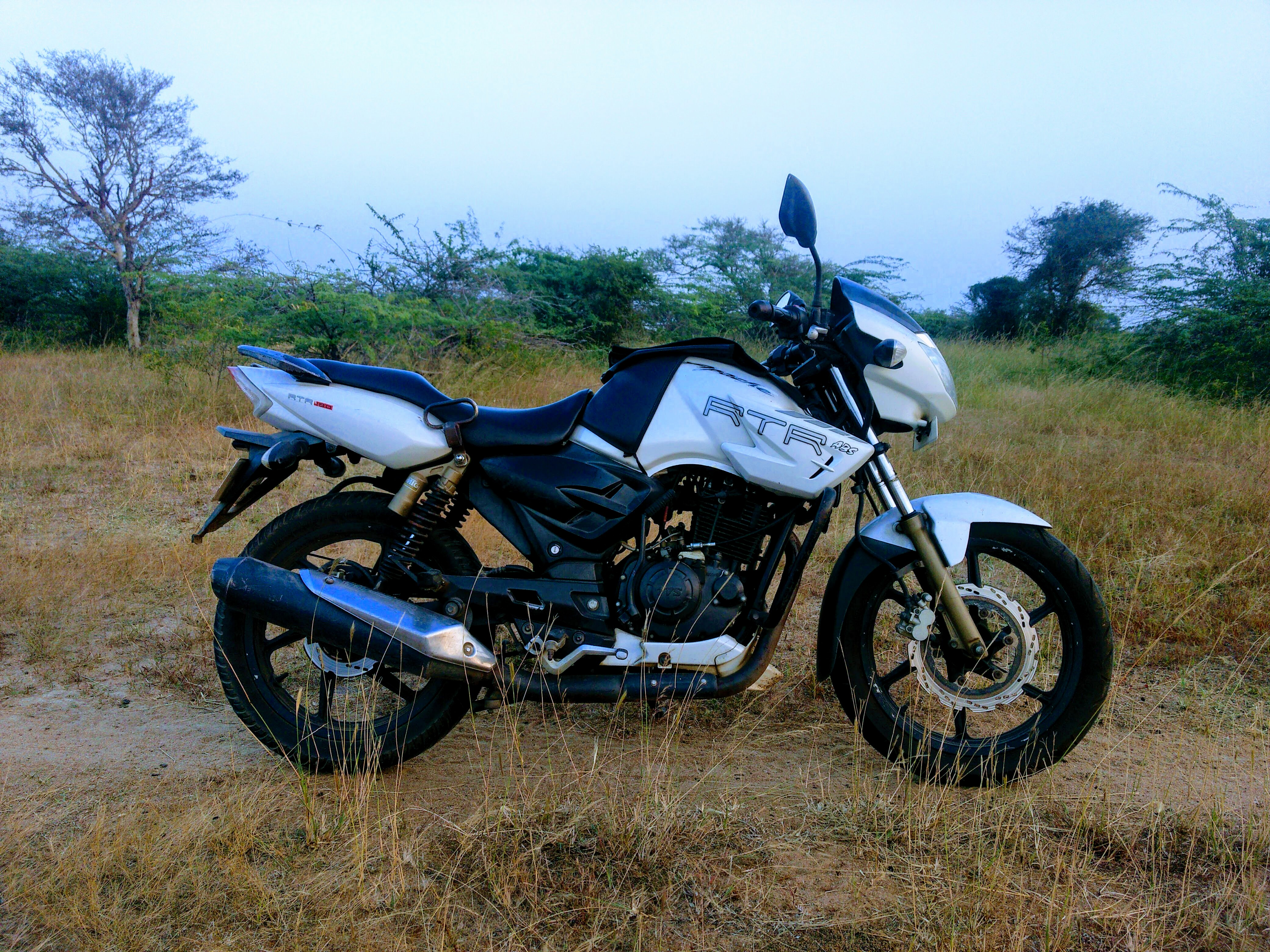
2011 TVS Apache RTR 180 ABS

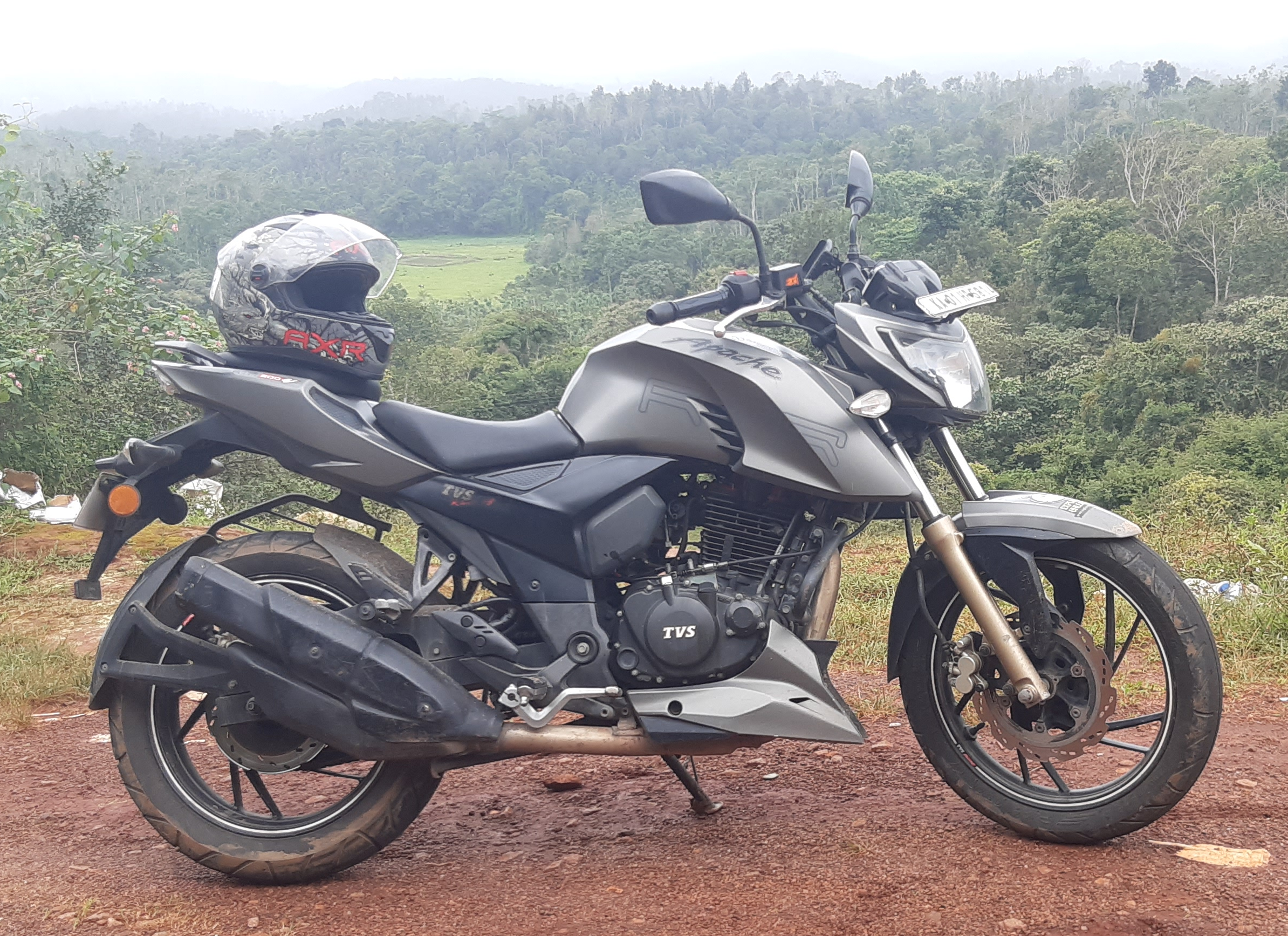
2016 TVS Apache RTR 200 4V

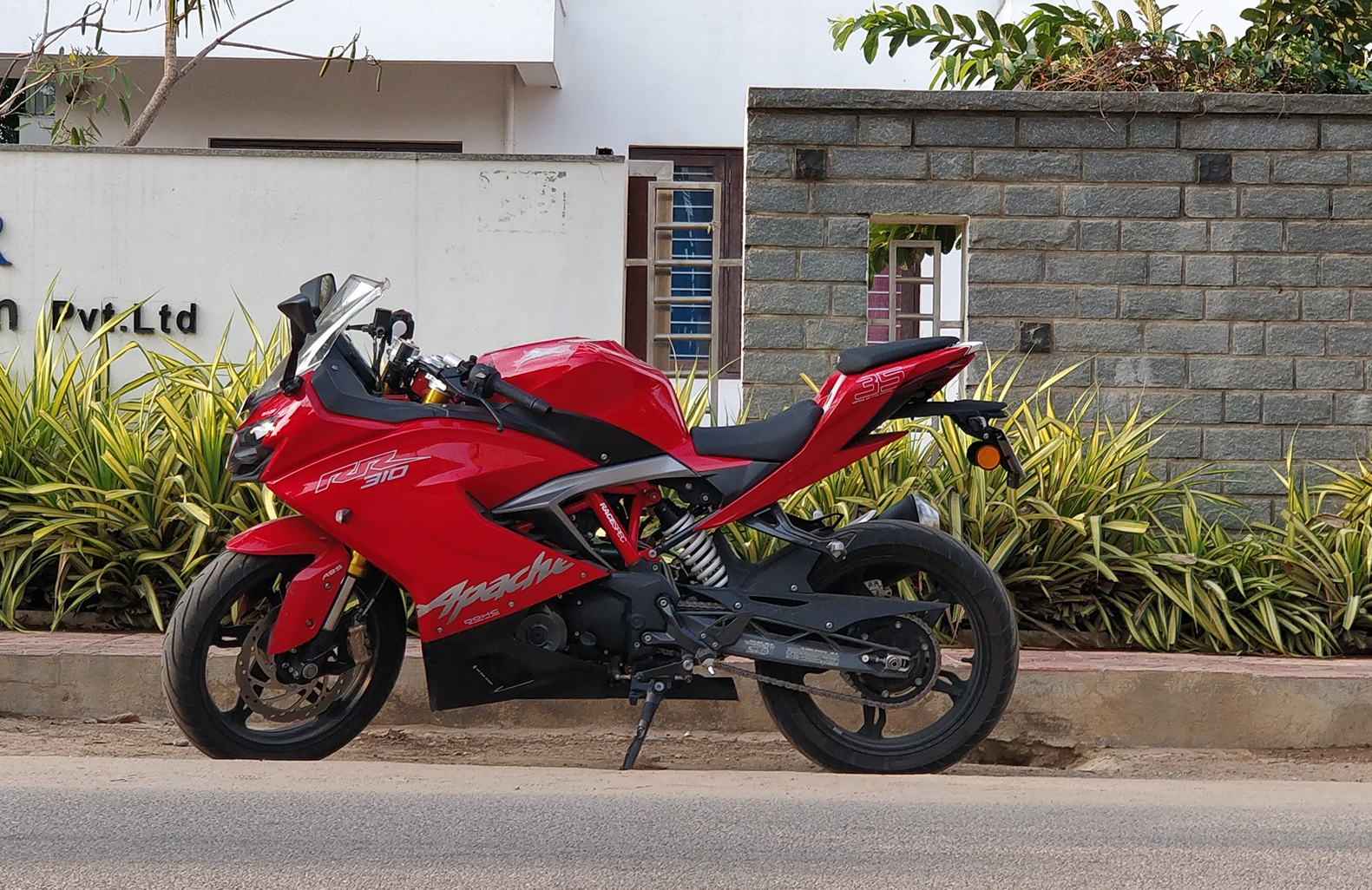
2019 TVS Apache RR 310

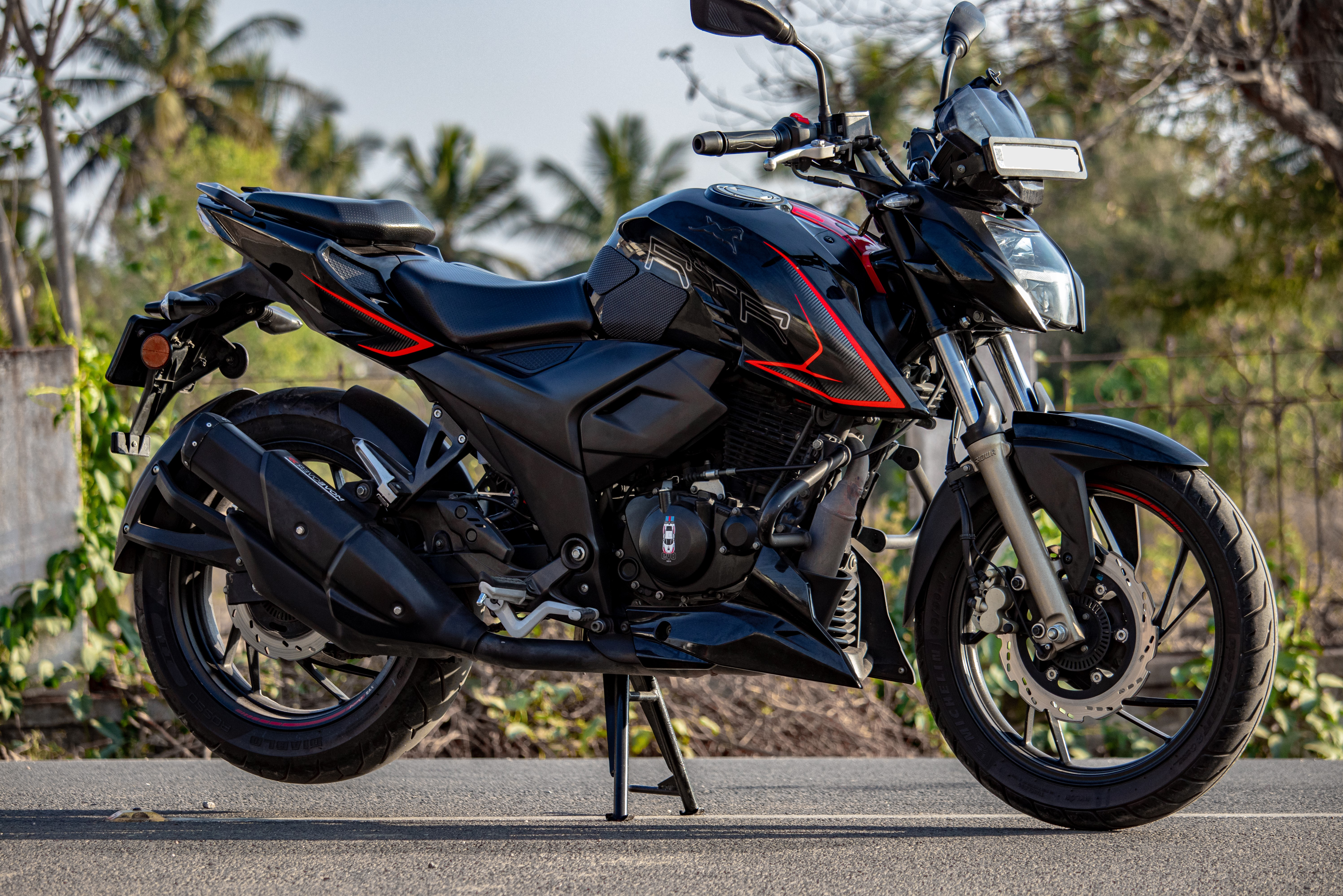
2023 Apache RTR 200

TVS Apache RTX 300
