= TVS Apache RR 310 =

Sports bike

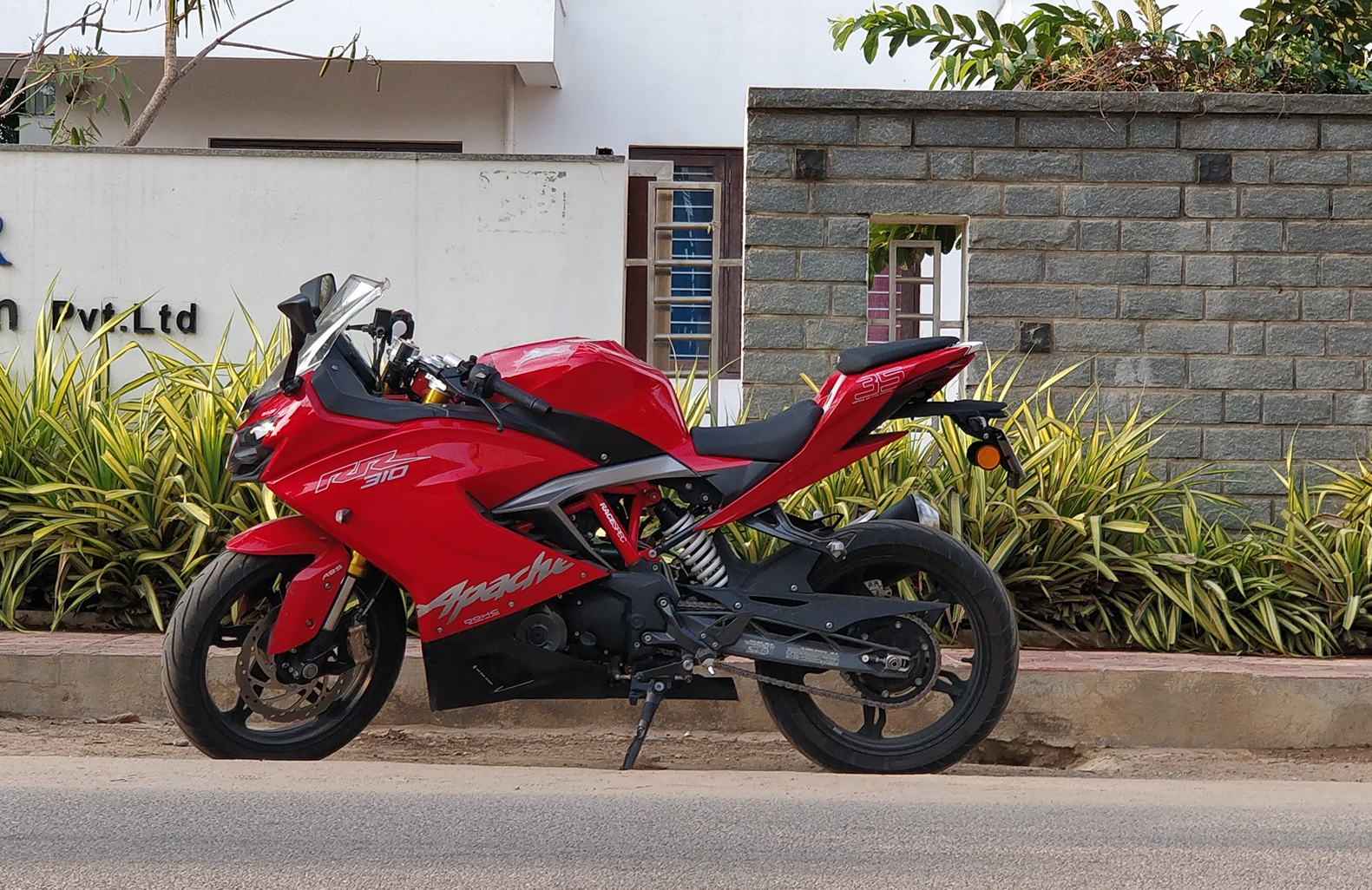
- Manufacturer: TVS Motor Company
- Also called: BMW G310RR
- Production: 2017–Present
- Assembly: Hosur, Tamil Nadu, India
- Class: Sport bike
- Engine: 312.2cc liquid-cooled, four-stroke, single cylinder, 4v, DOHC, reverse inclined
- Bore / stroke: 80 mm × 62.1 mm (3.15 in × 2.44 in)
- Compression ratio: 12.17:1
- Top speed: 164 km/h (102 mph)
- Power: 28 kW (38 hp)@ 9,800 rpm
- Torque: 29 N⋅m (21 lbf⋅ft) @ 7900 rpm
- Transmission: 6-speed
- Frame type: Aluminium Trellis frame
- Suspension: Front: KYB inverted cartridge telescopic fork Rear: 2-arm aluminium die-cast swing-arm, mono tube floating piston gas assisted shock
- Brakes: Front: Four piston radial fixed caliper 300mm Petal Disc with ABS; Rear: Single piston axial floating caliper 240mm Petal Disc with ABS
- Tires: Michelin Road 5 Front: 110/70-R17 M/C 54H; Rear: 150/60-R17 M/C 66H
- Wheelbase: 1,365 mm (53.7 in)
- Dimensions: L: 2,001 mm (78.8 in); W: 786 mm (30.9 in); H: 1,135 mm (44.7 in)
- Seat height: 810 mm (32 in)
- Weight: 174 kg (384 lb) (wet)
- Fuel capacity: 11 L (2.4 imp gal; 2.9 US gal)
- Related: TVS Apache

The TVS Apache Race Replica 310 is a sport bike made by the TVS Motor Company in collaboration with BMW Motorrad that was launched in India on December 6, 2017. It uses a 312.2cc single-cylinder, four-stroke, SI, liquid-cooled, DOHC reverse inclined engine. BMW Motorrad released a rebadged version of the TVS Apache RR 310 called the BMW G 310 RR.

Although the engine of the Apache RR 310 is from BMW Motorrad's BMW G 310 R platform, the motorcycle was entirely designed by TVS in India. It is the company's first fully-faired production motorcycle. The TVS Apache RR310 is powered by 312.2cc BS6 engine which develops a power of 38 bhp and a torque of 29 Nm. With both front and rear disc brakes, the TVS Apache RR310 comes up with anti-locking braking system (ABS).

== Design ==
The Apache RR 310 is a fully faired motorcycle with a supersport style seating configuration inspired from sharks. The engine uses a reverse inclined configuration. The bike has dual LED projector headlamps.

=== Electronics ===
The RR 310 has variety of electronics compared to other motorcycles in the Apache series like the RTR 200 4V.

Electronics:-

- Anti-lock braking system: Dual channel
- Rear wheel lift-off protection
- Electronic throttle control: It has four settings, namely Track mode, Sport mode, Urban mode, and Rain mode. Urban and Rain modes limit engine output and maximum speed.
- Electronic fuel injection
- Race computer: Provides various tools such as timers and telemetry, and ergonomics for racing and sports.

=== Mechanics ===
- Slipper clutch

== Updates ==
=== 2019 Update ===
In May 2019, the motorcycle was updated with a slipper clutch, and the company also introduced a new colour named 'Phantom Black', which replaced the old 'Sinister Black' colour.

=== 2020 Update ===
In January 2020, the motorcycle was launched to cater to the newest emission norms of India known as BS6. Ride by wire throttle gives this motorcycle a better throttle response. Power and torque output remained unchanged. A new colour named 'Titanium Black' was introduced, which replaced the recently introduced 'Phantom Black' colour. The motorcycle was also updated with features like colour TFT screen instrument cluster with mobile phone connectivity and 4 riding modes (Urban, Rain, Sport, and Track). The urban and Rain modes produce low power and torque which offers better fuel consumption. The other updates were newer Michelin Road 5 tyres and the Glide Thru Technology Plus.

=== 2021 Update ===
In August 2021, the new 2021 model of TVS Apache RR310 was launched. The new model has the addition of new features like adjustable suspension with 20- step rebound damping on the left fork and 20-step compression damping on the right and 15mm pre-load adjustment. .

=== 2024 Update ===
On 16 September 2024, the MY24 Apache RR 310 was launched in India. the updated Apache RR 310 now gets Side winglets, also introduced the new Bomber Grey colour. the updated 312cc engine increased to 38 hp.

=== 2025 Update ===
2025 TVS Apache RR 310

In April 2025, TVS Motor Company launched the MY25 Apache RR 310 which gets the eight-spoke alloy wheels from Apache RTR 310, OBD-2B compliant Engine and new Sepang Blue colour.

The TVS Apache RTR 310 is a streetfighter motorcycle derived from the TVS Apache RR 310. It shares the same 312.2 cc single-cylinder engine platform developed in collaboration with BMW Motorrad but features a naked-sport design, upright ergonomics, and revised tuning aimed at enhancing urban performance and agility.

== Performance ==
The motorcycle's performance numbers as provided by the company are:-

- Max. speed: 165 km/h (103 mph)
- Acceleration (0-2sec): 46.7 km/h (29.0 mph).
- 0-60 km/h (37 mph): (time in sec): 2.04s.
- 0-100 km/h (62 mph): (time in sec): 6.17s.

== International launch ==
In September 2018, TVS launched the bike in Nepal, and in Peru in December 2018.

== See also ==
- TVS Apache
