= TVS Sport =

- Manufacturer: TVS Motor Company
- Production: 2007–present
- Engine: 109.7 cc (6.69 cu in), four stroke, single
- Power: 8.18 bhp @ 7350 rpm
- Torque: 8.7 Nm @ 4500 rpm
- Transmission: 4-speed manual
- Suspension: Telescopic hydraulics front forks (110mm),5 stage adjustable rear shock (79mm)
- Brakes: Front:130 mm drum, rear:110 mm drum
- Fuel capacity: 10 L (2.2 imp gal; 2.6 US gal)
- Related: TVS Star City

TVS Sport (known as TVS Metro in Bangladesh) is a 110 cc motorcycle commuter bike manufactured in India by TVS Motor Company. Initially launched in 2007, it received updates in 2015 and 2017.

The design features in areas of style, mileage, and pricing created a demand for this vehicle among new-generation motorcyclists. According to the company, the enhanced features focused on the fuel efficiency of the motorcycle. In 2017 TVS Motor Company launched the TVS Sport with the BS-IV engine which comes with a large fuel tank with 10-litre capacity. It is one of the high fuel tank capacity models in the 110 cc segment in the Indian motorcycle market.

The 2017 TVS Sport is suspended over standard telescopic forks up front and 5-step adjustable twin shocks in the rear. The bike measures 1,950 mm in length, 705 mm in width, and 1,080 in height with a ground clearance of 170 mm. The Brakes include a 130mm drum in the front and a 110 mm unit in the rear. The all-gear electric start enables the vehicle to start at any gear. The vehicle sports body graphics, a chrome-plated exhaust muzzle, and a compact taillight.

== Engine ==
TVS Sport comes with a 4 stroke Duralife engine powered by a 109.7cc single-cylinder motor. TVS Sport's Duralife Engine comes with Roller Cam Follower Technology that reduces friction and provides less stress on the engine leading to more efficient fuel consumption as stated by the company. This engine enables a churning out 7.8 PS of peak power 7,350 rpm and 8.7 Nm of maximum torque at 4,000 rpm. TVS Sport achieved a record on-road mileage of 110.12km per litre.

== JD Power Award ==
TVS Sport is Ranked No.1 amongst Economy Segment Motorcycles in the J.D. Power APEAL Study 2015 and 2017. This prestigious award makes TVS Sport "The Most Appealing Economy Motorcycle".

== See also ==
- TVS Motor
