= Edgar Heinrich =

German automobile and motorbike designer

Edgar Heinrich (born c. 1958) is a German automobile designer and motorcycle designer. He began his career at BMW Motorrad as head of vehicle design (motorcycles) from 1986 to 2009, responsible for visual design of the R1150GS and R1200GS, The K1200R and K1200S, and head of the S1000RR sportbike design team. At Bajaj Auto from 2009 to 2012, he was vice president of product development, responsible for both automotive and motorcycle design, including the Pulsar 200NS.

He returned to BMW Motorrad in July, 2012 to take over from David Robb as director of design.
