= Midual =

MIDUAL

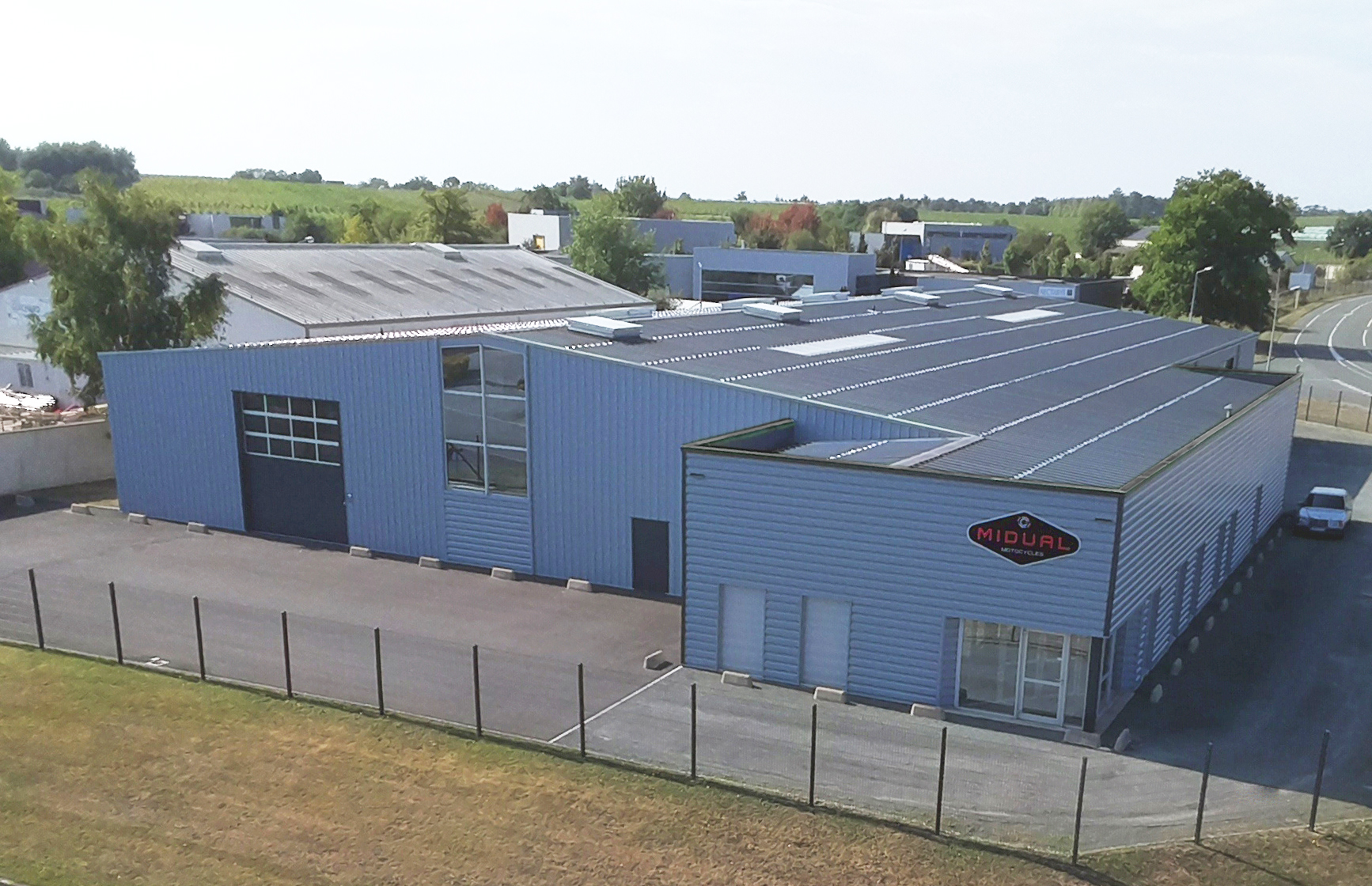
- Midual factory near Angers, France
- Industry: Motorcycles manufacturer
- Founded: 1997
- Founder: Olivier Midy and François Midy
- Headquarters: Juigné-sur-Loire, France
- Products: Motorcycles
- Number of employees: 10 employees in 2020
- Website: www.midual.com

Midual is a French high-end motorcycle manufacturer. Founded in 1997 by brothers Olivier and François Midy, the company is headquartered in Angers, France. A first prototype, the Midual 900, was presented in 1999 at the Paris Motor Show, but sufficient funding could not be found and the project was abandoned.

In August 2014 the brand announced a new model at the Pebble Beach Concours d'Elegance, the Midual Type 1. The announced price is £140,000 (€155,000), making it one of the most expensive motorcycles in the world. The Type 1 is produced in a limited series.

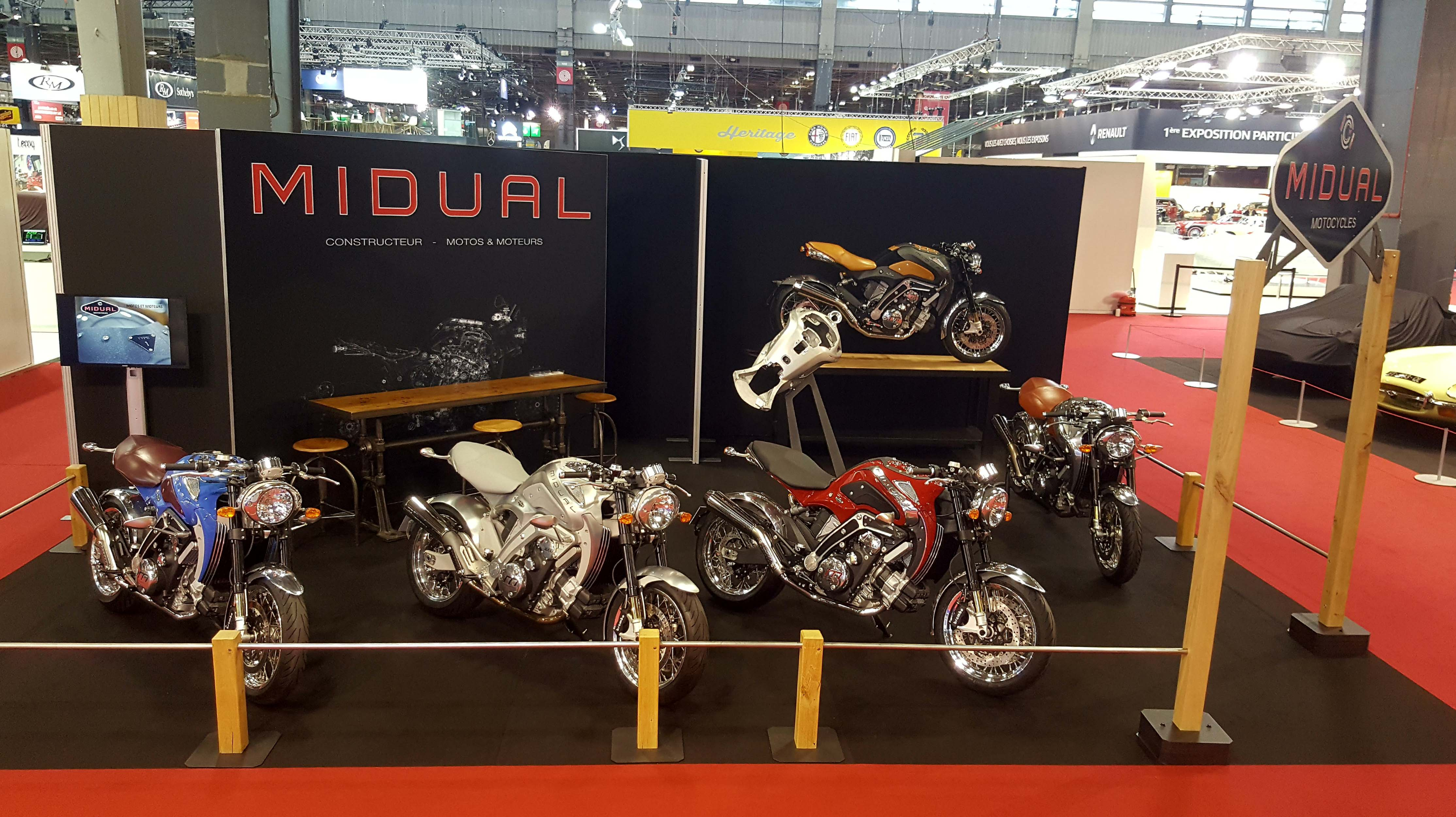
Midual booth with 5 Midual Type 1 at Rétromobile 2020

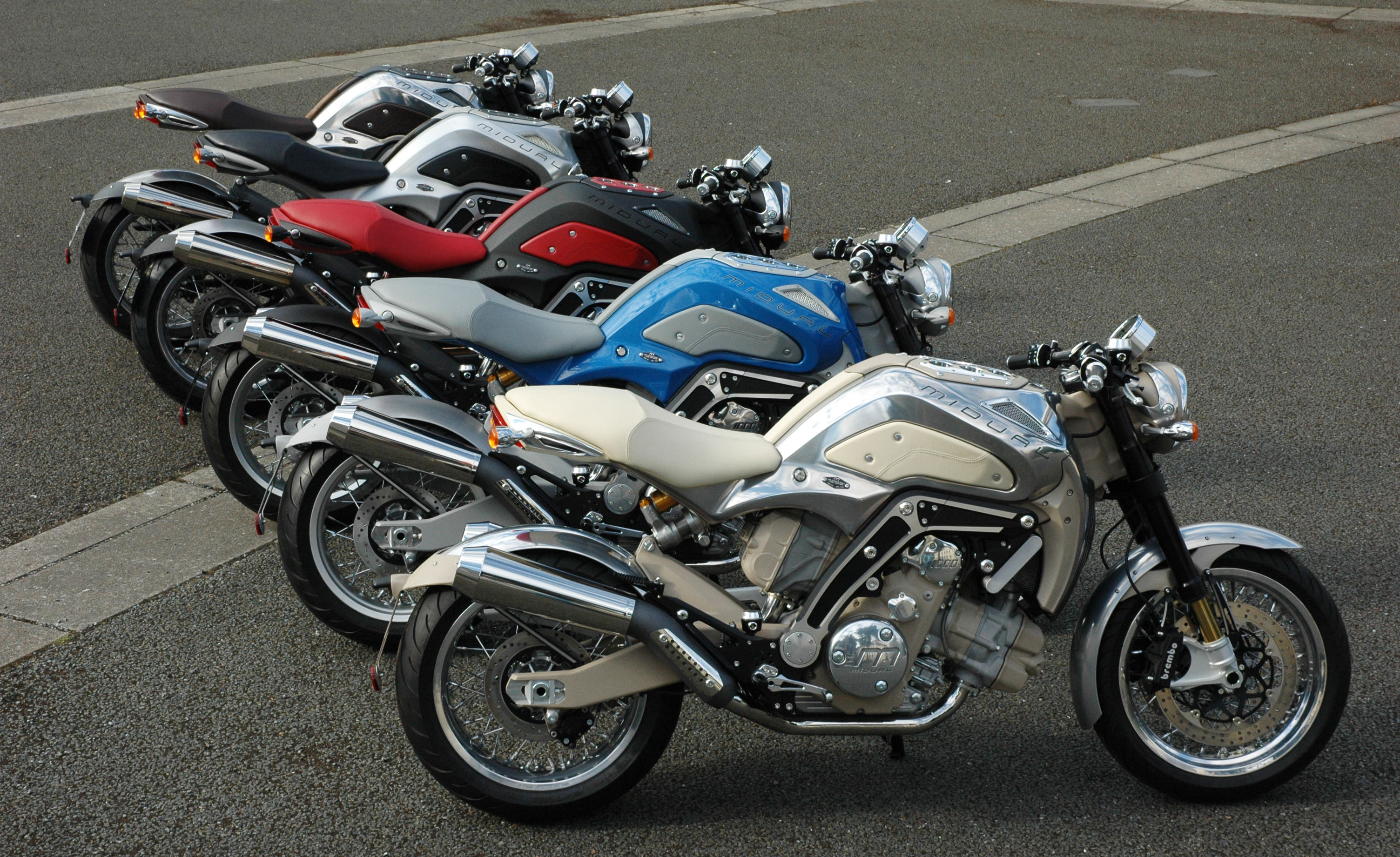
5 models of Midual Type 1

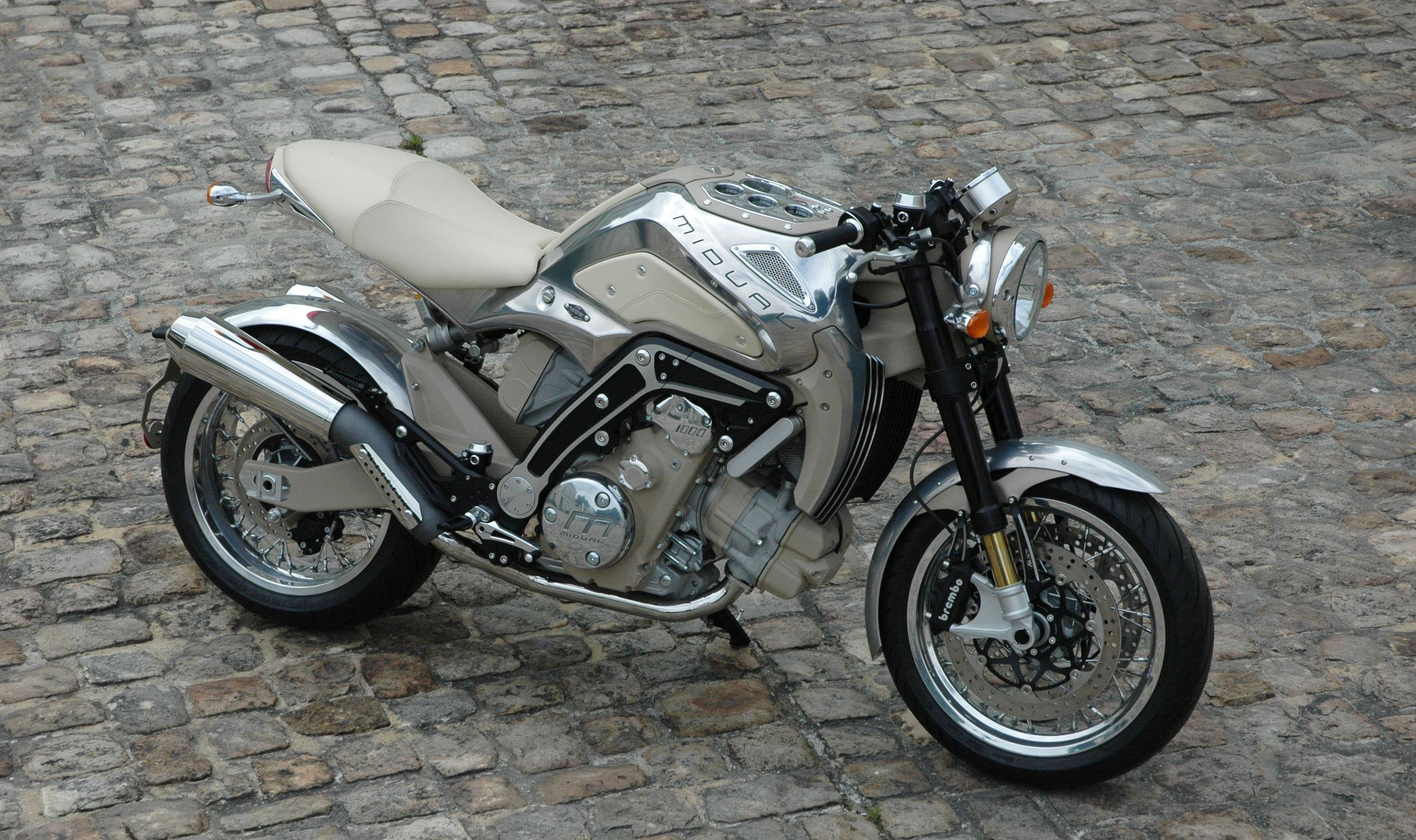
Midual Type 1 - Polished monocoque

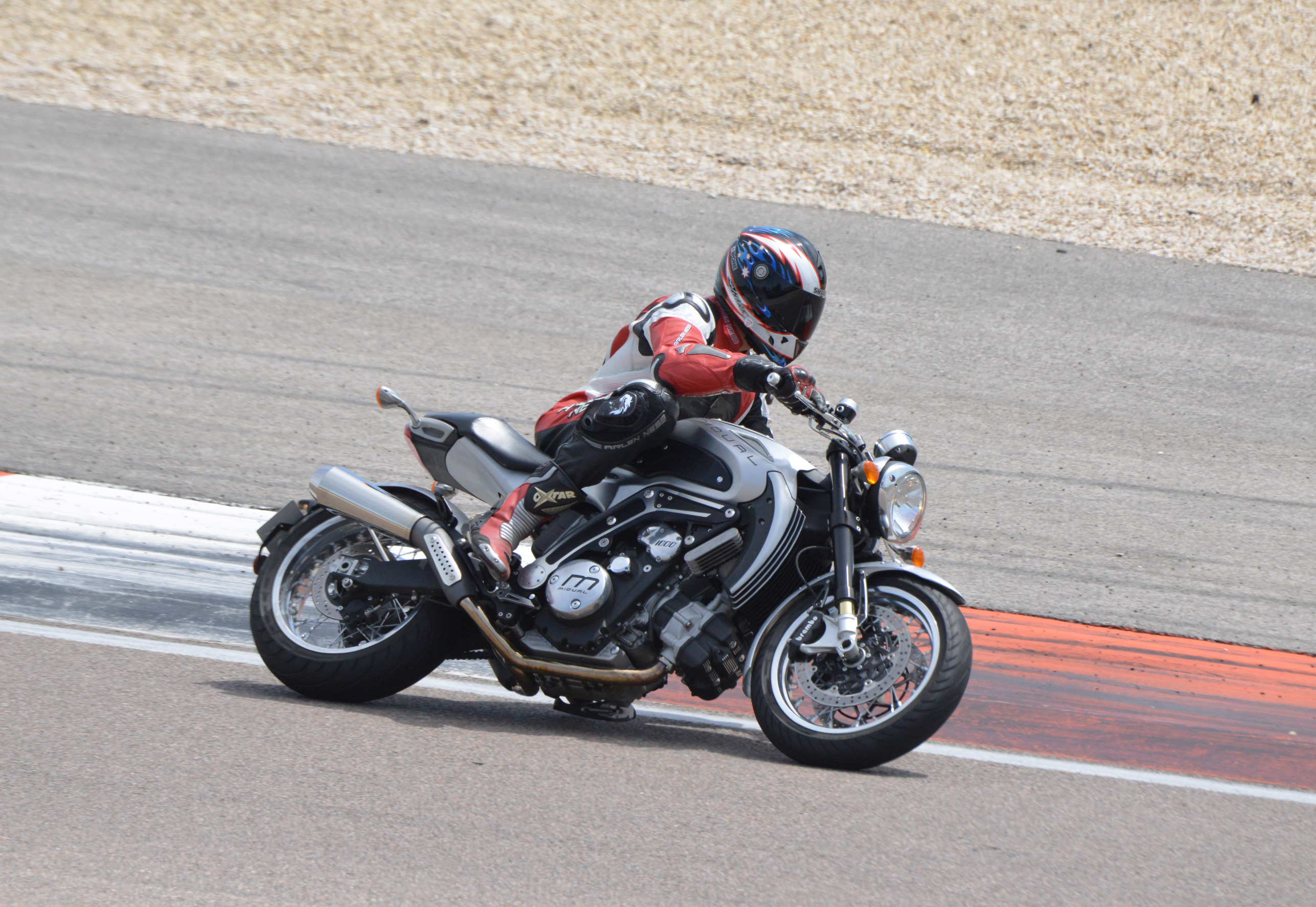
Midual Type 1 at Coupes Moto Légende (Dijon-Prenois)
