= Bajaj Pulsar NS200 =

Sports bike by Bajaj Auto

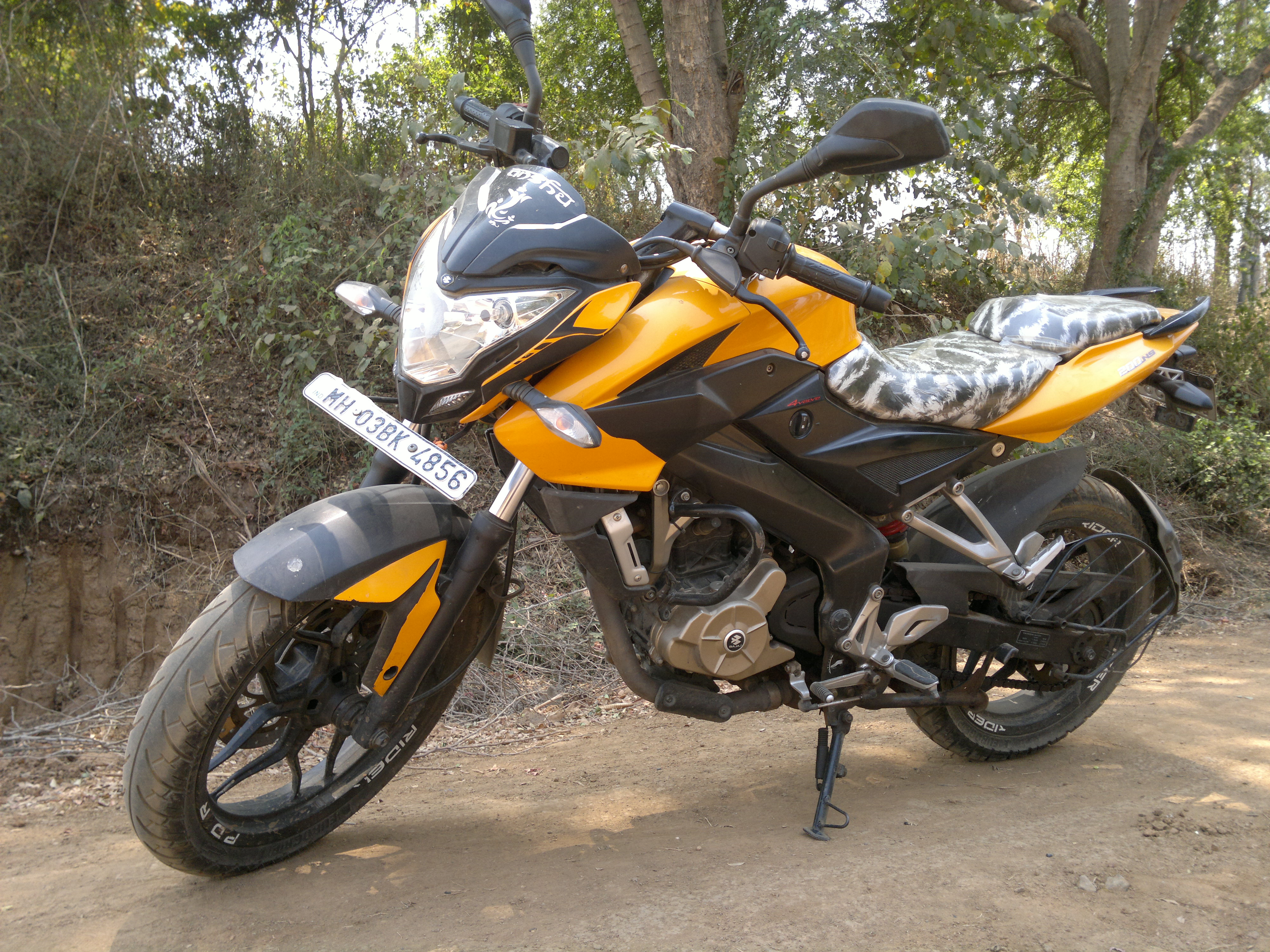
- Production: 2012–2015 (as Pulsar 200NS); 2017-present (as Pulsar NS200)
- Assembly: India
- Class: Streetfighter
- Engine: 199.5 cc (12.17 cu in) 4 valve SOHC liquid-cooled single cylinder
- Bore / stroke: 72 mm × 49 mm (2.8 in × 1.9 in)
- Compression ratio: 11.1:1
- Top speed: 140 km/h
- Power: 24.5 PS @ 9500
- Torque: 18.3 Nm @ 8000 rpm
- Ignition type: CD Triple Spark Ignition
- Transmission: 6-speed Sequential (Cassette-type)
- Frame type: Pressed steel perimeter frame
- Suspension: Front: Endurance™ Inverted (USD) Telescopic Forks; Rear: 7 step adjustable Endurance™ Nitrox mono-shock suspension
- Brakes: Grimeca™ Hydraulic Disc Brakes with Bosch™ Dual channel ABS: Front: 300mm; Rear: 230mm
- Tires: Front: 100/80 - 17 - tubeless Rear: 130/70 - 17 - tubeless
- Wheelbase: 1,363 mm (53.7 in)
- Dimensions: L: 2,017 mm (79.4 in); W: 804 mm (31.7 in); H: 1,075 mm (42.3 in)
- Seat height: 805mm
- Fuel capacity: 12 L (2.6 imp gal; 3.2 US gal)
- Oil capacity: 1200ml
- Fuel consumption: 35 km/L (city) and 40 km/L (highway)
- Related: Bajaj RS200; Bajaj NS160; Bajaj NS125; Bajaj NS400Z; KTM Duke 200; KTM RC200

The Bajaj Pulsar NS200, previously known as Bajaj Pulsar 200NS or Bajaj Pulsar 200 Naked Sports, is a sports bike made by Indian motorcycle manufacturer Bajaj Auto.

== History ==
The Pulsar NS200 was Developed as part of the KTM-Bajaj Joint Partnership project which saw Bajaj creating a derivative of the 200cc Engine found in the KTM Duke 200. The Original 200NS was launched in 2012, featuring a carburetted 200cc Liquid Cooled Single cylinder engine. The Motorcycle was briefly discontinued in 2015 following lackluster sales, but was revived in 2017 featuring the new "NS200" Moniker. In 2020, the motorcycle got an update in form of Fuel Injections to comply with stringent BS6 Norms. The Bike was further updated in 2023, Receiving Upside-Down Forks and New Grimeca brakes replacing ByBres with Dual-channel ABS as standard.

The Current Generation was released in 2024 featuring updates such as a fully digital instrument cluster, Slip-and-Assist Clutch, Bluetooth connectivity with Turn-by-Turn navigation and Full LED Lighting.

== Design ==
The NS200 is designed by prominent BMW Motorrad designer Edgar Heinrich while he's working for Bajaj Auto from 2009-2012. it is a street-fighter style motorcycle and well known for its wolf like look. It offers a digital instrument cluster and an upright seating position. It has a single-cylinder, four-stroke, triple spark-ignition & liquid-cooled engine. It uses exhaust, and rear nitrox-charged mono-shock suspension.

In 2024 Bajaj Updated the Pulsar NS Series (NS125, NS160, NS200). The updated NS now have a new LED headlight with DRLs and LCD digital instrument cluster. Bajaj Also launched the Pulsar NS400Z in India which uses 373cc l1 engine derived from Dominar 400.
