= Seyyed Javad Zabihi =

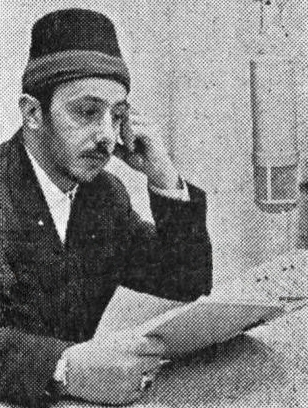
- Born: 1931; Shemiran
- Died: 15 July 1981 (aged 49–50); Tehran
- Cause of death: Murder
- Body discovered: Around Tehran
- Occupations: Singer, muezzin
- Musical career
- Genres: Persian traditional music
- Years active: 1957–1978

Seyyed Javad Zabihi (Persian: سید جواد ذبیحی; 1931 – July 15, 1980) was an muezzin, eulogist, and reciter of Noha and supplications in Shia religious ceremonies, as well as a performer of classical Persian singing.

Following the 1979 Revolution, Zabihi was arrested due to his association with the previous regime under Mohammad Reza Pahlavi. He was later released on the orders of Ruhollah Khomeini, but in July 1980, he was murdered by unknown individuals. His body was initially discovered by the gendarmerie and kept anonymously in a morgue.

== Early life ==
Seyyed Javad Zabihi was born in 1931 in Shemiran, Tehran. His father, Seyyed Esmaeil Zabihi, was a eulogist from the village of Darakeh, north of Tehran. From a young age, Zabihi wore a fez and participated in religious gatherings across Tehran and other cities. Though he lacked formal education, he was well-versed in Persian vocal radifs.

In 1957, he collaborated with Davoud Pirnia and artists such as Hassan Kassai, Reza Varzandeh, Jalil Shahnaz, Ahmad Ebadi, Morteza Mahjoubi, Ali Tajvidi, Parviz Yahaghi, Hossein Tehrani, Mehdi Khaledi, and Farhang Sharif, entering the field of secular music. Unlike most singers, he did not perform alongside musical instruments; instead, musicians would play instrumental improvisations before and after his a cappella singing. In 1968, he published a book of selected supplications titled Heavenly Melodies, based on his recitations for Radio Iran. He insisted on reciting supplications in Persian.

Zabihi was known for his clear, resonant voice, powerful vocal range, and mastery of Persian classical singing.

He was a religious singer who performed at official and religious ceremonies attended by the Shah. His supplications, including Rabbana and the adhan, were broadcast on Iranian radio and television before the revolution. Other works include eulogies for Ali and the Dua al-Sahar.

== Imprisonment and assassination ==
Due to his association with the Ministry of the Royal Court, Zabihi was targeted after the 1979 Iranian Revolution. Many pre-revolution cultural artifacts, including recordings of his work, were banned or destroyed by revolutionaries. This included the widespread call to prayer by Rahim Moazzenzadeh Ardabili, which was banned for years due to alleged "monarchical influences." Revolutionary forces with access to the national radio archives reportedly destroyed unique recordings of Zabihi's voice.

Zabihi was briefly imprisoned after the revolution but was released. Shortly after, on the evening of July 15, 1980, newspapers received a photograph of his gruesome murder, showing his mutilated body. According to Ettela’at newspaper, a group called "Shahin-e Enqelab-e Islami" claimed responsibility, citing his religious singing on state radio under the former regime as justification. Later, Sadegh Khalkhali included Zabihi in a list of individuals he sentenced to execution in his 2000 memoir.

Mohammad-Ali Abtahi wrote in an oral history of Iranian radio that Zabihi and his brother were religious broadcasters in Tehran and Mashhad, reciting dawn prayers and supplications. While their performances were religious, they occasionally included blessings for the Shah. Following the revolution, Zabihi was abducted by revolutionary forces and executed in the deserts around Tehran.

Conversely, Mohammad Motamedi wrote that his killers were not formally affiliated with revolutionary courts but were rogue extremists. Some of Zabihi's acquaintances claimed that while he was briefly imprisoned in 1979, the prison warden suggested he stay longer for his safety, but Zabihi declined and was later killed.

== See also ==
- Religious music in Iran
- Rahim Moazenzadeh Ardabili
- Salim Moazenzadeh Ardabili
