= Vyatka =

Vyatka may refer to:

- Vyatka Land
- Vyatka, former name of the city of Kirov, Kirov Oblast, Russia
- Vyatka (river), a river in Russia
- Vyatka Region, an informal name of Kirov Oblast of Russia
- Vyatka (motor scooter), a Russian copy of Italy's Vespa Motor Scooter
- Vyatka horse, a sturdy breed of workhorse from the Vyatka Region
