= Tula T-200 =

Soviet scooter

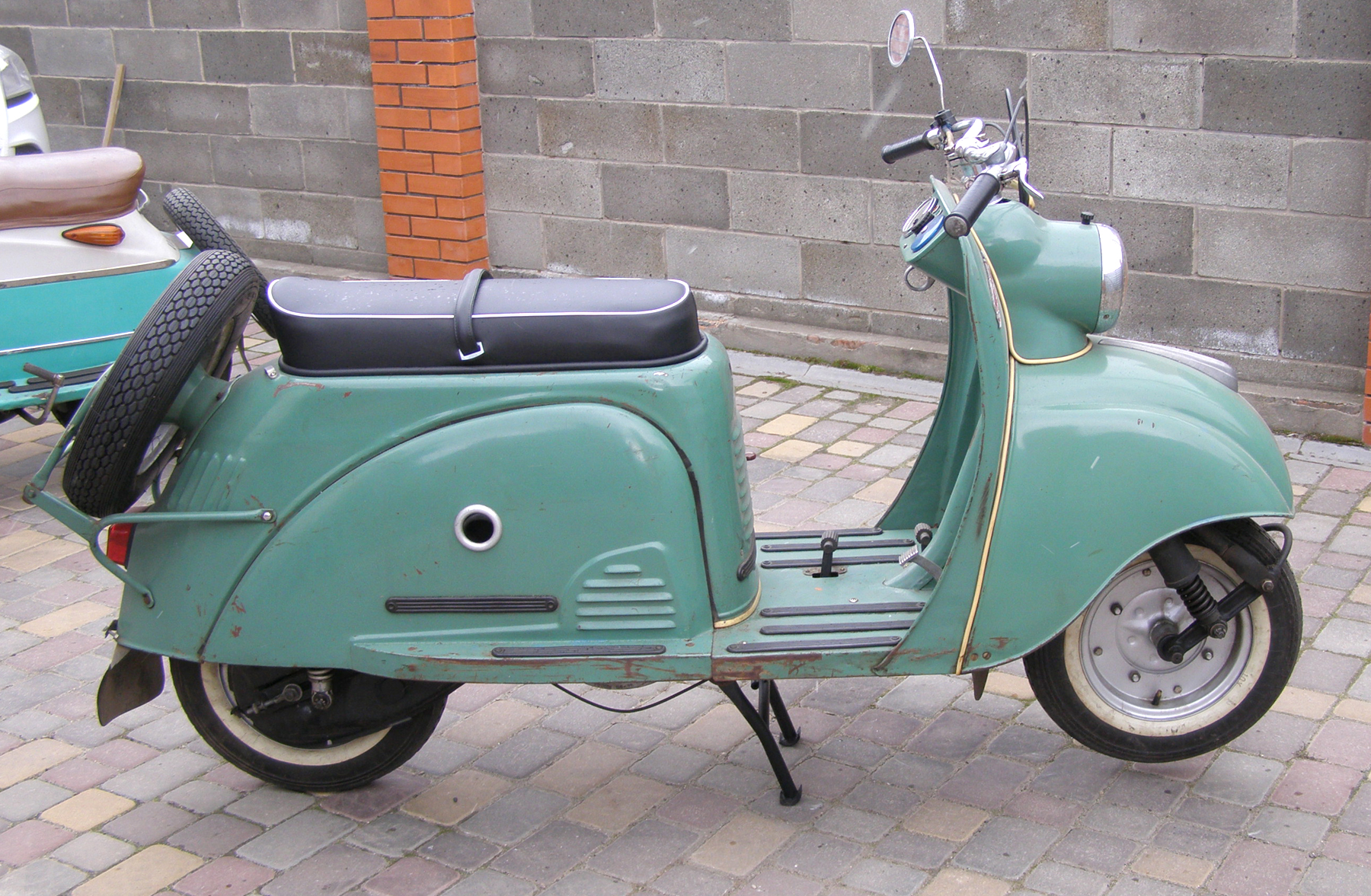
- T-200M
- Manufacturer: TMZ
- Production: 1957–1968
- Assembly: Tula, Soviet Union
- Successor: TMZ Turist
- Engine: single-cylinder two-stroke air-cooled cylinder diameter × piston stroke 62 × 66 mm
- Compression ratio: 6.6:1
- Top speed: 80 kilometres per hour (50 mph)
- Power: 8 HP at 4,900 rpm
- Transmission: 4-speed
- Wheelbase: 1,380 millimetres (54 in)
- Dimensions: L: 1,930 millimetres (76 in); W: 515 millimetres (20.3 in); H: 1,100 millimetres (43 in)
- Weight: 155 kilograms (342 lb) (wet)
- Fuel capacity: 11.5 litres (3.0 US gal)

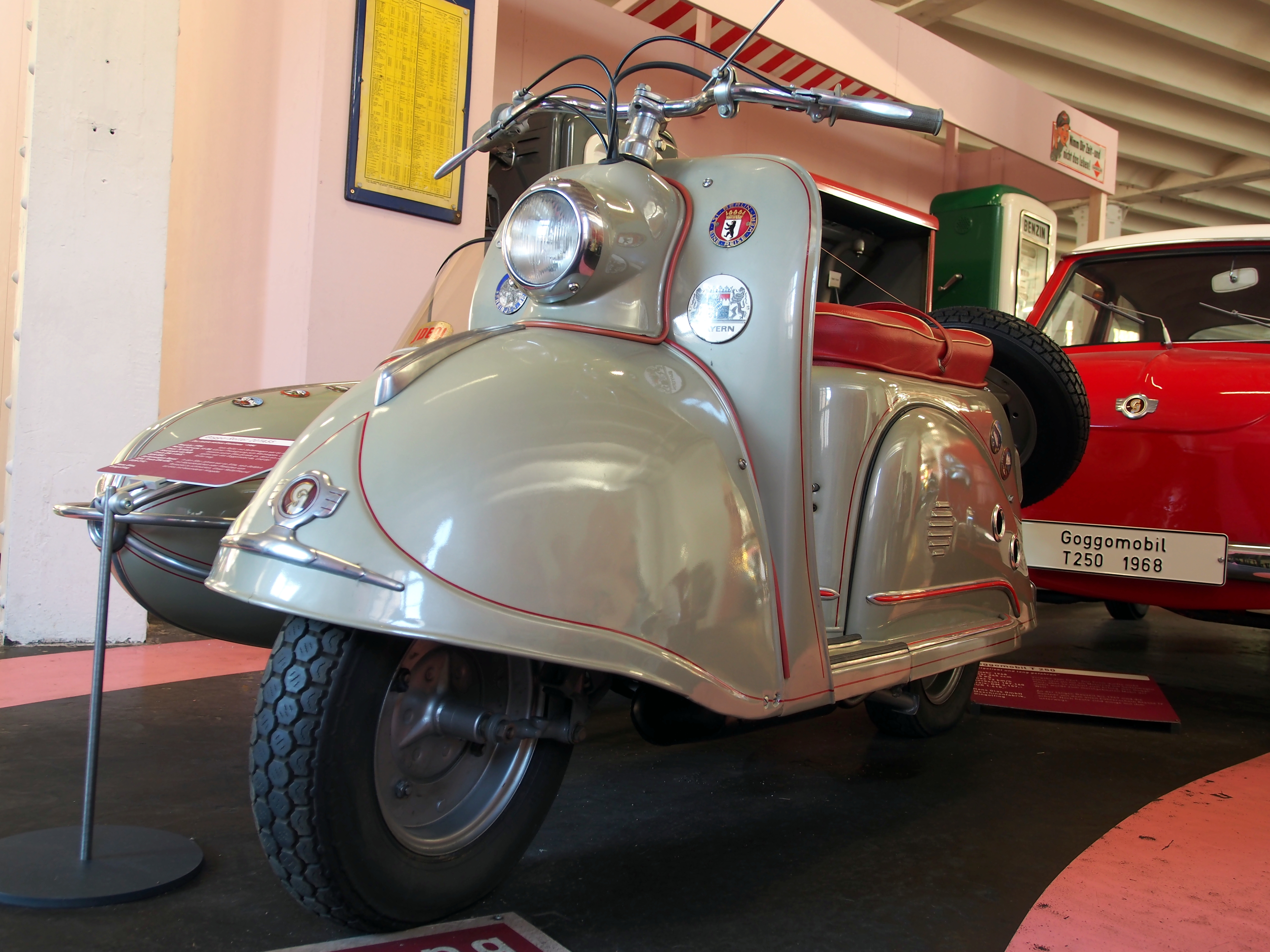
Original model – Goggo 200 (later version with cutaway fender)

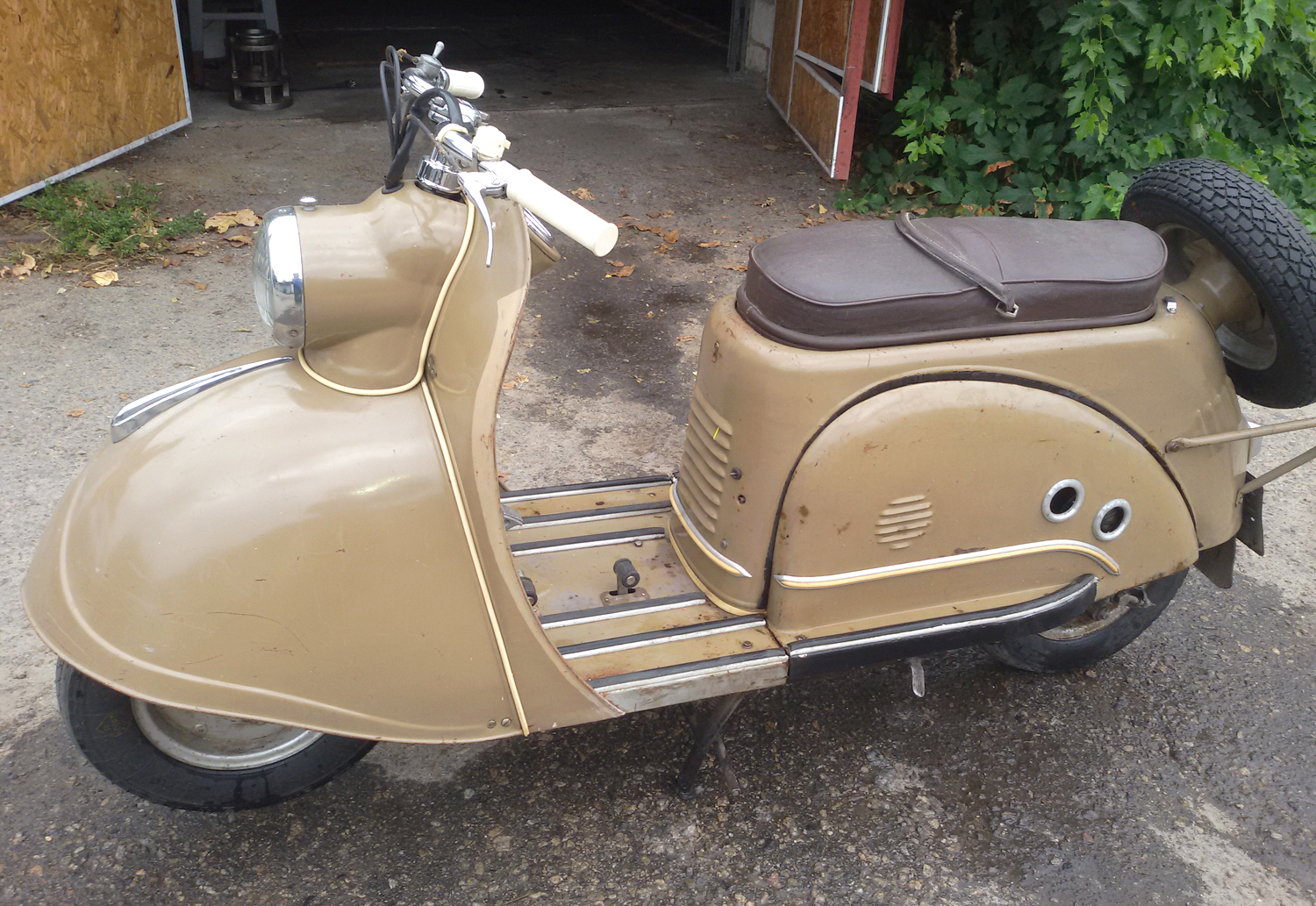
Tula T-200 of the first model

Tula T-200 was a Soviet 200 cm^{3} class scooter, manufactured by TMZ in Tula from 1957 to 1968 (from 1961 in the T-200M version). It was a copy of the West German Glas Goggo 200. One of the first scooters produced in the Soviet Union.

== History ==
In the 1950s, scooters began gaining popularity in Western countries, but they were not yet produced in the centrally planned economy of the Soviet Union. On 19 June 1956, the Council of Ministers of the Soviet Union decided to start domestic production of their own scooters (Russian: мотороллер, romanized: motoroller). Due to the lack of time and prior experience in scooter design, it was decided to copy the best Western models without a license, and work in this direction had already begun in 1955. One of the plants designated to produce scooters was the Tula Machine-Building Plant (Tulskij Maszynostroitielnyj Zawod, TMZ) in Tula, which previously had not manufactured vehicles but was engaged in armament and machinery production. After testing various models at the Central Experimental Design Bureau for the motorcycle industry in Serpukhov, the West German Glas Goggo 200 was selected as the model for production in Tula. At the same time, the Vyatskiye Polyany Machine-Building Plant began producing the lighter Vyatka VP-150 scooter, copied from the Italian Vespa.

The documentation for the heavier scooter, named Tula T-200, was developed in cooperation with the Central Experimental Design Bureau in Serpukhov, which copied the powertrain, including the engine and electrical system. Some changes were made to the original design, such as using a Soviet carburetor, with minimal differences in engine parameters. (Note: In the case of Tula, the displacement is stated as 199 cm³ and the power as 8 HP, compared to 197 cm³ and 9.5 HP in Goggo.) The copied scooter was significantly heavier (over 150 kg compared to the original's 125 kg), so larger 10-inch tires were used instead of the 8-inch ones found on the basic Goggo model. (Note: The basic Goggo 200 models had 4.00–8 wheels, but the Deluxe version had 4.00–10 wheels.) Early Goggo scooters had a distinctive fixed fender covering the entire front wheel, but the Tula received a fender with a shallow cutout at the bottom, similar to later models. Despite these changes, the Soviet scooter did not become direct competition because in 1956, Glas ceased scooter production to focus on microcars. (Note: A total of 46,666 Goggo units were produced, including some with 125 cm³ and 150 cm³ engines and 485 three-wheeled delivery versions.)

In January 1957, five prototype T-200 scooters were built, and mass production began on 27 April 1957. By the end of the year, only 992 units were produced, but in the following year, production reached 14,315 units. A novelty among Soviet motorcycles was the electric starter. However, in 1960, a kickstarter was introduced, which was more practical in remote rural areas in case the battery was discharged. From 1961, (Note: The 200M was produced from 1961 according to Woroncow) an improved version, the T-200M, was produced. This version increased the power by 1 HP, reduced the weight by 10 kg (partly by eliminating the electric starter), and changed the front suspension to improve handling; visually, it had a deeper cutout in the fender.

In 1962, a series of T-200K scooters with a sidecar was produced, with the sidecar body taken from the IZH-56 motorcycle (according to some publications, 94 units were built). In total, over 280,000 T-200 and 200M scooters were produced over 12 years. The concept of a scooter with a sidecar, a rare design, was initially implemented in the Goggo as well.

== Construction ==
The body was made up of a frame with attached stamped metal panels, providing structural rigidity. The body housed the battery, carburetor, muffler, and air filter, and in the upper part, under the two-seater seat, the fuel tank was located. The brake and gear change pedals were placed on the flat floor. The wide front fender was stationary, as was the headlight in the housing above it and the instrument panel on the inner side of the cover. On the right front cover, there was a stylized inscription m200 or m200м.

The engine had a capacity of 199 cm^{3}, a single-cylinder two-stroke, with a cylinder diameter of 62 mm and a piston stroke of 66 mm, cooled by forced air cooling. The engine was integrated with a four-speed mechanical gearbox, mounted in the body in front of the rear wheel in the classic position – with the cylinder standing upright. The carburetor was of the K-28G type. The clutch was multi-plate, wet.

The wheels, measuring from 4.00 to 10 inches, were interchangeable, and a spare wheel was mounted at the rear of the body. The front wheel suspension in the T-200 was a double-sided trailing arm in the shape of a U (encompassing the wheel from the rear), suspended in the middle on a fork, sprung by two coil springs working in tension and equipped with a hydraulic shock absorber on the right side. The rear wheel suspension was on double-sided trailing arms, with coil springs working in compression and two shock absorbers. The role of the trailing arm on the right side was performed by the sealed drive chain cover. In the T-200M, the front suspension was changed to a double-sided leading arm, encompassing the wheel from the front, with two oil-spring telescopic shock absorbers, which were also used at the rear.

The electric starter in the T-200 also functioned as a generator (dynamostarter). The T-200 had a 12-volt electrical system and a 20 Ah battery. From 1960, a kick starter was also used, and in the T-200M, the electric starter and battery were eliminated, introducing an alternating current system.

== Derivative versions and further development ==
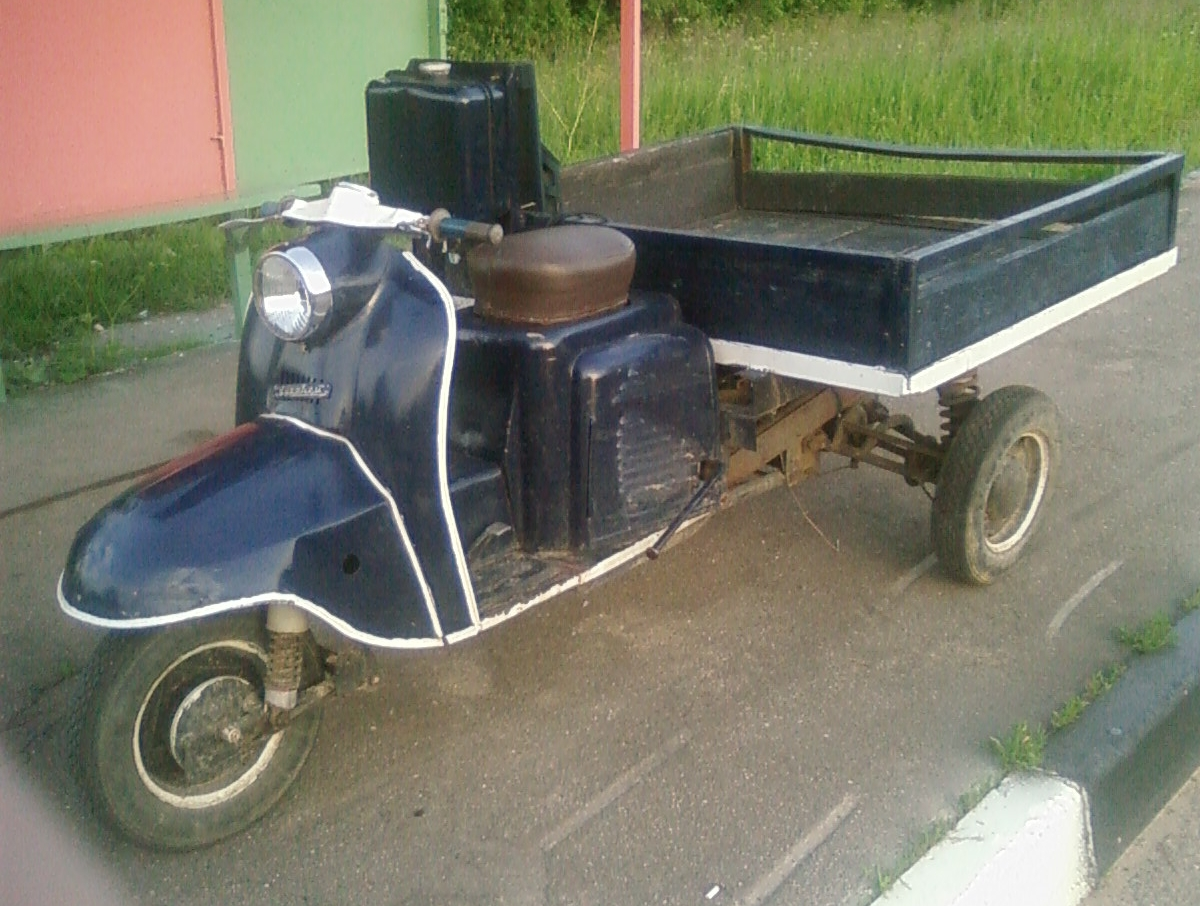
TGA-200 Murawiej

Based on the T-200, the three-wheeled cargo vehicle TG-200 was developed early on, with the first 99 units produced in the same year, 1957. It was also modeled on a corresponding German design. The letter G stood for gruzovoy (cargo), and they were initially produced in two variants: TG-200K with a cargo box and TG-200F – a panel van. In 1962, an insulated van for transporting food appeared. These vehicles were also exported, including to Yugoslavia and Germany. Cargo three-wheelers became an important product for the factories – 188,000 were produced over 12 years, with annual production reaching 27,000. Starting in 1969, they were replaced by the improved model TGA-200 Murawiej (ant in English), and later by Murawiej-2, based on further TMZ scooters. In total, the production of cargo three-wheelers derived from the T-200 and powered by the same or improved engine continued until 2001, reaching over 1.4 million units.

In 1960, 50 T-200T auto rickshaws were also produced for transporting visitors at the Exhibition of Achievements of National Economy – the front wheel was replaced by two wheels with a two-person transverse bench.

In 1968, the T-200M was replaced by its development, the TMZ Turist, and later by the TMZ Tulica.

== Bibliography ==
- Woroncow, A. (2003). Encykłopiedija motocykłow. Firmy, modieli, konstrukcyji (in Russian). Moscow: Za rulom. ISBN 5-85907-340-2.
