= Religious music in Iran =

Religious music in Iran is rich in melodies and genres. Iran is a multi cultural land, where various faiths exist. Each faith has its own associated music and ritual. Iranian religious music is defined as the music that has been used in streets, mosques, holy places and on religious occasions.

- Zoroastrian religious music in Iran
- Islamic religious music in Iran
  - Noheh and Rowzeh-khani
  - Sham e Ghariban
  - Prayer music
  - Iranian Azan

The most well-known Iranian performance of Azan dates back to 1955 performed by renowned Iranian religious singer, Rahim Moazenzadeh.

- Christian religious music in Iran
- Jewish religious music in Iran
- Baháʼí religious music in Iran

== See also ==
- Music of Iran
- Islamic music
- Salim Moazenzadeh Ardabili
