= Schulklopfer =

Jewish notable who gathers community members to form a minyan

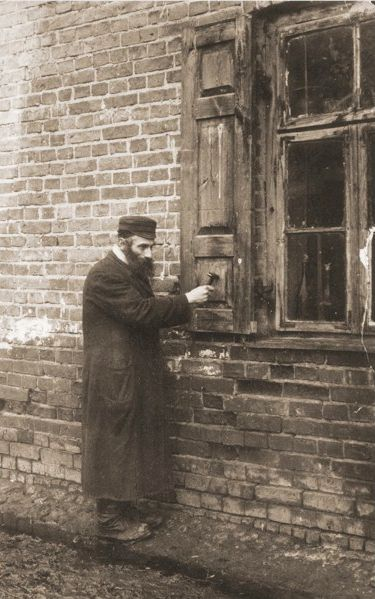

A schulklopfer (or shulklopfer; from Yiddish 'synagogue knocker') is the person who calls a Jewish community to prayer in the local synagogue.

The schulklopfer was usually a beadle, who would perform the task by wandering around the community, knocking on each household's door early in the morning. In Neustadt, he would knock four times. Israel Isserlein, a rabbi from Neustadt, argued that this pattern encoded the biblical phrase "I shall come to thee and bless thee" In the Rhine, the custom was to strike thrice.

In medieval Eastern Europe, the schulklopfer also had the role of individually inviting people to marriage ceremonies (nissuin); the invitations were made to the entire community by the schulklopfer on the morning of the marriage ceremony itself (such ceremonies were usually an evening affair).

The name stems from the Holy Roman Empire (Germany) in the Middle Ages. Christians in nearby communities sometimes referred to schulklopfers as campanatores (a Latin term meaning bell-strikers) or as Glöckner (German for bell-striker).

== See also ==
- Muezzin, the Islamic equivalent
- Klopfer, surname
