= Klepper =

Origin
- Language: German
- Meaning: Gossip
- Region of origin: Germany

Other names
- Variant forms: Klopfer, Kloepfer, Klepfer

Klepper is a surname of German origin, which derives from the Middle High German word kleppern, meaning "to gossip". Alternative spellings include Klepfer, Kloepfer, and Klopfer. The name may refer to:

- Christian Kloepfer (1847–1913), Canadian politician
- Ed Klepfer (1888–1950), American baseball player
- Frank B. Klepper (1864–1933), American politician
- Jeff Klepper (born 1953), American musician
- Jochen Klepper (1903–1942), German writer
- John Klepper (1906–1997), American politician
- Jordan Klepper (born 1979), American comedian
- Leon Klepper (1900–1991), Romanian composer
- Steven Klepper (1949–1997), American economist

== See also ==
- 7130 Klepper, a main-belt asteroid
- Klepper canoe
- Klepper (TV series)
