= Ali Ahmed Mullah =

Muezzin of Masjid al-Haram

Sheikh Ali Ahmed Mullah
- علي أحمد ملا
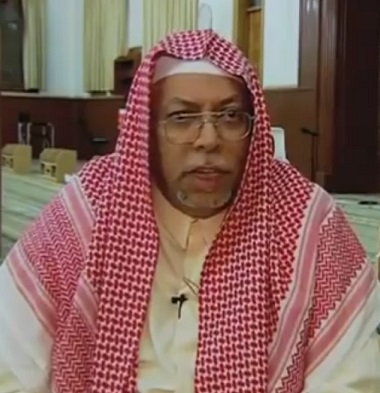

Chief Muezzin of Masjid al-Haram
- Preceded by: Farooq Hadrawi

Personal life
- Born: Ali Ahmed Mullah; 5 July 1947 (age 78) Mecca, Saudi Arabia
- Known for: Longest serving muezzin of the Masjid al-Haram to date.

Religious life
- Religion: Islam
- Denomination: Sunni

Ali Ahmed Mullah (born 5 July 1947) is a veteran muazzin (caller for prayer) at the Masjid al-Haram in Mecca, Saudi Arabia. He has served in this role for over four decades, making him the longest-serving muazzin at Islam's holiest mosque. Mullah has continued a family tradition in the profession since 1975.

He is widely respected throughout the Muslim world, and recordings of his adhan (call to prayer) are widely distributed and appreciated. Outside his role at the mosque, Mullah has stated he is also involved in his self-owned business. He has reportedly married four times, and has many children. His son, Atef bin Ali Ahmed Mullah, is now carrying on his legacy and he made his debut as a muazzin at the Masjid al-Haram on 4 April 2022.

== Career ==
Ali Ahmed Mullah began performing the adhan at the Masjid al-Haram at the age of 14, stepping in during the absence of his relatives – Abdul Hafeez Khoja (maternal uncle), Abdul Rahman Mullah (paternal uncle), and Ahmed Mullah (grandfather) – all of whom were muezzins at the mosque. His early calls to prayer were delivered before the introduction of loudspeakers, during a time when muezzins would ascend each of the mosque's seven minarets, such as the Bab al-Umrah, Bab al-Ziyara, and Bab al-Hekma Minarets, to issue the call. The chief muezzin, stationed at the al-Shafi'i Maqam near the Zamzam Well, would initiate the adhan, and each muezzin would repeat his words in succession until the call was complete. This method, rooted in Ottoman tradition, is still practiced in Turkey today.

After graduating from the Institute of Technical Education in Riyadh in 1970, Mullah worked as a teacher at Abdullah ibn al-Zubair Intermediate School. He was officially appointed as a muezzin at the Masjid al-Haram in 1984. On one occasion, he was also given the honour of performing the adhan at Al-Masjid an-Nabawi in Medina. Mullah has described performing the adhan at the Masjid al-Haram, the holiest mosque in Islam, as one of the greatest honours of his life.

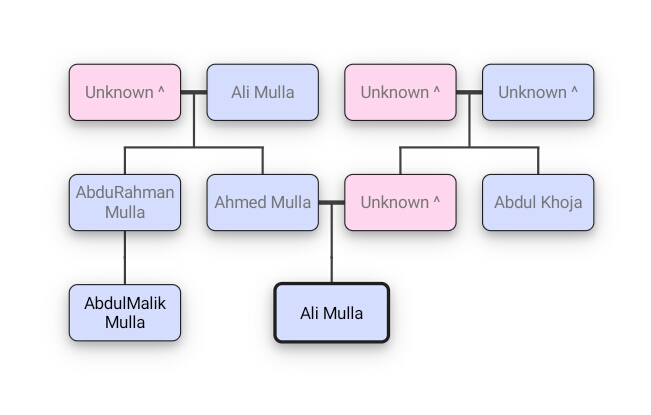
Muezzins in Mullah's lineage. Additionally, Sadiq Mullah (his uncle), Abdul Latif Mullah (his cousin) and Atef Mullah (his son) are not shown but were also muezzins.

== See also ==
- Farooq Hadrawi
- Masjid al-Haram
- Al-Masjid al-Nabawi
