= Vyatka horse =

Horse breed of Russia

Vyatka
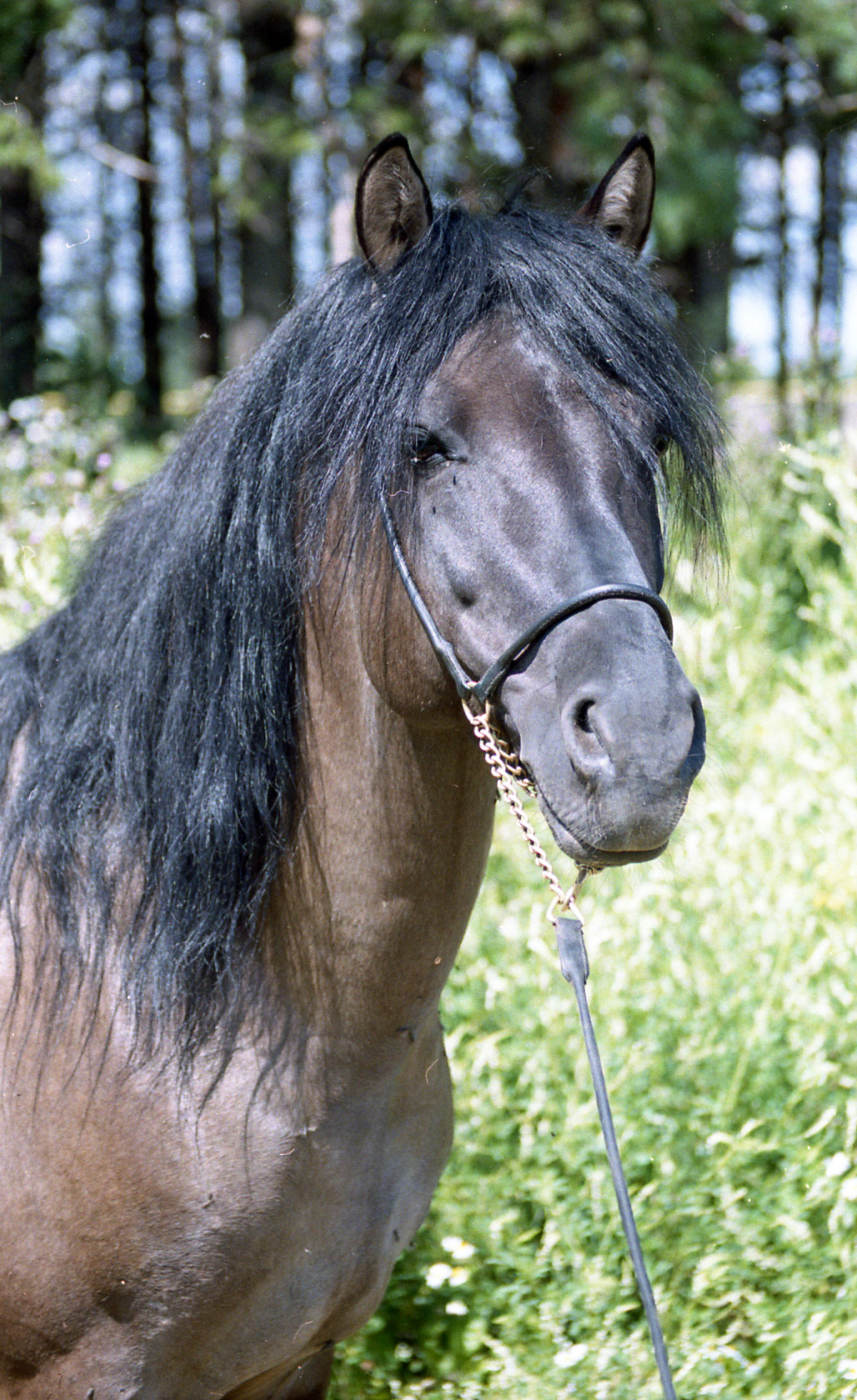
- Vyatka stallion
- Other names: Russian: Вятская лошадь; Russian: vyatskaya loshad; Vyatskaya; Viatka
- Country of origin: Russia

Traits
- Distinguishing features: Female height: 140 cm Female weight: 400 kg

Notes
- Conservation status: FAO (2007): endangered

The Vyatka or Viatka (Russian: Вятская лошадь, romanized: Vyatskaya loshad) is an endangered breed of horse native to Kirov Oblast and Udmurtia in Russia. It is named for the Vyatka River.

== History ==
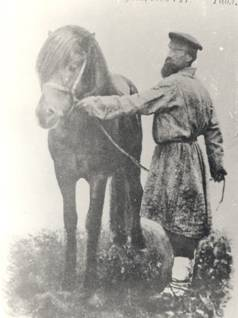
Vyatka stallion in 1902

The Vyatka was influenced by the climate and terrain of the Kirov, Udmurtia and western Perm regions; Estonian horses and Kleppers brought to northern Russia in the fourteenth century by Novgorod colonists may have affected its conformation, as may later imports of Estonian horses for mining work in the Ural Mountains. The Vyatka was valued for its endurance, speed and frugality. By the middle of the nineteenth century, it was considered the best horse for pulling troikas; some were exported from the Vyatka region, including to Poland.

In 1917 the breed was virtually extinct; some efforts at re-establishment were made after the Russian Revolution. Numbers in the Kirov and Udmurtia were estimated at 2000 in 1980. In 2003 the known population numbered 560, and in 2007 the Vyatka was on the Endangered List of the FAO.

== Characteristics ==
The average height at the withers of Vyatka mares is 140 centimetres (13.3 hands; 55 inches), and the average weight 400 kilograms (880 lb). The usual coat color was originally a striped dun with primitive markings – zebra stripes and a dorsal stripe; it has become more variable, and may also be roan, bay, brown or chestnut, or occasionally black.
