= Vyatskiye Polyany Machine-Building Plant =

Manufacturer in Vyatskiye Polyany, Kirov Oblast, Russia

- Company type: Open joint-stock company (JSC)
- Industry: Firearms
- Founded: 26 April 1940; 86 years ago
- Headquarters: Vyatskiye Polyany, Russia
- Products: Rifles, shotguns and machine guns
- Revenue: $1.36 million (2017)
- Operating income: $20,534 (2017)
- Net income: $138,852 (2017)
- Total assets: $23.4 million (2017)
- Total equity: −$13.6 million (2017)
- Parent: Rostec
- Website: molot-guns.ru

Vyatskiye Polyany Molot Machine-Building Plant (Russian: Вятско-Полянский машиностроительный завод) is a Russian company based in Vyatskiye Polyany. The plant manufactures rifles and shotguns under the Molot-Oruzhiye (Hammer Weapon) and VEPR (Wild Boar) brands, and is a subsidiary of Rostec. It is one of the largest companies in Kirov Oblast.

== History ==
Molot was established in 1940, and was originally based in Zagorsk, Moscow Oblast. It was the main manufacturer of the PPSh-41 submachine gun. In 1941 the plant was evacuated to Vyatskiye Polyany with its workers, including G. S. Shpagin and N. F. Makarov, designer of the eponymous Makarov pistol. In the 1950s the plant manufactured the Vyatka motor scooter.

In the 1990s the company diversified by launching a line of sports and hunting weapons. Rifles manufactured in the Molot plant are exported to the United States under the VEPR brand.

The company entered bankruptcy proceedings in 2012; as of 2017 it is being controlled by a bankruptcy managing company.

== Products ==
=== Military weapon ===
- Anti-tank guided missile of 9K115-2 Metis-M
- Rocket-propelled grenade RPG-29 (GRAU index — 6G20)
- Kalashnikov's hand-held machine gun 7.62×39mm (GRAU index — 6P2)
- Kalashnikov's hand-held machine gun RPK-74 5.45×39mm (GRAU index — 6P18)
- Kalashnikov's hand-held machine gun modernized RPK-74М 5.45×39mm (GRAU index — 6P39)
- Kalashnikov's hand-held machine gun with a folding butt RPK-201 5.56×45mm NATO (GRAU index — 6P55)
- Kalashnikov's hand-held machine gun RPK-203 7.62×39mm (GRAU index — 6P8М)
- 30mm automatic grenade launcher AGS-17 Plamya 30×29mm (GRAU index — 6G11, index of a grenade launcher with a machine — 6G10)
- 30mm automatic aircraft grenade launcher AG-17A 30×29mm (GRAU index — 9-A-800)
- 30mm automatic grenade launcher AG-17M 30×29mm (GRAU index — 6G11M)
- 30mm automatic grenade launcher with remote control AG-17D 30×29mm (GRAU index — 6G42)

=== Civilian sports and hunting weapons ===
- Vepr-12 semi-automatic 12-gauge shotgun
- VPO-165 5.56x45 AKSU-based semi-automatic carbine
- VPO-123 semi-automatic 7.62х54mmR rifle
- VPO-128 semi-automatic 6.5mm Grendel rifle
