= Klopfer =

Klopfer is a German occupational surname, derived from the Middle High German klopfen, meaning "to pound, bang, or hammer", and thus indicating a person in the clothing trade, mining or metal working. Notable people with the surname include:

- Bruno Klopfer (1900–1971), German psychologist
- Donald S. Klopfer (1902–1986), American businessman
- Eric Klopfer (born 1970), American educator
- Eugen Klöpfer (1886–1950), German actor
- George Klopfer (1940–2019), American physician
- Gerhard Klopfer (1905–1987), German Nazi official
- Goetz Klopfer (born 1942), American race walker
- Heini Klopfer (1918–1968), German architect
- Klopfer (writer) (born 1980), pseudonym of German writer Christian Schmidt
- Peter Klopfer (born 1930), German-born American zoologist, civil rights advocate and educator
- Regina Klopfer (1903–1991), Hungarian singer
- Sonya Klopfer (1934–2025), American figure skater
- Wilhelm Klopfer (born 1901), Swiss rower

== See also ==
- Klöpfer, another name for the Swiss wine grape Räuschling
- Schulklopfer, defunct Jewish communal role
