= Adhan =

Islamic call to prayer

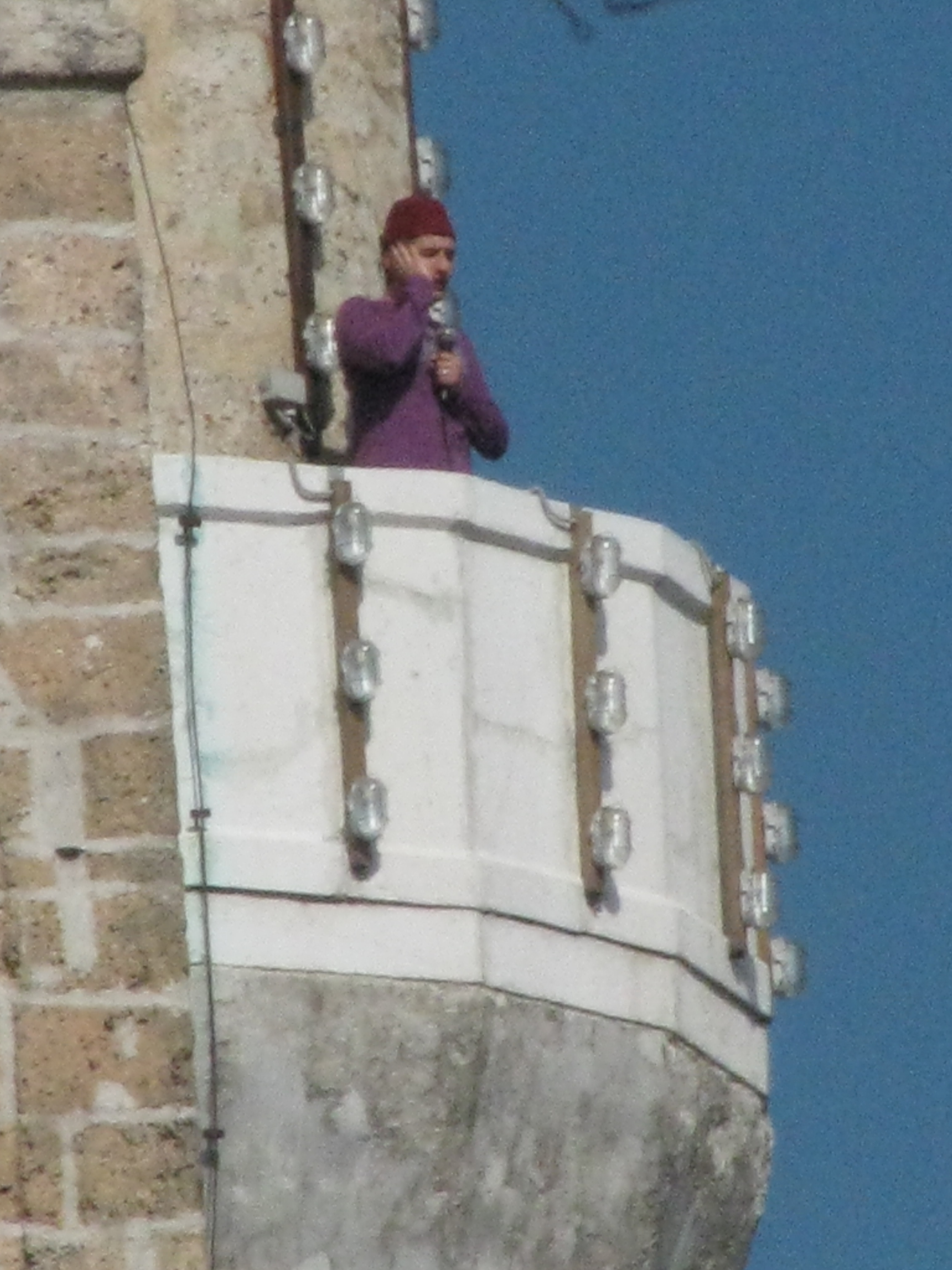
- Muezzin reciting the adhan at the Gazi Husrev-beg Mosque in Sarajevo, Bosnia and Herzegovina
- Arabic: أَذَان
- Romanization: ʔaḏān
- Literal meaning: "to call"

The adhan (Note: Also variously transliterated as adhaan, athan, athaan, adhane (in French), ajan/ajaan, azan/azaan (in Azerbaijan, Iran and South Asia), adzan/adzaan (in Southeast Asia), and ezan/ezaan (in Turkey and the Balkans), among other languages.) (Arabic: أَذَان, romanized: Aḏān, IPA: [ʔaˈðaːn]) is the Islamic call to prayer, usually recited by a muezzin, traditionally from the minaret of a mosque, shortly before each of the five obligatory daily prayers.

Fajr adhan at the Malmö Mosque in Sweden, 2012

It is the first call summoning Muslims to enter the mosque for fard (obligatory) salawat (prayers); a second call, known as the iqama, summons those already in the mosque to assemble for prayer. Muslims are encouraged to stop their activities and respond to the adhan by performing prescribed prayers, demonstrating reverence for the call to prayer and commitment to their faith.

The five prayer times are known in Arabic as fajr (فجر), dhuhr (ظهر), asr (عصر), maghrib (مغرب), and isha (عشاء). In Turkey, they are called sabah, öğle, ikindi, akşam, and yatsı; the five calls to prayer are recited in different makams, corresponding to the time of day. On Fridays, the dhuhr (ظهر) is called jummah (جمعة) or Friday prayer. It is considered the most important prayer of Islam. In Turkey, jummah is called cuma namazı.

== Etymology ==
Adhān, Arabic for "announcement", from the root adhina, meaning: "to listen, to hear, be informed about", is variously transliterated in different cultures.

It is commonly written as athan, as well as adhane in French; azān in Iran and parts of South Asia (in Persian, Pashto, Balochi, Hindi, Bengali, Urdu, and Punjabi); adzan in Southeast Asia (Indonesian and Malaysian); and ezan in Turkish, Bosnian, and Serbo-Croatian Latin (езан in Serbo-Croatian Cyrillic and Bulgarian); and ezani in Albanian. Muslims in many parts of South Asia, including the Malabar Coast of India and the Punjab region of India and Pakistan, use the Persian term بانگ (bāng) for the call to public prayer. Another derivative of the word adhān is ʾudhun (أُذُن), meaning 'ear'.

== Announcer ==
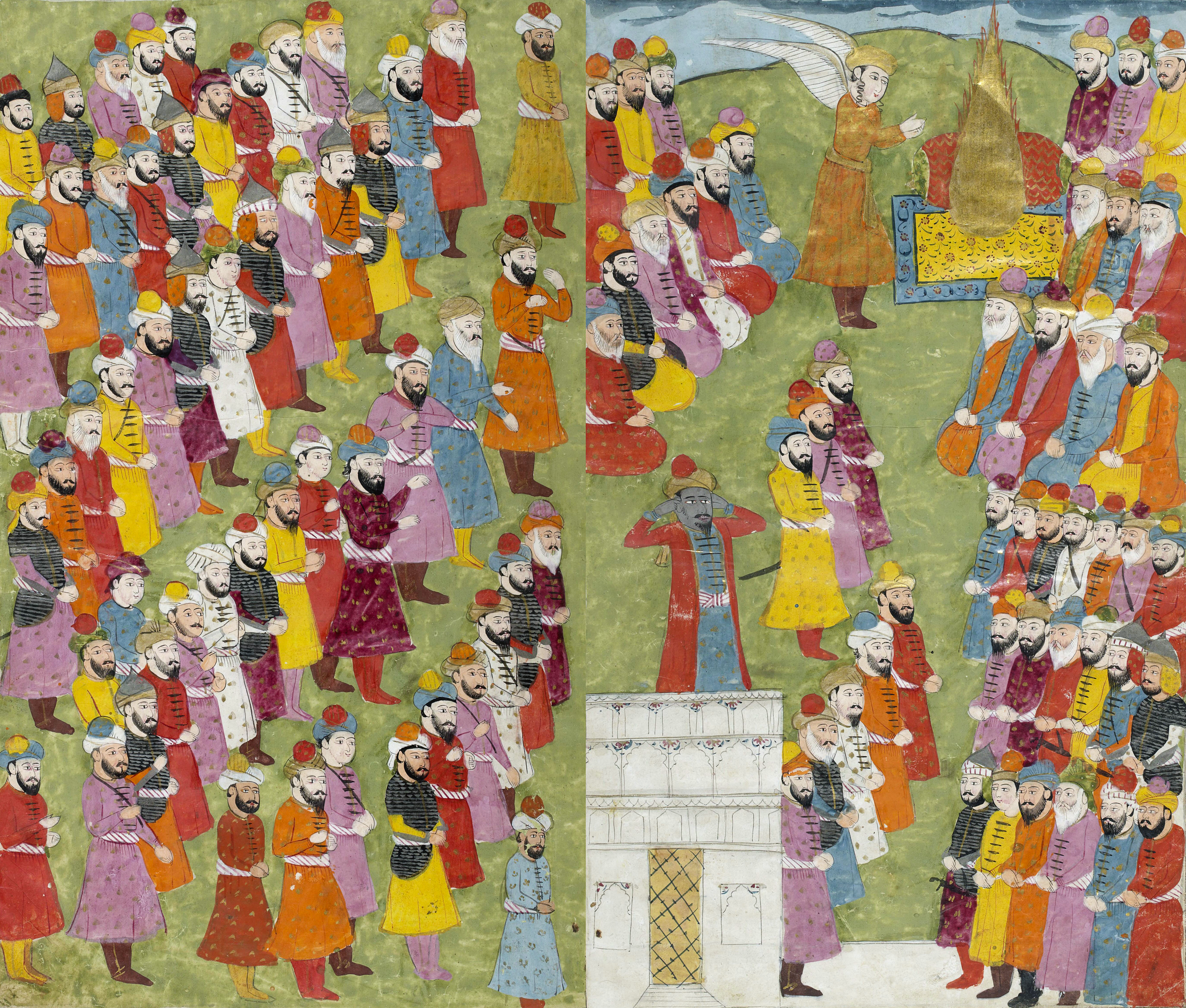
Islamic miniature depicting Jibril providing instructions on how to perform the call to prayer to Muhammad (golden flame) as well as Bilal ibn Rabah the first muezzin calling the Muslims to prayer from atop the Kaaba.

A muezzin (مُؤَذِّن, muʾaḏḏin) is a person designated by a congregation to recite the adhan from its mosque. Typically, the call is made using a microphone and a recitation that is subsequently broadcast to the speakers, usually mounted on the upper part of the mosque's minarets, thus calling those nearby to prayer. However, in many mosques, the message can also be recorded. As Islamic prayers are recited at least five times daily, the call to prayer must be recited at least five times daily, as well. Thus, the adhan would be made by replaying a previously recorded call to prayer without the presence of a muezzin.

This way, the mosque operator can edit or mix the message and adjust its volume, without having to hire a full-time muezzin, or in the event of a muezzin's absence. This is why, in many Muslim countries, the sound of the prayer call can be identical between one mosque and another, as well as between one Salah hour and another, as is the case at the London Central Mosque. In the event of religious holidays like Eid al-Fitr and Eid al-Adha—as in Indonesia, where the Six Kalmas ('phrases') have to be recited aloud all day long—mosque operators use this recording method to create a looping recital of the Kalmas. Where no adhan can be heard, it is recommended that religious Muslims recite it before they begin their prayers.

The muezzin is chosen for his ability in reciting the adhan clearly, melodically, and loudly enough for all people to hear. This is one of the important duties in the mosque, as his companions and community rely on him in his call for Muslims to come to pray in congregation. The congregation's imam leads its prayer five times daily. The first muezzin in Islam was Bilal ibn Rabah, a freed slave of Abyssinian heritage. According to the Mawsuʿah al-Fiqhiyah, the muezzin should have an elegant voice, as well, and should be wise about the times of prayer and Islam.

== Words ==
Details of what is recited and how many times
Recital								Arabic Quranic Arabic	Romanization	Translation
Sunni				Ibadi	Shia		Quranist	Arabic Quranic Arabic	Romanization	Translation
Maliki	Hanafi	Shafi'i	Hanbali	Ibadi	Imami	Zaydi	Quranist	Arabic Quranic Arabic	Romanization	Translation
2x	4x			2x	4x	2x		ٱللَّٰهُ أَكْبَرُ	allāhu akbar^{u}	God is greater
4x	2x							أَشْهَدُ أَن لَّا إِلَٰهَ إِلَّا ٱللَّٰهُ	ashhadu an lā ilāha illa llāh^{u}	I testify there are no gods except God
4x	2x						None	أَشْهَدُ أَنَّ مُحَمَّدًا رَسُولُ ٱللَّٰهِ	ashhadu anna muḥammadan rasūlu llāh^{i}	I testify Muhammad is the messenger of God
2x								حَيَّ عَلَى ٱلصَّلَاةِ	ḥayya ʿala ṣ-ṣalāh^{ti}	Come to prayer
2x								حَيَّ عَلَى ٱلْفَلَاحِ	ḥayya ʿala l-falāḥ^{i}	Come to success
None					2x		None	حَيَّ عَلَىٰ خَيْرِ ٱلْعَمَلِ	ḥayya ʿalā khayri l-ʿamal^{i}	Come to the best of deeds
2x (Dawn prayer only)				None				ٱلصَّلَاةُ خَيْرٌ مِنَ ٱلنَّوْمِ	aṣ-ṣalātu khayrun mina n-nawm^{i}	Prayer is better than sleep
2x								ٱللَّٰهُ أَكْبَرُ	allāhu akbar^{u}	God is greater
1x					2x	1x		لَا إِلَٰهَ إِلَّا ٱللَّٰهُ	lā ilāha illā llāh^{u}	There are no gods except God

Repeating the two testimonies of faith is recommended according to the Shafi'i school. The first time should be said in low voice to oneself, and the second should be called out; this was the practice of the people of Mecca. The Maliki school uses the same adhan, except allāhu akbar^{u} should only be said twice in the beginning; this was the practice of the people of Medina. Both positions also use a narration in Sahih Muslim as evidence.

On rare situations where there is a serious danger to people going outside to congregate in mosques like heavy weather, or pandemics such as during COVID-19, the muezzin may say "ṣallū fī buyūtikum" (ْصَلُّوا فِي بُيُوتِكُم, pray in your homes) or "ṣallū fī riḥālikum" (ْصَلُّوا فِي رِحَالِكُم, pray in your dwellings) after "ḥayya ʿala ṣ-ṣalāh" and "ḥayya ʿala l-falāḥ".

== Religious views ==
External videos
- Recitation of the Shia adhan

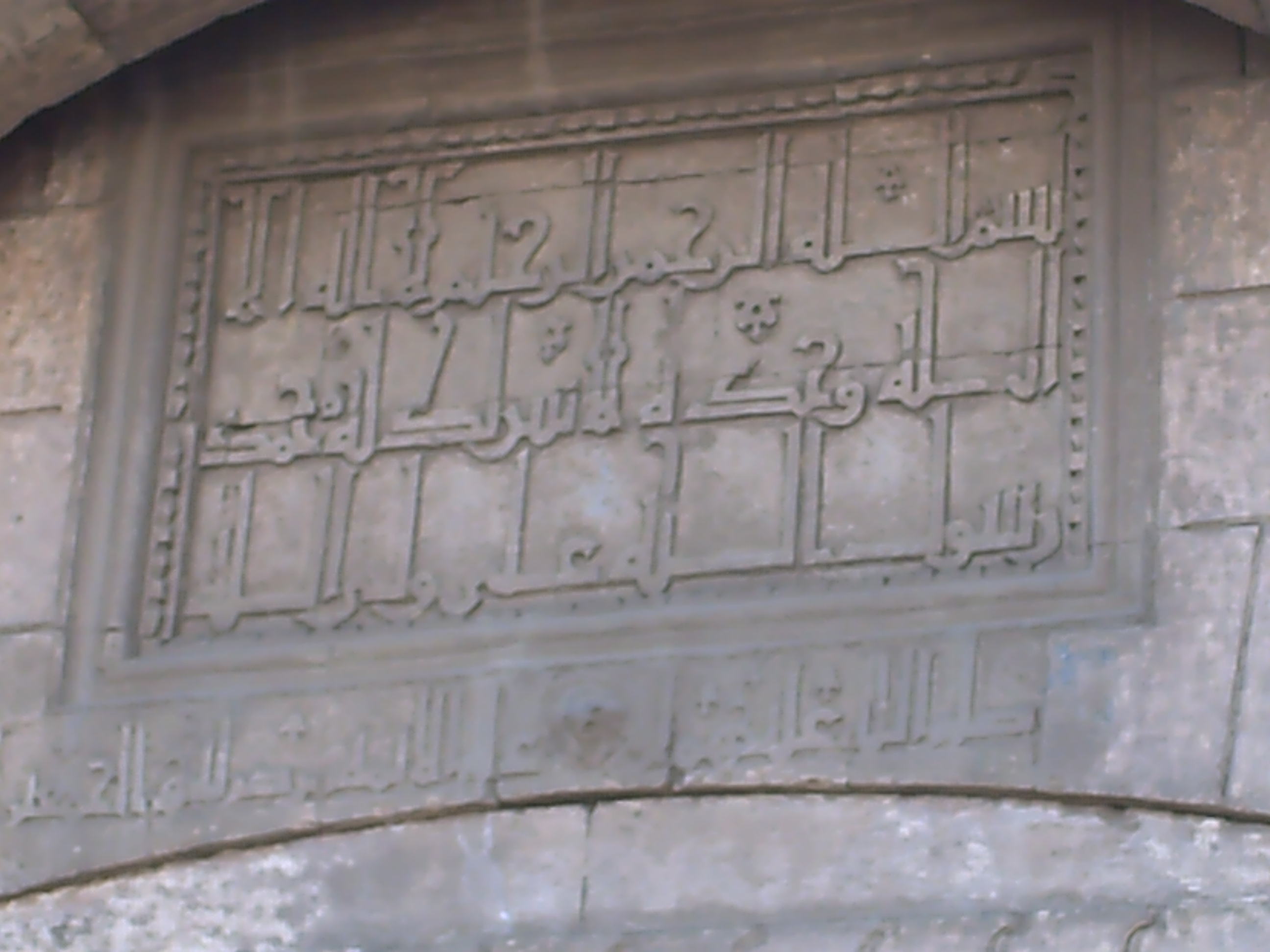
Photo of kalima at Bab al-Nasr of Shia Fatimid dynasty of Cairo with phrase: ʿalīyun walīyu -llāh

=== Shia ===
Shia sources state Muhammad, according to God's command, ordered the adhan as a means of calling Muslims to prayer. Shia Islam teaches that no one else contributed, or had any authority to contribute, towards the composition of the adhan.

Shia sources also narrate that Bilal ibn Rabah al-Habashi was, in fact, the first person to recite the adhan publicly out loud in front of the Muslim congregation.

The fundamental phrase lā ʾilāha ʾillā llāh is the foundation stone of Islam along with the belief in it. It declares that "there is no god but Allah". This is the confession of Tawhid or the "doctrine of Oneness [of God]".

The phrase Muḥammadun rasūlu -llāh fulfills the requirement that there should be someone to guide in the name of God, which states Muhammad is God's Messenger. This is the acceptance of prophethood or Nabuwat of Muhammad.

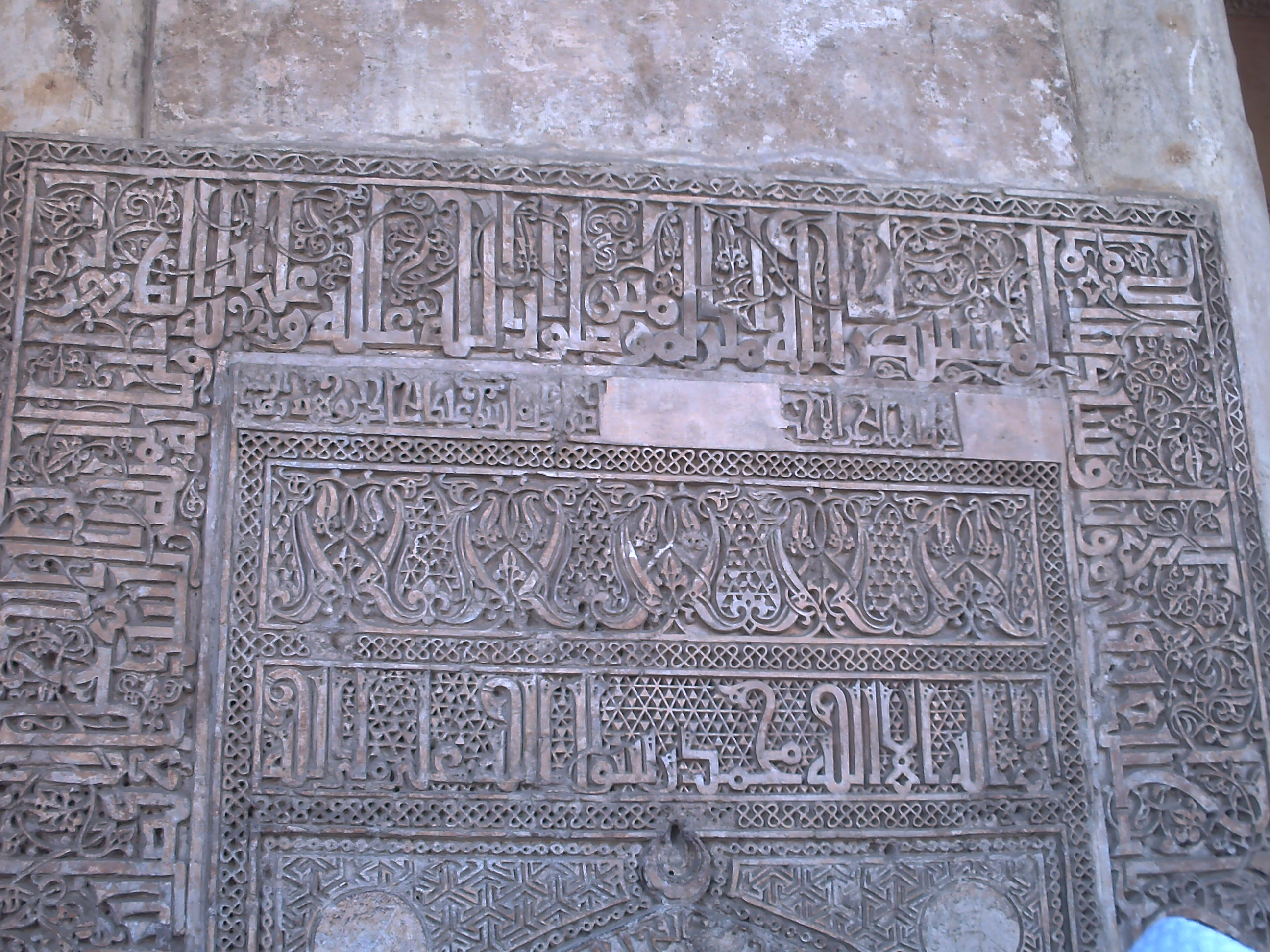
The qiblah of Mustansir of Shia Fatimid dynasty of, in Mosque of Ibn Tulun of Cairo showing Kalimat ash-shahādah with the phrase: ʿalīyun walīyu -llāh

According to the Shia belief, Muhammad declared Ali ibn Abi Talib as his successor, at Ghadir Khumm, which was required for the continuation of his guidance. According to the hadith of the pond of Khumm, Muhammad stated that: "Of whomsoever I am the authority, Ali is his authority". Hence, it is recommended to recite the phrase ʿalīyun walī -llāh ("Ali is His [God's] Authority").

The Twelver scholar al-Saduq wrote in Man La Yahduruhu al-Faqih that declarations affirming Ali's wilayah were not part of the original adhan. He accused the Mufawwida of fabricating reports introducing these additions.

In one of the Qiblah of Ma'ad al-Mustansir Billah (1035–1094) of Fatemi era masjid of Qahira (Mosque of Ibn Tulun) engraved his name and kalimat ash-shahādah as lā ʾilāha ʾillā -llāh, muḥammadun rasūlu -llāh, ʿalīyun walīyu -llāh (لَا إِلَٰهَ إِلَّا ٱللَّٰهُ مُحَمَّدٌ رَسُولُ ٱللَّٰهِ عَلِيٌّ وَلِيُّ ٱللَّٰهِ).

Adhan reminds Muslims of these three Islamic teaching Tawhid, Nabuwat and Imamate before each prayer. These three emphasise devotion to God, Muhammad and Imam, which are considered to be so linked together that they can not be viewed separately; one leads to other and finally to God.

The phrase is optional to some Shia as justified above. They feel that Ali's Walayah ("Divine Authority") is self-evident, a testification and need not be declared. However, the greatness of God is also taken to be self-evident, but Muslims still declare Allāhu ʾakbar to publicize their faith. This is the reason that the most Shia give for the recitation of the phrase regarding Ali.

Sunni Adhan
The call to prayer in Sunni Islam.

External videos
- Sunni adhan

=== Sunni ===
Sunnis believe that the adhan was not written or said by the Islamic prophet, Muhammad, but rather by one of his companions. Abdullah ibn Zayd, a companion of Muhammad, reportedly had a vision in his dream, in which the adhan was revealed to him by God. He related this to his companions; later, this news reached Muhammad, who confirmed it. Because of his stunning voice, Muhammad chose a freed Habeshan slave by the name of Bilal ibn Rabah al-Habashi to make the call for prayers. Muhammad preferred the call over the use of bells, used by Christians, and horns, used by Jews.

Sunni adhan in Matey Qoqanuly mosque, Kazakhstan

During the Friday prayer (Salat al-Jum'ah), there is one adhan but some Sunni Muslims increase it to two adhans; the first is to call the people to the mosque, the second is said before the imam begins the khutbah (sermon). Just before the prayers start, someone amongst the praying people recites the iqama as in all prayers. The basis for this is that at the time of the caliph Uthman he ordered two adhans to be made, the first of which was to be made in the marketplace to inform the people that the Friday prayer was soon to begin, and the second adhan would be the regular one held in the mosque. Not all Sunnis prefer two adhans as the need for warning the people of the impending time for prayer is no longer essential now that the times for prayers are well known.

== Supplication ==
=== Shia ===
While listening to the adhan, it is recommended to repeat the same words silently, except when the adhan reciter (muezzin) says: "أَشْهَدُ أَنْ لَا إِلَٰهَ إِلَّا ٱللَّٰهُ" and "أَشْهَدُ أَنَّ مُحَمَّدًا رَسُولُ ٱللَّٰهِ" (ʾašhadu ʾan lā ʾilāha ʾillā -llāh^{u} and ʾašhadu ʾanna Muḥammadan rasūlu -llāh^{i}) they silently say:

وَأَنَا أَشْهَدُ أَنْ لَا إِلَٰهَ إِلَّا ٱللَّٰهُ وَأَشْهَدُ أَنَّ مُحَمَّدًا رَسُولُ ٱللَّٰهِ (صَلَّى ٱللَّٰهُ عَلَيْهِ وَآلِهِ وَسَلَّمَ) أَكْتَفِي بِهَا عَمَّنْ أَبَىٰ وَجَحَدَ وَأُعِينُ بِهَا مَنْ أَقَرَّ وَشَهِدَ

wa-ʾanā ʾašhadu ʾan lā ʾilāha ʾillā -llāhu wa-ʾašhadu ʾanna muḥammadan rasūlu -llāhi (ṣallā -llāhu ʿalayhi wa-ʾālihi wa-sallama) ʾaktafī bihā ʿamman ʾabā wa-jaḥada wa-ʾuʿīnu bihā man ʾaqarra wa-šahid^{a}

"And I [also] bear witness that there is no deity but God, I bear witness that Muhammad is the Messenger of God, and I suffice by it (the testimonies) against whoever refuses and fights against it (the testimonies), and I designate by it one who agrees and testifies."

Whenever Muhammad's name is mentioned in the adhan or iqama, it is recommended to recite salawat, a form of the peace be upon him blessing specifically for Muhammad. This salawat is usually recited as either ṣallā -llāhu ʿalayhī wa-ʾālihī wa-sallam^{a} (صَلَّى ٱللَّٰهُ عَلَيْهِ وَآلِهِ وَسَلَّمَ), ṣallā -llāhu ʿalayhī wa-ʾālih^{ī} (صَلَّى ٱللَّٰهُ عَلَيْهِ وَآلِهِ), or ʾallāhumma ṣalli ʿalā muḥammadin wa-ʾāli muḥammad^{in} (ٱللَّٰهُمَّ صَلِّ عَلَىٰ مُحَمَّدٍ وَآلِ مُحَمَّدٍ).

Immediately following the adhan, it is recommended to sit and recite the following dua (supplication):

ٱللَّٰهُمَّ ٱجْعَلْ قَلْبِي بَارًّا وَرِزْقِي دَارًّا وَٱجْعَلْ لِي عِنْدَ قَبْرِ نَبِيِّكَ (صَلَّى ٱللَّٰهُ عَلَيْهِ وَآلِهِ وَسَلَّمَ) قَرَارًا وَمُسْتَقَرًّا

ʾallāhumma -jʿal qalbī bārran wa-rizqī dārran wa-jʿal lī ʿinda qabri nabīyika (ṣallā -llāhu ʿalayhi waʾ-ālihi wa-sallama) qarāran wa-mustaqarrā^{n}

"O God! Make my heart to be righteous, and my livelihood to be constant, and my sustenance to be continuous, and Make for me, in the presence of Your Prophet (God bless him and his progeny and grant him peace) a dwelling and a rest."

=== Sunni ===
While listening to the adhan, it is recommended to silently repeat after the caller, except when they say "come to prayer" (ḥayya ʿala ṣ-ṣalāh^{ti}) and "come to success" (ḥayya ʿala l-falāḥ^{i}), to which it is recommended to silently say "there is no ability and no power except by God, [the Most High, Most Great]" (lā ḥawla wa-lā quwwata illā bi-llāh^{i} [l-ʿaliyyi l-ʿaẓīm^{i}]). Most scholars, including the Malikis, Shafi'is, and Hanbalis, view this as only recommended; however, others, including the Hanafis and Zahiris, view it as necessary.

Immediately following the adhan, it is recommended to recite the following supplications:

1. A testification of faith

وَأَنَا أَشْهَدُ أَنْ لَا إِلَٰهَ إِلَّا ٱللَّٰهُ وَحْدَهُ لَا شَرِيكَ لَهُ وَأَنَّ مُحَمَّدًا عَبْدُهُ وَرَسُولُهُ رَضِيتُ بِٱللَّٰهِ رَبًّا وَبِمُحَمَّدٍ رَسُولًا وَبِٱلْإِسْلَامِ دِينًا
wa-anā ashhadu an lā ilāha illā llāhu waḥdahu lā sharīka lah^{u}, wa-anna muḥammadan ʿabduhu wa-rasūluh^{u}, raḍītu bi-llāhi rabbā^{n}, wa-bi-muḥammadin rasūlā^{n}, wa-bi-l-islāmi dīnā^{n}
"And I testify that there is nothing worthy of worship except God, alone without a partner, and that Muhammad is his servant and messenger. I am pleased with God as lord, with Muhammad as messenger, and with Islam as religion."

2. Prayers and blessings on Muhammad and his family

ٱللَّٰهُمَّ صَلِّ عَلَىٰ مُحَمَّدٍ وَعَلَىٰ آلِ مُحَمَّدٍ كَمَا صَلَّيْتَ عَلَىٰ إِبْرَاهِيمَ وَعَلَىٰ آلِ إِبْرَاهِيمَ إِنَّكَ حَمِيدٌ مَجِيدٌ وَبَارِكْ عَلَىٰ مُحَمَّدٍ وَعَلَىٰ آلِ مُحَمَّدٍ كَمَا بَارَكْتَ عَلَىٰ إِبْرَاهِيمَ وَعَلَىٰ آلِ إِبْرَاهِيمَ إِنَّكَ حَمِيدٌ مَجِيدٌ
allāhumma ṣalli ʿalā muḥammadin wa-ʿalā āli muḥammad^{in}, kamā ṣallayta ʿalā ibrāhīma wa-ʿalā āli ibrāhīm^{a}, innaka ḥamīdun majīd^{un}, wa-bārik ʿalā muḥammadin wa-ʿalā āli muḥammad^{in}, kamā bārakta ʿalā ibrāhīma wa-ʿalā āli ibrāhīm^{a}, innaka ḥamīdun majīd^{un}
"O God! Send prayers on Muhammad and on Muhammad's family, like you sent prayers on Abraham and on Abraham's family. Indeed, you are praiseworthy and glorious. And send blessings on Muhammad and on Muhammad's family, like you sent blessings on Abraham and on Abraham's family. Indeed, you are praiseworthy and glorious."

3. Praying for Muhammad's station and virtousness

اللَّٰهُمَّ رَبَّ هَٰذِهِ ٱلدَّعْوَةِ ٱلتَّامَّةِ وَٱلصَّلاَةِ ٱلْقَائِمَةِ آتِ مُحَمَّدًا ٱلْوَسِيلَةَ وَٱلْفَضِيلَةَ وَٱبْعَثْهُ مَقَامًا مَحْمُودًا ٱلَّذِي وَعَدْتَهُ إِنَّكَ لَا تُخْلِفُ ٱلْمِيعَادَ
allāhumma rabba hādhihi d-daʿwati t-tāmmati wa-ṣ-ṣalāti l-qāʾimah^{ti}, āti muhammadan il-wasīlata wa-l-faḍīlah^{ta}, wa-bʿathhu maqāman maḥmūdan illadhī waʿadtah^{u}, innaka lā tukhlifu l-mīʿād^{a}
"O God, lord of this perfect call and established prayer! Give Muhammad the station and virtuousness, and raise him to the praiseworthy station that you promised him. Indeed, you do not neglect promises."

4. Any personal supplication made to God between the adhan and iqamah. It was narrated this is a time when supplications are especially answered and not rejected.

== Form ==
The call to prayer is said after entering the time of prayer. The muezzin usually stands during the call to prayer. It is common for the muezzin to put his hands to his ears when reciting the adhan. Each phrase is followed by a longer pause and is repeated one or more times according to fixed rules. During the first statement each phrase is limited in tonal range, less melismatic, and shorter.

Upon repetition the phrase is longer, ornamented with melismas, and may possess a tonal range of over an octave. The adhan's form is characterised by contrast and contains twelve melodic passages which move from one to another tonal center of one maqam a fourth or fifth apart. Various geographic regions in the Middle East traditionally perform the adhan in particular maqamat: Medina, Saudi Arabia uses Maqam Bayati while Mecca uses Maqam Hijaz. The tempo is mostly slow; it may be faster and with fewer melismas for the sunset prayer.

During festivals, it may be performed antiphonally as a duet. Duration can be 1 minutes, but also longer, and then continuing with the shorter iqama.

== Modern legal status ==
=== Australia ===
Generally the adhan is restricted for public broadcast by noise pollution bylaws however most mosques will broadcast it throughout their property. There have been some noise complaints at Gallipoli Mosque and Lakemba Mosque in Sydney, and a limited number of mosques have received public permission to broadcast the adhan publicly for special occasions like at the Albanian Australian Islamic Society and the Keysborough Turkish Islamic and Cultural Centre in Melbourne.

=== Bangladesh ===
In 2016, opposition leader Khaleda Zia alleged the government was preventing the broadcasting of adhans through loudspeakers, with government officials citing security concerns for the prime minister Sheikh Hasina.

=== Israel ===
In 2016, Israel's ministerial committee approved a draft bill that limits the volume of the use of public address systems for calls to prayer, particularly outdoor loudspeakers for the adhan, citing it as a factor of noise pollution, the draft bill was never enacted and has been in limbo ever since. The bill was submitted by Knesset member Motti Yogev of the far right Zionist party Jewish Home and Robert Ilatov of the right wing Yisrael Beiteinu. The ban is meant to affect three mosques in Abu Dis village of Jerusalem, disbarring them from broadcasting the morning call (fajr) prayers. The bill was backed by Prime Minister Benjamin Netanyahu who said:

"I cannot count the times — they are simply too numerous — that citizens have turned to me from all parts of Israeli society, from all religions, with complaints about the noise and suffering caused to them by the excessive noise coming to them from the public address systems of houses of prayer."

The Israel Democracy Institute, a non-partisan think tank, expressed concerns that it specifically stifles the rights of Muslims, and restricts their freedom of religion.

=== Kuwait ===
During the COVID-19 pandemic in Kuwait, some cities changed their adhan from the usual hayya 'ala as-salah, meaning "come to prayer", to as-salatu fi buyutikum meaning "pray in your homes" or ala sallu fi rihalikum meaning "pray where you are".

Other Muslim countries (notably Saudi Arabia, the UAE, Malaysia, and Indonesia) also made this change because Muslims are prohibited to pray in mosques during the pandemic as preventive measures to stop the chain of the outbreak. The basis for the authority to change a phrase in the adhan was justified by Muhammad's instructions while calling for adhan during adverse conditions.

=== Sweden ===
The Fittja Mosque in Botkyrka, south of Stockholm, was in 2013 the first mosque to be granted permission for a weekly public call to Friday prayer, on condition that the sound volume does not exceed 60 dB. In Karlskrona (province of Blekinge, southern Sweden) the Islamic association built a minaret in 2017 and has had weekly prayer calls since then. The temporary mosque in Växjö filed for a similar permission in February 2018, which sparked a nationwide debate about the practice. A yearlong permission was granted by the Swedish Police Authority in May the same year.

=== Tajikistan ===
The usage of loudspeakers to broadcast the adhan was banned in 2009 with Law No. 489 of 26 March 2009 on Freedom of Conscience and Religious Unions.

=== Turkey ===
As an extension of the reforms brought about by the establishment of the Republic of Turkey in 1923, the Turkish government at the time, encouraged by Mustafa Kemal Atatürk, introduced secularism to Turkey. The program involved implementing a Turkish adhan program as part of its goals, as opposed to the conventional Arabic call to prayer. Following the conclusion of said debates, on the 1 February 1932, the adhan was chanted in Turkish and the practice was continued for a period of 18 years. There was some resistance against the adhan in the Turkish language and protests surged. In order to suppress these protests, in 1941, a new law was issued, under which people who chanted the adhan in Arabic could be imprisoned for up to three months and be fined up to 300 Turkish lira.

On 17 June 1950, a new government led by Adnan Menderes, restored Arabic as the liturgical language.

=== Uzbekistan ===
In 2005, former Uzbek president Islam Karimov banned the Muslim call to prayer from being broadcast in the country; the ban was lifted in November 2017 by his successor, Shavkat Mirziyoyev.

In other countries, there is no written law forbidding the distribution of the call to prayer in mosques and prayer halls.

== In popular culture ==
=== In television ===
In some Muslim-majority countries, television stations usually broadcasts the adhan at prayer times, in a similar fashion to radio stations. In Indonesia and Malaysia, it is usual for all television stations to broadcast the adhan at Fajr and Magrib prayers, with the exception of non-Muslim religious stations. Islamic religious stations often broadcast the adhan at all five prayer times. Since the 1970s the adhan has been broadcast from mosques in the U.S., such as the American Moslem Society, which was established in Dearborn, Michigan.

The adhan are commonly broadcast with a visual cinematic sequence depicting mosques and worshippers attending to the prayer. Some television stations in both Malaysia and Indonesia often utilize a more artistic or cultural approach to the cinematic involving multiple actors and religious-related plotlines.

In Iran, the adhan is regularly broadcast on national television and radio, particularly for the Fajr prayer. The rendition by Rahim Moazenzadeh Ardabili, recorded in the 1950s, is one of the most well-known versions in the country and has been used in state broadcasts for decades. It remains widely recognized for its distinctive melody and delivery. His brother, Salim Moazenzadeh Ardabili, was also a recognized muezzin in Iran and regularly called the adhan after Rahim's death.

The 1991–1994 recording of Masjid al-Haram muezzin, Sheikh Ali Ahmed Mulla is best known for its use in various television and radio stations.

=== Turkish National Anthem ===
The adhan is referenced in the eighth verse of İstiklâl Marşı, the Turkish national anthem:

The sole wish of my soul, oh glorious God, from You is that,
No heathen would ever, on the bosom of my temple, lay hand!
These adhans, whose testimonies are the ground of religion,
Should resound far and wide over my eternal homeland.

=== "The Armed Man" ===
The adhan appears in "The Armed Man: A Mass For Peace" composed by Karl Jenkins.

== See also ==
- Glossary of Islam
- Outline of Islam
- Barechu, Jewish call to prayer
- Church bells, Christian call to prayer
- Dhikr, remembrance of God in Islam
- Tashahhud, testimony of faith in Islam
