= Vyatka (motor scooter) =

Brand of Soviet motor scooters

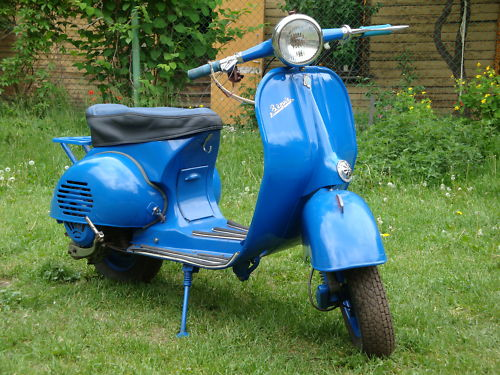
A Vyatka VP150. Note the glovebox under the seat and the Cyrillic script on the legshields

Vyatka (Russian: Вятка) was a brand of Soviet scooters manufactured by the Vyatskiye Polyany Machine-Building Plant in Vyatskiye Polyany between 1956 and 1979. The brand name was derived from both the river upon which it was located and a breed of horse native to the region.

== Models ==
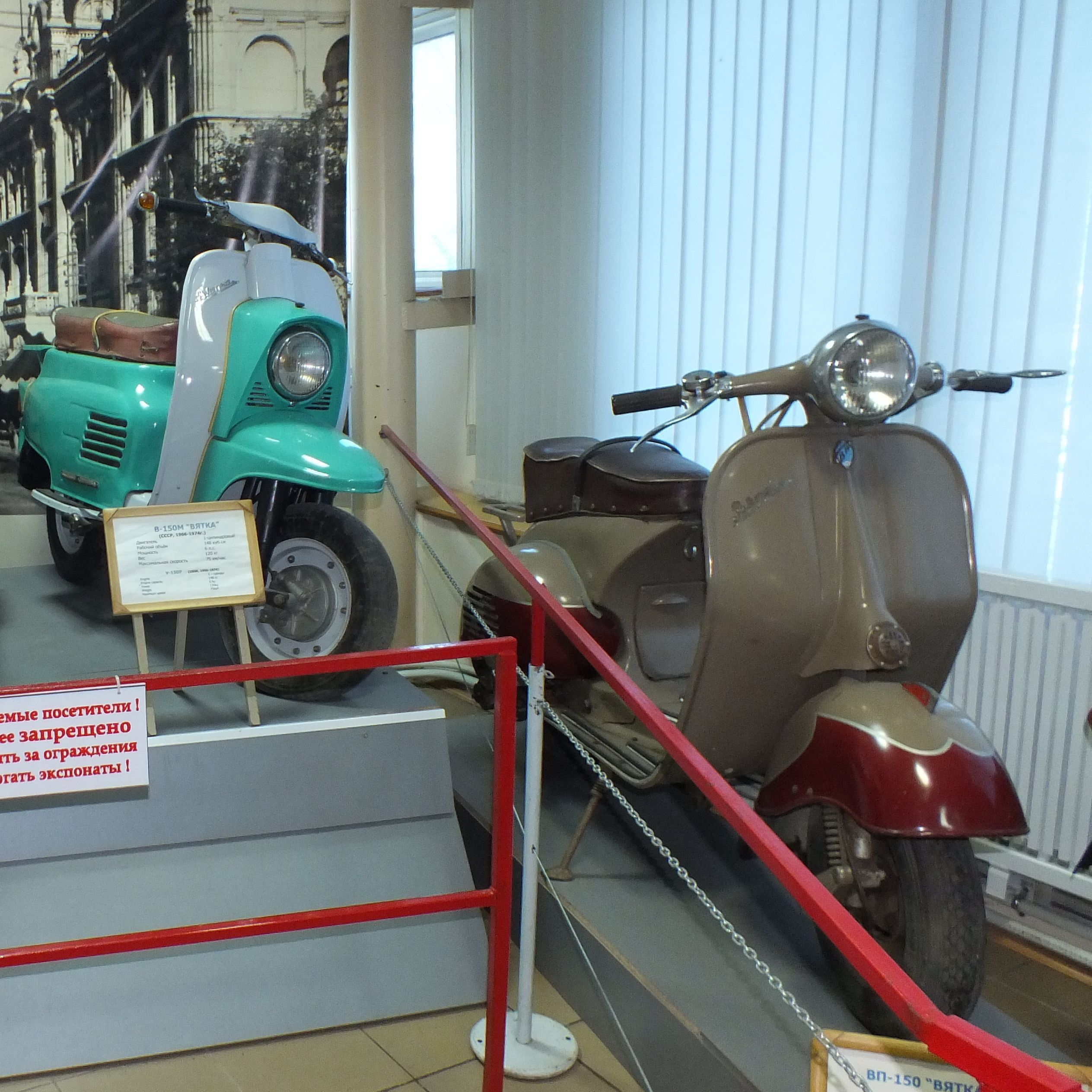
V-150M and VP-150

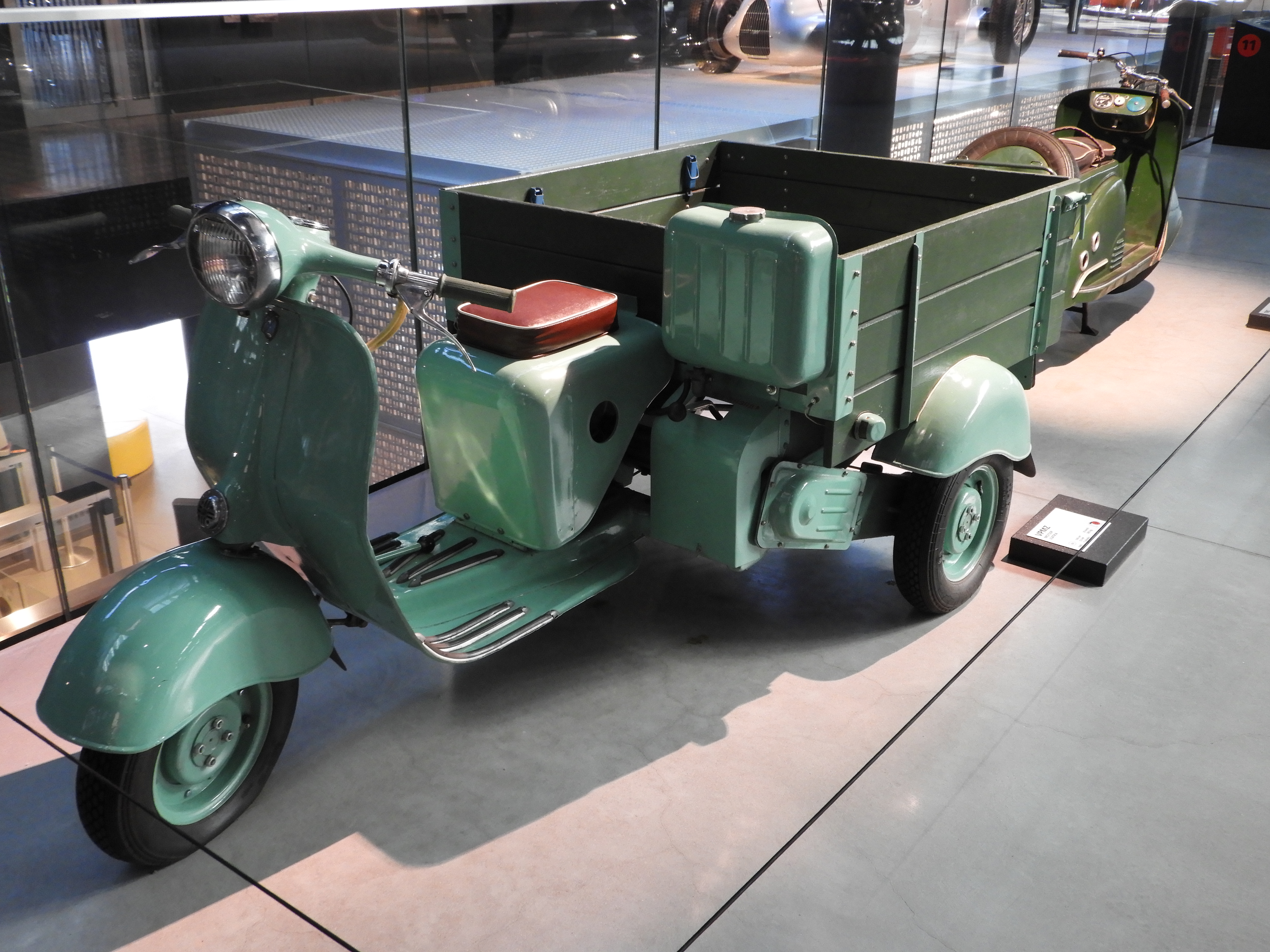
MG-150

=== VP-150 ===
The VP-150 (Russian: ВП-150) was an unlicensed copy of the Vespa 150, first built in 1956. It was constructed of thicker steel than the Vespa to cope with the poorer Russian roads. Other minor differences included thicker tyres (10x4.0 instead of 10x3.5) and an adjustable headlamp. A glovebox was also incorporated under the front seat. 300,000 models were constructed before production terminated in 1965 after complaints from Piaggio.

=== V-150M ===
The V-150M Vyatka-2 was introduced in 1966 as a successor to the VP150. It used the same engine, but mounted centrally to give better stability. Final drive was by means of an enclosed chain. The model also utilized a tubular frame and had completely different bodywork. An updated model Vyatka-3 Elektron with electronic ignition was introduced in 1973. Production ceased in 1979 with over one million units being produced. However, an excess of new old stock allowed dealers to carry on selling complete scooters until 1989 and spare parts until 1999.
