= Salim Moazenzadeh Ardabili =

Iranian maddah and muezzin (1936–2016)

Salim Moazenzadeh Ardebili
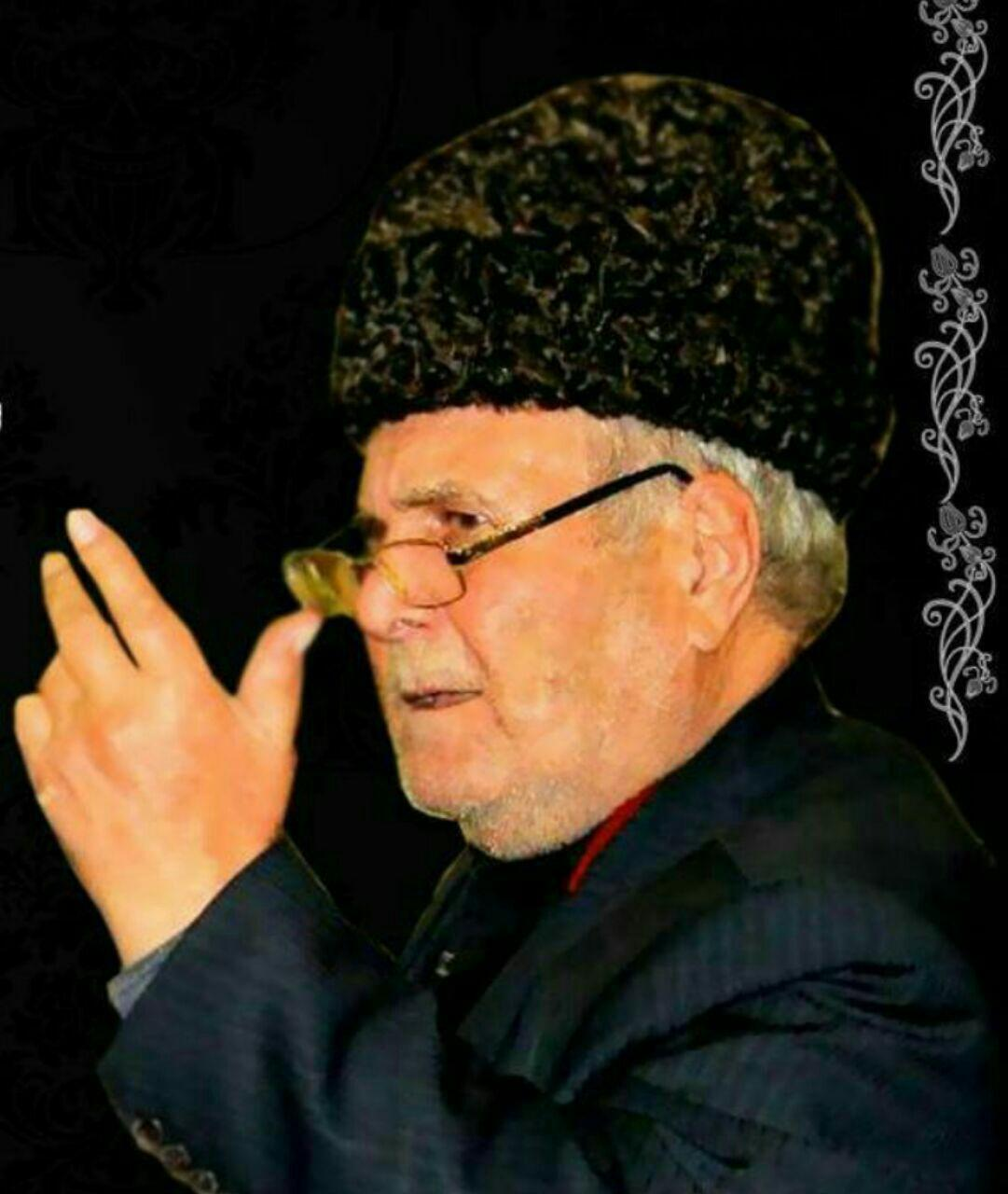
- Moazenzadeh in 2005
- Born: October 7, 1936; Ardabil, Iran
- Died: November 22, 2016 (aged 80); Ardabil, Iran
- Resting place: Behesht-e Zahra
- Occupations: Muezzin, religious singer
- Known for: Religious singing in Azerbaijani, Persian, and Arabic
- Parent(s): Abdolkarim Moazenzadeh Ardabili (father); Hanieh Mehrajie (mother)
- Relatives: Rahim Moazenzadeh Ardabili (brother)

Salim Moazenzadeh Ardabili (Persian: سليم مؤذن‌زاده اردبیلی; October 7, 1936 – November 22, 2016) was an Iranian maddah and muezzin, known for religious singing in Azerbaijani, Persian, and Arabic, all of which he was fluent in.

Moazenzadeh was born in 1936 in Tazeh Shahr, Ardabil to a religious Azeri-Iranian family. His father, Abdolkarim Moazenzadeh Ardabili, was the first muezzin on Iranian radio, and his brother, Rahim Moazenzadeh Ardabili, was also a revered muezzin who died in 2005.

In his youth and middle age, Moazenzadeh often performed for Muharram ceremonies at mosques and husayniyya in Ardabil and Tabriz. In his later years, he also performed in mosques in Tehran.

== Death ==
Moazenzadeh died on November 22, 2016, at the age of 80 in Ardabil. He was buried the following day in the Fakhra section of Behesht-e Zahra in Ardabil.

Following his death, several public figures in Iran expressed their condolences, including Ali Akbar Salehi (head of the Atomic Energy Organization), Ali Larijani (Speaker of Parliament), Abdolali Ali-Asgari (head of the Iranian national media), Seyyed Reza Salehi Amiri (Minister of Culture), Ali Younesi (former Minister of Intelligence), Ali Daei (football coach), Hassan Rouhani (President of Iran), Mohsen Rezaee (former IRGC commander), and Ezzatollah Zarghami (former head of the national broadcaster).

== Works ==
Moazenzadeh reportedly spent an average of five hours per day performing religious songs. He recorded over 2,000 cassette tapes of his performances in Azerbaijani, Persian, and Arabic since the development of recording technology in Iran.

Salim described a good religious singing voice as a "delicate art," requiring melody, tone modulation, clear diction, and suitable vocal ornaments.

Among his works are the noha (elegy) "Zaynab Zaynab" and his Ramadan recitations.

== Legacy ==
In July 2019, Salim Moazenzadeh's style of religious singing, including noha (elegy), mawlid (celebration), and munajat (supplication), was registered as an item under Iran's national List of Intangible Cultural Heritage, with the reference number 1830.
