= Muezzin =

Person appointed at a mosque to lead and recite the call to prayer

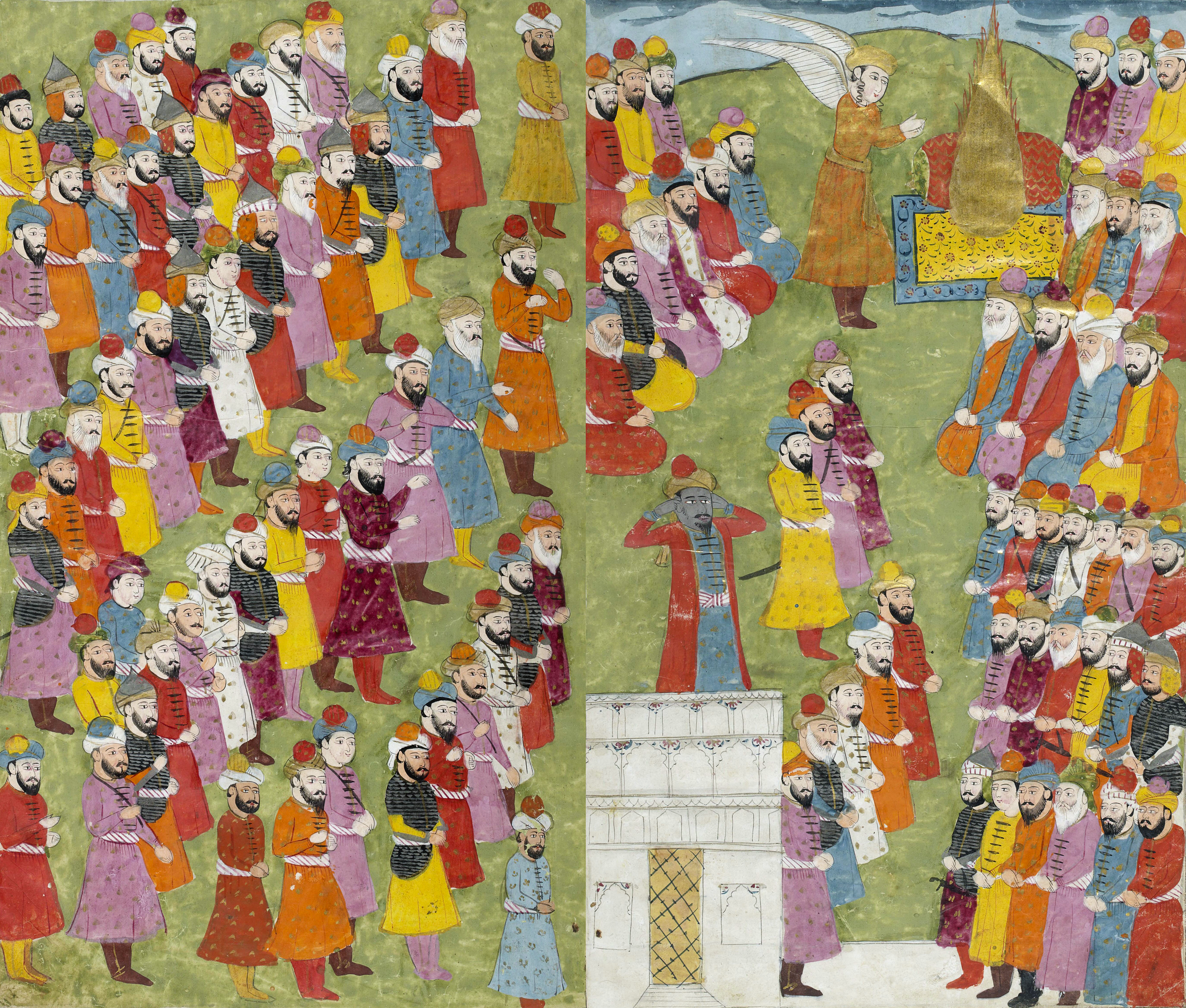
Islamic miniature depicting Gabriel providing instructions on how to perform the call to prayer to Muhammad (golden flame) as well as Bilal ibn Rabah the first muezzin calling the Muslims to prayer from atop the Kaaba

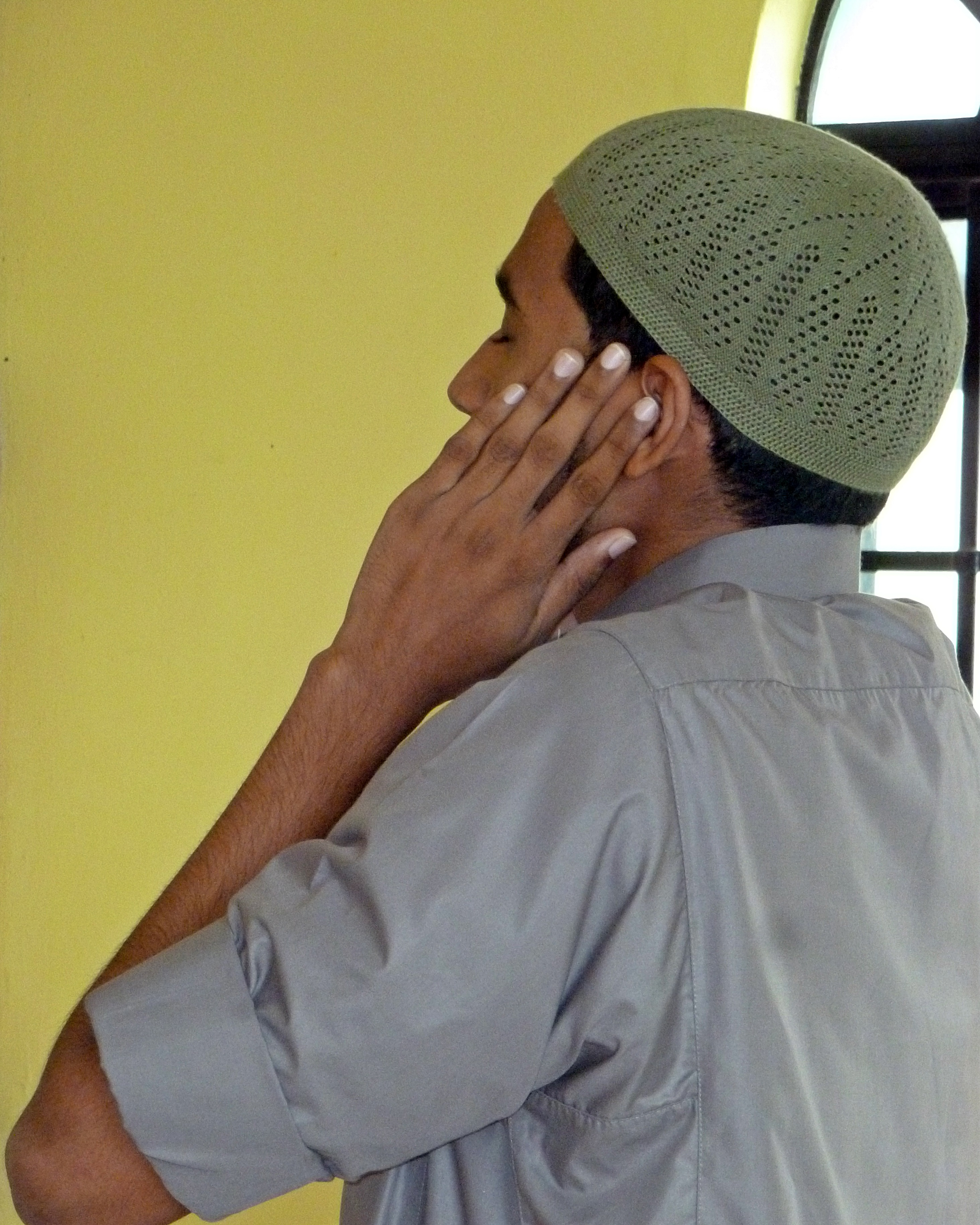
A mu'azzin reciting the adhan indoor

Muezzin (Arabic: مُؤَذِّن, romanized: Muʾadhdhin) is the person who proclaims the Adhan, the Islamic call to prayer, traditionally from a mosque's minaret, although it may also be recited elsewhere. The muezzin calls Muslims to the five daily prayers and plays an important role in the religious life of the Muslims. The institution of the muezzin dates back to the time of the Prophet Muhammad, with Bilal ibn Rabah regarded as the first muezzin.

== Etymology ==
The English word muezzin is borrowed from Arabic: مُؤَذِّن, muʾadh·dhin [mu.ʔað.ðin], simplified mu'azzin, the active participle of Arabic: أَذَّنَ "to call". Thus, it means "the calling one".

== Roles and responsibilities ==
The professional muezzin is chosen for his good character, voice and skills to serve at the mosque. Muezzins are typically men. The muezzin is not considered a cleric, as he cleans the toilets and the place where people wash their hands, face and feet when they perform the Wuḍu' (Arabic: wuḍū’ وُضُوء, the "purification" of ablution) before offering the prayer. When calling to prayer, the muezzin faces the qiblah, the direction of the Ka'bah in Makkah, while reciting the adhan.

From the fourteenth century, initially in Mamluk Egypt but then spread into other parts of the Islamic world, major mosques might employ a related officer, the muwaqqit, who determined the prayer times using mathematical astronomy. Unlike the muezzin, who were typically chosen for their piety and beautiful voice, the qualification of the muwaqqit required special knowledge in astronomy. Historian Sonja Brentjes speculates that the muwaqqit might have evolved from a specialised muezzin, and that there might not have been a clear delineation between the two offices. Some celebrated muwaqqits, including Shams al-Din al-Khalili and ibn al-Shatir, were known to have once been muezzins, and many individuals held both offices simultaneously. Today, with the production of electronic devices and authoritative timetables, a muezzin in a mosque can broadcast the call to prayer by consulting a table or a clock without requiring the specialised skill of a muwaqqit.

== Call of the muezzin ==
The call of the muezzin is considered an art form, reflected in the melodious chanting of the adhan. In Turkey, there is an annual competition to find the country's best muezzin.

Historically, a muezzin would have recited the call to prayer atop the minarets in order to be heard by those around the mosque.

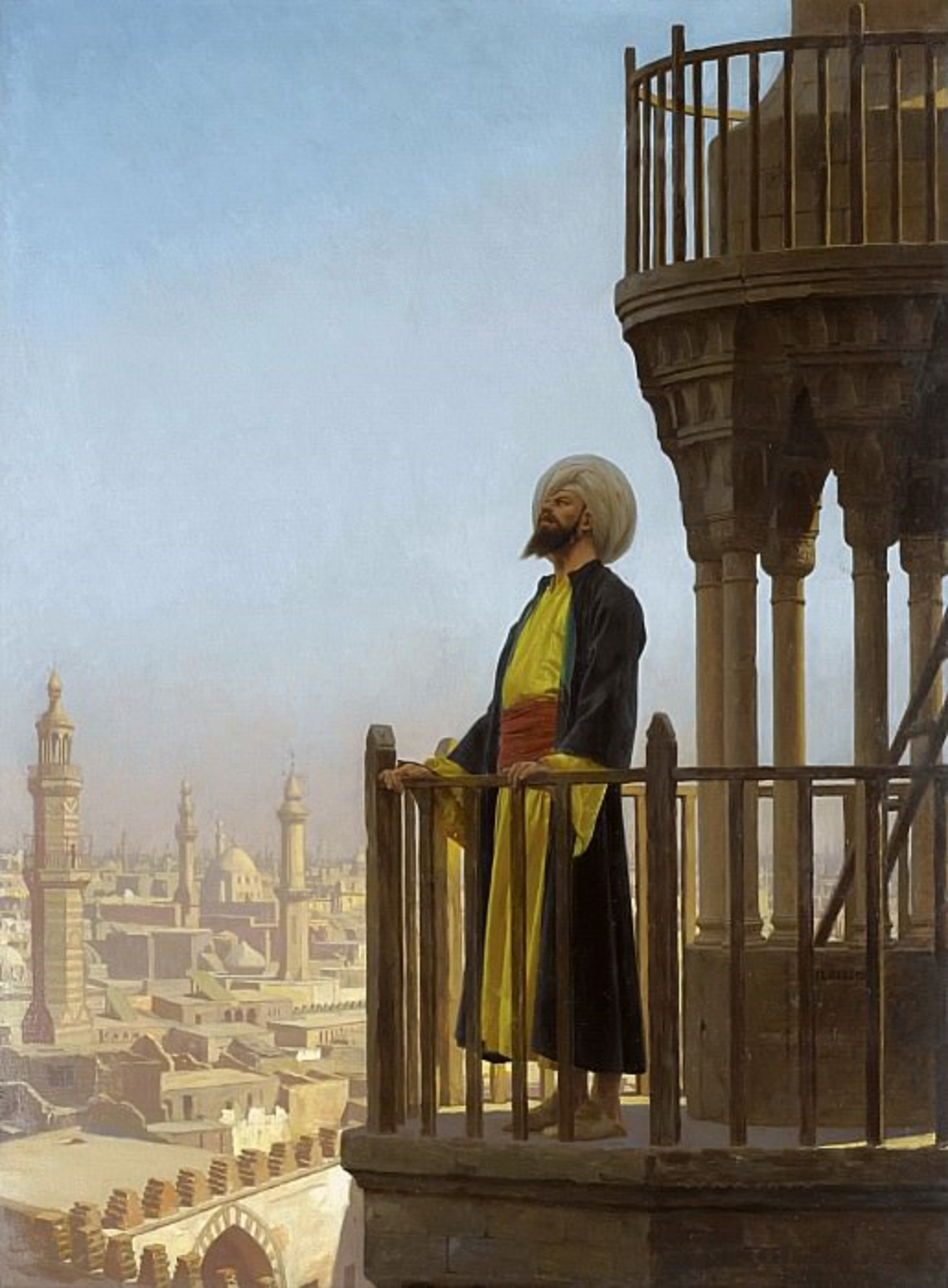
a Mu'azzin reciting the Adhan on a Minaret by Jean-Léon Gérôme (1866)

Now, mosques often have loudspeakers mounted on the top of the minaret and the muezzin will use a microphone, or a recording is played, allowing the call to prayer to be heard at great distances without climbing the minaret.

== Origins ==
The institution of the muezzin has existed since the time of Muhammad. The first muezzin was a former slave Bilal ibn Rabah, one of the most trusted and loyal sahabah (companions) of the Islamic prophet Muhammad. He was born in Mecca and is considered the first mu'azzin, chosen by Muhammad himself.

After minarets became customary at mosques, the office of muezzin in cities was sometimes given to a blind man, who could not see down into the inner courtyards of the citizens' houses and thus could not violate privacy.

== Notable muezzins ==
- Bilal ibn Rabah al-Habashi
- Rahim Moazenzadeh Ardabili
- Ali Ahmed Mulla

== See also ==
- Salah, Muslim daily prayer
- Adhan, the Islamic call to prayer, recited by the muezzin
- Schulklopfer, the Jewish equivalent of the muezzin
- Loudspeakers in mosques

== Bibliography ==
- Brentjes, Sonja (2008). "Shams al-Din al-Sakhawi on Muwaqqits, Mu'adhdhins, and the Teachers of Various Astronomical Disciplines in Mamluk Cities in the Fifteenth Century". In Emilia Calvo; Mercè Comes; Roser Puig; Mònica Rius (eds.). A Shared Legacy: Islamic Science East and West. Edicions Universitat Barcelona. ISBN 978-84-475-3285-8.
- King, David A. (1996). "On the role of the muezzin and the muwaqqit in medieval Islamic society". In E. Jamil Ragep; Sally P. Ragep (eds.). Tradition, Transmission, Transformation. E.J. Brill. pp. 285–345. ISBN 90-04-10119-5.
- Pedersen, Johannes (1991). "Masdjid: The personnel of the mosque". In Bosworth, C. E.; van Donzel, E. & Pellat, Ch. (eds.). The Encyclopaedia of Islam, Second Edition. Volume VI: Mahk–Mid. Leiden: E. J. Brill. pp. 674–677. ISBN 978-90-04-08112-3.
