= Rahim Moazenzadeh Ardabili =

Iranian muezzin (1925–2005)

Rahim Moazenzadeh Ardebili
- رحیم مؤذن‌زاده اردبیلی
- Moazenzadeh in 2005
- Born: 23 September 1925; Ardabil, Sublime State of Iran
- Died: 26 May 2005 (aged 79); Madain Hospital, Tehran, Iran
- Resting place: Ibn Babawayh Cemetery
- Occupation: Muezzin in the style of Iranian music
- Parent(s): Abdolkarim Moazenzadeh Ardebili (father); Hanieh Mehrajie (mother)
- Relatives: Salim Moazenzadeh Ardabili (brother)

Rahim Moazenzadeh Ardabili (Persian: رحیم مؤذن‌زاده اردبیلی; 23 September 1925 – 26 May 2005) was an Iranian muezzin. He is known as the "Bilal of Iran."

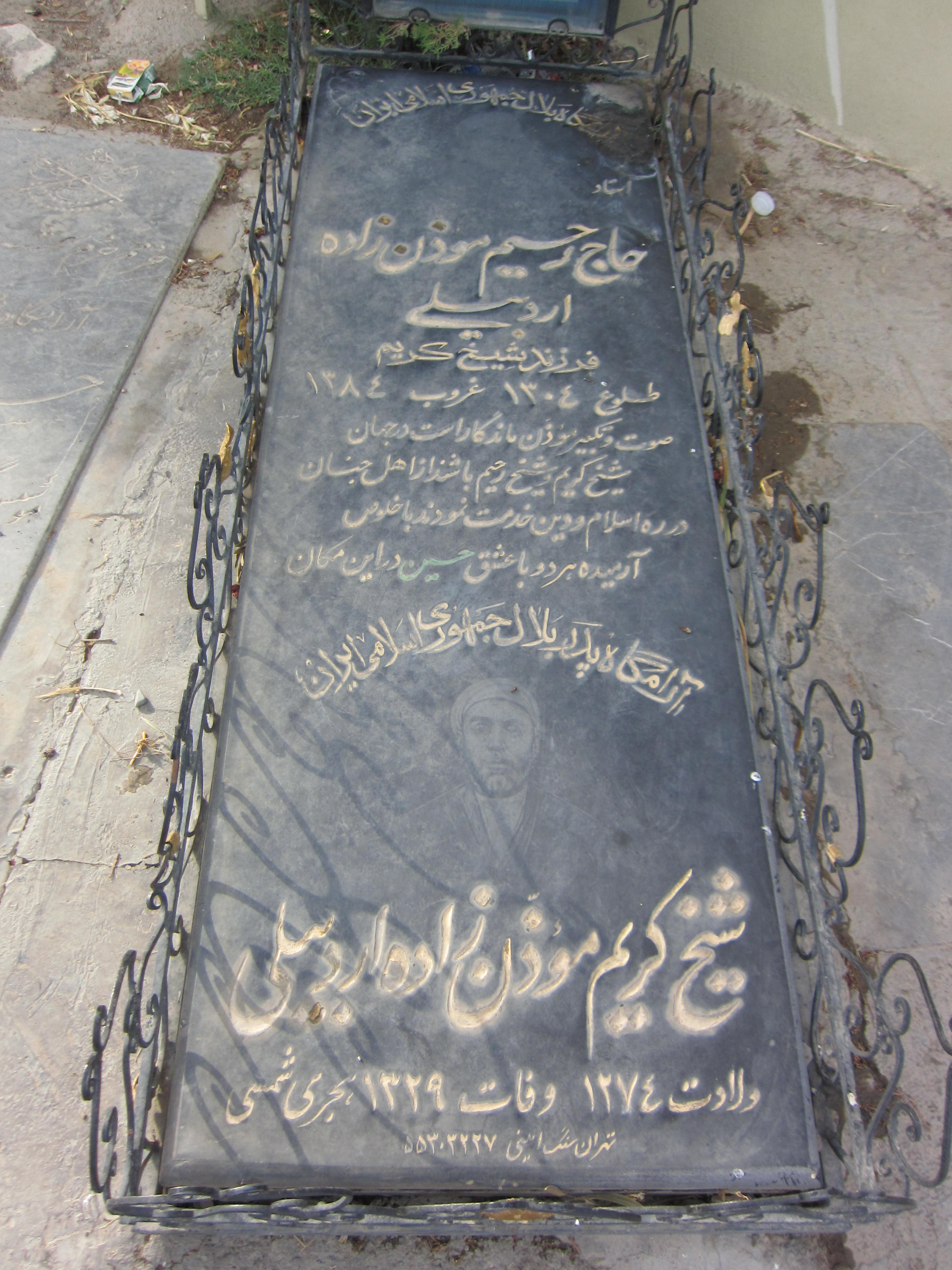
Grave of Rahim Moazenzadeh Ardabili in Ibn Babawayh Cemetery

Moazenzadeh was born in Ardabil province to a religious Azeri-Iranian family. His father Abdul Karim Moazzen Zadeh Ardabili was the first Muezzin to call the adhan, or call to prayer, on Iranian television. His voice was broadcast by radio from 1943–1947, and he carried out the morning program of radio at the Imamzadeh Mosque in Tehran, until 1947 when he died. Rahim continued to issue the call to prayer after him.

His adhan is recited in the dastgah of Bayat-e Turk, a musical scale in Azerbaijani traditional music. It can still be heard on Iranian radio and is regularly played on television. Moazenzadeh has stated:

"Since recording this piece, I have always carried a sense of spiritual pride with me throughout the years. If this spiritual wealth is the only thing that remains, it will be enough for me."

Moazenzadeh died in Tehran at the age of 80.

== Legacy ==
Moazenzadeh's adhan, recorded in 1955 while fasting, has been officially registered as an item in Iran's national List of Intangible Cultural Heritage. It is the first adhan to be included in the registry, according to Iran's Cultural Heritage Organization. It was also added to the UNESCO Memory of the World Register in 2012.

"We are Iranians, and our adhan must come from within us. Nowadays, there are muezzins who imitate Saudi styles, which is not appropriate—we must be creative ourselves. It has been 50 years, and no one has been able to recite an adhan over mine—not even my brother Salim, with his powerful and beautiful voice. This is God's will, the same God who says: ‘If you are united in calling upon Me, I will place love for you in the hearts of all.’"

— Rahim Moazenzadeh Ardabili

Iranian singer and ostad Mohammad-Reza Shajarian says about Moazenzadeh's Adhan:

"This call to prayer has two remarkable qualities. The late Moazenzadeh recited it in the Bayat-e Tork musical mode, a traditional melody known for conveying messages of hope, awakening, and spiritual awareness. His choice was deeply meaningful, as it gives a sense of promise and reassurance to listeners at any time. Additionally, there is a profound sincerity in this azan—and as someone who has worked in music for many years, I have been hearing and living with this call to prayer for 60 years."

Shahram Nazeri, another ostad and Iranian classical musician, says:

"The voice of Ostad Moazenzadeh Ardebili possesses a distinctly heroic and legendary quality. His greatest strength lies in his deep understanding and mastery of the style and expression of Iranian vocal music, to the extent that even his call to prayer (Adhān) is performed in an Iranian melodic style rather than an Arabic one."
