= List of motor scooter manufacturers and brands =

A scooter (also known by the full name motor-scooter), is a subset of motorcycles with a step-through frame, a seat, and a platform for the rider's feet (as opposed to straddling the vehicle like a conventional motorcycle). Other common (but non-defining) traits of scooters can include: bodywork (so the mechanicals are not exposed like a conventional motorcycle), motors combined with the suspension or wheel (rather than attached to the frame like a conventional motorcycle), leg shields, smaller wheels than a conventional motorcycle, shiftless transmissions, and an alternative to a chain drive.

Scooters can share some traits with mopeds (some models could even be considered both a moped and a scooter). Adding to the confusion between them, in many jurisdictions smaller engined scooters (e.g. 50cc) are road registered in the same legal category as conventional mopeds (often named "Moped" class), leading to scooters being casually referred to as "mopeds" in such areas. Underbones also can share traits with scooters (e.g. small and step-through design), but they are generally not strictly considered scooters in the purest sense as they do not have a platform for the rider's feet, but they are often casually referred to as scooters (especially ones with leg shields).

== Scooter brands in production ==
Manufacturer / brand	Nationality	Group / notes
AS Motors	Algeria	
Adiva	Italy/Taiwan	ADIVA S.r.l. - Maxiscooters (200–400) with a foldable roof; initial scoters in 2000 were collaborations with Benelli. Largely Taiwanese built range.
Adly	Taiwan	Her Chee Industrial Co Ltd; previously US market brands included AMS, Jui Li, and Grycner (using German supplied Sachs 505 engines). Currently Taiwanese built range.
Aeon	Taiwan	Aeon Motor
AJS	United Kingdom	Manufactured in China (from 2002)
Aprilia	Italy	Piaggio & C. SpA.
Askoll	Italy	Askoll Group; all electric range
Avangan	Iran	Manufacturer of electric scooters
Bajaj	India	Bajaj Auto Ltd; Licensed manufacturer of Vespa scooters (sold as Vespa 150) in the 1960s. Production continued after the license expired in the 1970s (sold as Bajaj); models included the Chetak (until 2006), and the Priya (subcontracted to Maharashtra Scooters Ltd to manufacture). From 2019 electric models also named Chetak, but as its own marque
Baotian	China	Baotian Motorcycle Industrial Co. Ltd, or Jiangmen Sino-HongKong Baotian Motorcycle Industrial Co. Ltd.
Benelli (1995 relaunch)	Italy	Qianjiang Motorcycle (Geely Holding Group)
Beta	Italy	
BMW	Germany	BMW Motorrad
Čezeta (2018 relaunch)	Czech Republic	Project by DEVS that was operated in the now liquidated company Čezeta Motors s.r.o.
CFMoto	China	Partners with KTM
Chetak	India	Electric models built by Bajaj
Chicago Scooter Company	United States	Genuine Scooter Company; US brand of Chinese manufactured scooters
Dafra	Brazil	Itavema Group; assembler of various Asian manufactured scooters
Daelim / DNA Motors	South Korea	Formerly named Daelim Motor Company and Daelim Motorcycle, renamed DNA Motors in 2021; however the Daelim brand name is still used in some markets (e.g. UK).
Derbi	Spain	Piaggio & C. SpA.
Di Blasi Industriale	Italy	Range of folding mopeds
Garelli (relaunched)	Italy	All electric; produced by Baotian
Geely / Jiming	China	Geely Motorcycle/Jiming, a subsidiary of Geely Holding Group
Genuine	United States	Genuine Scooter Company; US brand selling Asian manufactured scooters. Initially with Indian LML Vespa style metal bodied scooters (as the Genuine Stella), moving on to Taiwanese PGO Scooters; includes the Buddy model range.
GOVECS	Germany/Poland	All electric range; based in Germany, manufactured in Poland
Gilera	Italy	Piaggio & C. SpA.
Gogoro	Taiwan	Gogoro Inc.
Hero	India	Hero MotoCorp (formerly Hero Honda). Models include Hero Pleasure and Hero Maestro
Honda	Japan	Honda Motor Co., Ltd.; manufactured in various plants including in Japan and Thailand
Italjet	Italy	Velocifero (1994-2000), Dragster (1998–2003). A rebooted Dragster was put in production in 2022.
Junak	Poland	
Kawasaki	Japan	Kawasaki Heavy Industries
KR Motors (Hyosung)	South Korea	KR Motors Co. Ltd, formerly a division of the Hyosung Group and manufactured products sold as Hyosung brand, part of LVMC Holdings (2014).
Kymco	Taiwan	Kwang Yang Motor Co, Ltd
Lambretta (2018 relaunch)	Switzerland	Lambretta GmbH (joint venture of the Swiss Lambretta Consortium/Innocenti SA. and the Austrian KSR Group); V models designed by Austrian firm Kiska, and produced in Asia based on SYM mechanicals. Later models include the G350, a monocoque steel chassis design.
Lifan	China	Lifan Industry (Group) Co., Ltd.; production facilities in various countries
Loncin	China	Manufactured by Longxin Motorcycle Industry Co., Ltd a subsidiary of Loncin Holdings; uses brand names Italika (Mexico), AKT (Colombia), Viper (Ukraine), Minsk (Russia & Belarus), and Zanella (Argentina)
Mahindra	India	Mahindra Two Wheelers, a division of Mahindra & Mahindra
Malaguti	Italy	KSR Group GmbH (Austria); relaunched 2018 after a 2011 bankruptcy
MBK (formerly Motobécane)	France	Yamaha
Modenas	Malaysia	Began production in 1996. Kawasaki has a 30% ownership, but Modenas also has commercial relationships with many other Asian brands.
MZ	Germany	
NIU	China	All electric range by Niu Technologies. Early adopters of lithium-ion batteries.
Peugeot	France	Joint venture between Mahindra and Mahindra and PSA
PGO Scooters	Taiwan	Motive Power Industry; originally in collaboration with Piaggio until 1982. Models include Bubu, G-Max, and PMX. Manufacturers of Genuine Scooters's Buddy and Roughhouse models.
Piaggio	Italy	Piaggio & C. SpA.; Production facilities in Italy and China
Rex	Germany/China	German brand of Asian sourced scooters made by Baotian and Jinan Qingqi
QJMotor	China	Made by Qianjiang Motorcycle, a subsidiary of Geely Holding Group
Rieju	Spain	
Qianjiang	China	Qianjiang Motorcycle
Qingqi	China	Jinan Qingqi Motorcycle Co., Ltd
SFM (formerly Sachs)	Germany	
Scarabeo	Italy	Produced by Aprilia. Initially an Aprilia model introduced in 1993, Scarabeo is now brand in its own right within the Piaggio group. Range has included 50 to 500cc models.
Scomadi	United Kingdom	Scomadi Worldwide Ltd; UK designed, assembled in Thailand with Asian components
SEAT	Spain	All electric range. SEAT MO 125, white-label product for Silence S01
Singer	Bangladesh	Singer Corporation. Chinese made scooters for the Bangladeshi market, from 2012
Super Soco	China	Vmoto Soco group, all electric range.
Sinnis	China	Jinan Qingqi Motorcycle Co., Ltd
Solifer	Finland	Solifer Oy; once a manufacturer (1950s-1980s), scooters are now all Chinese imports
SYM	Taiwan	
Suzuki	Japan	Suzuki Motor Corporation; manufactured in various plants including in Japan, China (including Jincheng Group), and India
Tell	Switzerland	Brand of supermarket chain Landi; scooters are Chinese sourced
Taiwan Golden Bee (TGB)	Taiwan	Originally produced Vespa components, TGB now also manufactures CVTs for Piaggio, Rotax, Peugeot Motocycles, Minarelli, Morini, Polaris and SYM.
TVS	India	Sundaram - Clayton Limited; models include the TVS Scooty
Unu	Germany	All electric range
Vectrix	USA/Poland	USA made electric scooters (2006–2013). Relocated to Poland and back in production in 2015 under GOVECS ownership.
VMS Industries	Algeria	Algerian company specializing in the distribution, sales, and potentially manufacturing of motorcycles, scooters,
Vespa	Italy	Piaggio & C. SpA.; engine plant in Italy; bodies built in various locations including Indonesia and Vietnam.
Viar	Indonesia	
Yamaha	Japan	Yamaha Motor Company; Originally made in Japan, but various models are also made or assembled in Yamaha plants in other countries like Indonesia, Singapore or Vietnam, Taiwan, and Philippines.
Zongshen	China	Chongqing Zongshen Power Machinery Company; has a relationship with Piaggio through Zongshen Piaggio Foshan Motorcycle Co., Ltd
Znen / Zhongneng	China	Zhongneng Vehicle Group Co., Ltd.; petrol and electric scooters. Sold under numerous brands including Qianxifeng, Jinlun (worldwide), Lexmoto (UK), Tamoretti (UK, Netherlands), Dorton (Spain), Mondial (Turkey), and in the USA Paparazzi's, Flyscooters, Lance, and BMS. Owners of Moto Morini.
Z Electric Vehicle	USA	All electric range

== Scooter brands and manufacturers no longer in scooter production ==
- Accumolli (1950), Piaggio powered — Italy
- Achilles (1953–1957) — West Germany
- ACMA (Vespa) (1951–1962), Ateliers de Construction de Motocycles et Accessoires — France
- Adonis (1949–1952), Société du Scooters Adonis; 50 and 75cc VAP engines — France
- Aermacchi (1951–1969) — Italy
- Aermoto (1938–1940), Sachs powered — Italy
- Agrati (1958–1965), Merged with Garelli in 1961, scooters branded as Garelli Capri from 1965 — Italy
- Allstate/Sears (1948–1967), Brand of retailer Sears to rebadge scooters manufactured by Cushman, Piaggio and Puch. The Allstate name was replaced with "Sears" for 1966-1967 — USA
- American Motor Scooter Corporation (1960–1965), Clinton powered folding "suitcase" scooters; Founded by USA Lambretta parts dealer, taken over by American Lincoln Corporation — USA
- Allwyn (1974—?), the Pushpak model was a Lambretta GP based scooter manufactured by Andhra Pradesh Scooters Limited, who later also made licensed Vespa PL170s (1983–1986) — India
- Arctic Cat (2000s) — USA
- Ardent (1949–1954), Manufacture Française des Scooters Ardents; initially motorcycle scooter hybrids; Le Poulain and VAP engines — France
- Auteco Lambretta / Auteco (1954—1970s), small scale assembly of Lambrettas badged as "Auteco Lambretta"; (1990s), Bajaj importers — Colombia
- Autoglider (1919–1922) — United Kingdom
- Autoped (1915–1921) — USA
- (API) Lambretta / API (1955–1990), models called Lamby Polos after SIL obtained use of the Lambretta name in the 1970s — India
- Bernardet (1948–1959) — France
- Bianchi (1960s) Orsetto, also made under licence in the UK by Raleigh as the Roma (1961–64) — Italy
- BSA (1958–1965) — United Kingdom
- Bitri (1955–1964) — Netherlands
- Bond (1957–1962), Makers of Bond Minicars; Villiers powered — United Kingdom
- Bonvinci Marino (BM) (1959–1964), Models included Minotauro (75cc) and Pokerino (50cc) — Italy
- Brockhouse Corgi (1946–1954), Civilian version of the military Welbike. Built by Brockhouse Engineering Ltd., and sold as brands including Indian Papoose in the USA — United Kingdom
- Brumana Pugliese (1970–1980), Lambretta models plus its own models — Brazil
- Busi (1940–1951) — Italy
- Cagiva — Italy
- Cazenave (1954–1960), Mistral and Ydral engines — France
- Centaur (1960–1965), Clinton powered folding "suitcase scooter" made by Alexander Reynolds Co. Folding Scooters — USA
- Čezeta (CZ), (1957–1964) — Czechoslovak Socialist Republic
- Concord (1950s), See Manurhin below — France
- Coaster (1950s), Jet 200cc model, made by Sanko Kogyo (a spin-off from Nakajima Aircraft Company), then briefly by Sankar Manufacturing Inc, and finally by Nippon Motor Co. — Japan
- CubStar (1950—?), Scooter with moped style bicycle pedals, probably 50cc Honda powered. Made by Ruby Nikken Industry Co., Ltd. — Japan
- Cushman (1936–1965) — USA
- Cycle-Scoot (1950s) — USA
- Danmotor Vespa Indonesia (1970s), Licensed Vespa 90cc and 150cc models — Indonesia
- Dayton (1954–1960), models included Albatross (powered by 224cc Villiers 1H engine) and Flamenco — United Kingdom
- DKR (1957–1967), DKR Company formed by Day & Robinson of Willenhall Radiators, and Cyril Kieft. Models included the Dove, Pegasus, and Capella, powered by various Villiers engines. — United Kingdom
- DKW (1921–1922, 1954–1957) — Germany / West Germany
- DMW (1957–1967) — United Kingdom
- Doodle Bug (1946–1948), built by the Beam Manufacturing Company, and sold by retailer Gambles store chain under the Hiawatha name — USA
- Douglas (Vespa) (1951–1965), licence built Vespas — United Kingdom
- Ducati — Italy
- Durkopp (1954–1960) — West Germany
- FAKA (1952–1957), Took over production of Walba scooters — West Germany
- (Fenwick) Lambretta (1951–1960) — France
- FIAMC (Fabbrica Italiana Auto Moto Cicli) (1950s) — Italy
- Fly / Flyscooters (2006–2010), Florida based distributors of Chinese and Taiwanese built scooters, particularly Znen — USA
- Frambretta (1970s—?), Truck versions of Siambretta's licence built Lambrettas — Argentina
- Fuji (1946–1968), In addition to the Rabbit marque of Fuji Heavy Industries (parent company of Subaru), Fuji also made the Go-Devil folding "suitcase scooter" from 1964 to 1967 — Japan
- Garelli (1965–1970), post-merger re-branding of the Agrati Capri — Italy
- Generic (2000s), Former brand of Austrian KSR Group used for Asian imports — Austria
- Glas Gogo (1950–1967) — West Germany
- Gitan (1960s), produced by Moto Gitane, models included the 50cc Joligri — Italy
- Guizzo (1955–1964), built by Palmieri & Gulinelli of Bologna — Italy
- Harley-Davidson — USA
- Heinkel (1953–1965) — West Germany
- Hercules (1950s—1970s), Absorbed into Sachs in 1963. Models included a rebadged KTM pony, and E1 electric scooter in the 1970s — West Germany
- Hoffman (Vespa) (1950–1955), licence built Vespas — West Germany
- Hirano Pop (1952–1961), Hirano Manufacturing Co., Ltd., several 50cc and 80cc 2-stroke models including the Poppet — Japan
- Indian — USA
- Iso (1948–1957) — Italy
- IWL (1955–1965) — East Germany
- James (1960—1962?), 150cc two-stroke — United Kingdom
- Jawa (1950s—1960s & 1990s), '60s models include the Manet and Tatran — Czechoslovak Socialist Republic / Czech Republic
- Jonghi (1953–1957) — France
- Kieft (1955–1957), Importer and distributor of the German Hercules Company mopeds and scooters; Succeeded by the DKR Company — United Kingdom
- Kilworth (1920s), designed by Alvis car engineer Captain Smith-Clarke; the forerunner to modern CVT automatic scooters — United Kingdom
- Kinetic (1998–2008) — India
- Kinetic Honda (1984–1998) — India
- Kosty/Kauba (1952 (Kosty), 1953—1956 (Kauba)), Rotax 2 stroke engines, models included the Lux 98 and Lux 125 — Austria
- Kreidler — Germany
- Krupp (1919–1922), licence built Autoped — Germany
- KTM (1960s) models included the Pony (1960-) and Pony 2 (1962-), and Comet (1963-) — Austria
- Lacombe (1948–1954), P.P. Roussey two-stroke engines; also known as the Comindus. — France
- Lambretta (Innocenti parent factory) (1947–1972) — Italy
- Lambretta do Brasil (formerly Pasco Lambretta) (1955–1964) — Brazil
- Lamby (1977–1990), brand of API — India
- Laverda (1960–1962), models included Mini 60 and Mini-Scooter. (2000–2004), re-branded Asian sourced scooters — Italy
- LML (formerly Lohia Machines Ltd) (1984–2017), Licensed partner of Piaggio until 1999 building Vespa based scooters, including the Select and Star models. Bankrupt 2017, factory dismantled and plant sold off (but as of 2021 planning to return as LML Electric with electric scooters) — India
- Lohner (1950–1963), Rotax-Sachs and ILO engines; Merged with the Rotax engine company to form Lohner-Rotax in 1959 — Austria
- MAC (1972–1977), brand of API — India
- Maico (1955–1966), models included the Maicoletta — West Germany
- Manet (1960s), models included the S100 and Tatran 125. Taken over by Jawa, production ended 1967 — Czechoslovak Socialist Republic
- Manurhin (1952–1962), Initially a licensed DKW Hobby scooter; sold in the UK as Concord brand — France
- Mercury (1956–1958) (not to be confused with USA Mercury), Models included 50cc Hermes — United Kingdom
- Messerschmitt (Vespa) (1955–1964), licence built Vespas — West Germany
- Meteora (1950s), NSU powered — Italy
- M.I.S.A. (Vespa) (1954–1962) Motor Industry Société Anonyme assembled 125 & 150 Vespa models, sold as Vespa — Belgium
- Mitsubishi (1946–1963) — Japan
- Molot (1999—?), See Vyatka below — Russia
- Monark (1957–1969) — Sweden
- Motobi (1963–1968), 50 and 100cc scooters; Relaunched by Austrian partnership in 2010 including a scooter line — Italy
- Motoflash (1950s), 50cc and 75cc two-stroke engines — Italy
- Motobloc / Riva Sport Industries (RSI) (1950s), Initially sold the Swiss AMI scooter as the Ami Motobloc. The Sulky was developed with RSI — France
- Motoblic (1960s), Models included a 75cc model, and Stela 100cc model — Spain
- Moto Guzzi (1950–1966) — Italy
- Motus (20??—2017), Christchurch based NZ brand that sold Taizhou Zhongneng Motorcycle Co. Ltd. scooters manufactured in China — New Zealand
- Motovespa (1953–2000), licensed Vespas, taken over by Piaggio — Spain
- Moto-Zeta (2000s), Italian company selling imported Chinese scooters of 50-250cc in Europe — Italy
- MV Agusta (1950s) — Italy
- Nibbio (1947–1952), Initially manufactured by Gianca, transferring to San Christopher in 1949 — Italy
- NSU (1951–1957), licensed Lambretta 125cc LC; from 1956 their own "Prima" range based on modified Lambretta designs — Germany
- N-Zeta (1960s) — New Zealand
- Orix (1950–1954) 125cc and 175cc models, including the JLO-powered Orix-Prina — Italy
- Paloma (1954–1969), Etablissements Michel Humblot; Acquired by Cazenave in 1964 — France
- Parilla (1952–1959) Levriere 125cc and 150cc models — Italy
- (Pasco) Lambretta (1964–1982), Originally Lambretta do Brasil, became Brumana Pugliese S.A. making its own small motorcycle models and a modified Lambretta Series III — Brazil
- Peirspeed, Re-badged TGB — USA
- Piatti (1954–1957) — Belgium / United Kingdom
- Powell Manufacturing Company (1940s) — USA
- Prina (1949–1954) 125cc two-stroke scooter, in 1952 the 175cc JLO-powered Orix-Prina in conjunction with Orix — Italy
- Prior (1950s), Rebadged German Hercules scooters by Industria Ltd of London for the UK and Commonwealth markets, models included the Viscount — United Kingdom/West Germany
- Puch — Austria
- Rabbit, (1946–1968), Brand of Fuji Heavy Industries. The first model, S-1, entered production 6 months before the Vespa — Japan
- Rabeneick (1960s), while under Hercules ownership models included a KTM Pony 2 rebadged as R50 — West Germany
- Ravat — France
- Renault (2000s), Car manufacturer Renault sold an Italian made roofed scooter (which was a joint venture between Benelli and Adiva SRL), as the Renault Full Time — France
- Reynolds Runabout (1919–1924), Jackson Car Manufacturing Co and later by A. W. Wall — United Kingdom
- Riverside (1960s), Brand of retailer Montgomery Ward manufactured by various imported makes, including the Japanese Mitsubishi Silver Pigeon — USA
- Rock-Ola (1938–1940) — USA
- Royal Enfield India (1962—1970s) Fantabulous model, 175cc 2-stroke Villiers powered — India
- Rumi (1954–1969) Formichino model — Italy
- Salsbury (1936–1950), Californian businessman E. Foster Salsbury introduced the CVT. Models included the Motor Glide (the world's first commercially viable motor scooter). — USA
- Schwinn — USA
- Scootavia (1951–1956) — France
- Scoto (1949–1950), Moped/scooter hybrid built by MGT (Million-Guiet-Tubauto) — France
- Scotta (1952–1953), 125cc Motorcycle/scooter hybrid — France
- Serveta / Lambretta SAL (1954–1989), License built Lambrettas, named "Lambretta SAL" after 1982 — Spain
- Siam-bretta / Siambretta (1948–1970), Licence built Lambrettas — Argentina
- Siamoto (1996–1999), Models included the Scross off-road scooter — Italy
- SICRAF (Paul Vallée Motos) (1949–1954), Societe Industrielle de Construction et de Recherches Automobiles de France; Aubier-Dunne and Ydral engines — France
- SIM (Società Italiana Motoscooters) / SIM-Moretti (1953–1955) — Italy
- Simard (1951–1954), Ydral and AMC engines — France
- Simonetta / San Cristoforo (1952–1954), Later version of the Nibbio built by San Cristoforo under licence from Ravat of France — Italy
- Simson (1955–2002) — East Germany / Germany
- Solex (1968–1974), Micron moped with a scooter form-factor — France
- Stewart (1959–1963), acquired by BSA — New Zealand
- Strolch/Progress (1950–1960), Models included Rascal, Vagabond, Little Monkey. Name was changed to Progress in 1954 — West Germany
- Sun / Raleigh (1957–1964), Sun Cycle & Fittings Co Ltd was absorbed by Raleigh Industries in 1958. Models included the Roma, a licence built Bianchi — United Kingdom
- Swallow (1946–1951) — United Kingdom
- Tamoto (1949–1951) Motorcycle/scooter hybrids — France
- Tempo (1957–1959), Sachs powered; produced at Progress-Werke-Oberkirch AG in Germany — Norway
- Terrot (1952–1957) — France
- Tomos / Tomos Puch (1950s—?), Moped manufacturer with scooter-like models and a license built Puch scooter. Bankrupt 2019 — Slovenia (former Yugoslavia)
- TN'G — USA
- Toscane (1947) — Italy
- Tosho (1958–63), Tochang Motor Industry Co. Ltd; Pandora model powered by Tohatsu motors. Absorbed into Yamaha — Japan
- Triumph (1959–1970), models included the Tina and Tigress — United Kingdom
- TWN (Triumph-Werk Nurnberg AG) (1955) — Germany
- "Tula" / TMZ (1955–1989) Initially based on the German Goggo TA200, Tula also made three-wheeled scooters — USSR (Russia)
- Unibus (1920–1922), manufactured by Gloucestershire Aircraft Company, like the later Vespa it was designed by an aircraft engineer (also trying to diversify production after a post-war loss of war time contracts), and is one of the first scooters to have a modern-styled enclosed body. Powered by a 269cc two-stroke motor — United Kingdom
- Valmobile (1955–1961), Victor Bouffort folding "suitcase scooter" design manufactured by Martin-Moulet in France (1955–56), and Hirano Motorcycle Company of Japan (1956–61) — France & Japan
- Velocette (1960–1964) — United Kingdom
- Vento — USA
- Venus (1953–1955) — Germany
- Victa (1960s), Fuji Rabbit scooters assembled and sold by Australasian outdoor garden equipment manufacturer Victa in New Zealand — New Zealand
- Vijai (1975–1997), Lambretta GP/DL made by state-owned Scooters India Ltd (SIL), with plant acquired from the defunct Lambretta. Sold as the Vijai brand in India and as Lambretta for export markets. After 1997 it focused on three-wheelers until its closure in 2021 — India
- Vivani (1952) — Italy
- Vyatka (1956–1979; 1999—?) Initially an unlicensed copy of the Vespa 150; In 1999 Vyatskiye Polyany Machine-Building Plant was renamed Molot and started production of the Strizh scooter, but by 2017 was struggling financially — USSR (Russia) / Russia
- Walba (1949–1952), One of the first post-war German scooters, production taken over by FAKA — West Germany
- WFM (Warszawska Fabryka Motocykli) (1959–1965) Manufacturers of the Osa scooter, the Polish People's Republic's only native scooter — Poland
- Yulon (1964—?) Car-maker Yulon Motor Co. Ltd. license built Lambretta models — Taiwan
- Zeta (1948–1954) — Italy
- ZID (2000s) Degtyaryov Plant motorcycle manufacturer sold Lifan based scooters until at least 2018 — Russia
- Zündapp (1953–1964), models included the Bella and RS50 — West Germany

== See also ==
- List of motorcycle manufacturers
