= Vento =

Vento may refer to:

- Vento (surname), a Finnish and Italian surname
- Vento (motorcycle manufacturer), an Italian motorcycle manufacturer
- Volkswagen Vento (A3), a German compact sedan
- Volkswagen Vento (A05), a German subcompact sedan
- VinFast Vento, an electric scooter by VinFast from Vingroup
- Ve.n.to, an IBA official cocktail
