= TGB Blade 1000 LTX =

Utility vehicle by Taiwan Golden Bee

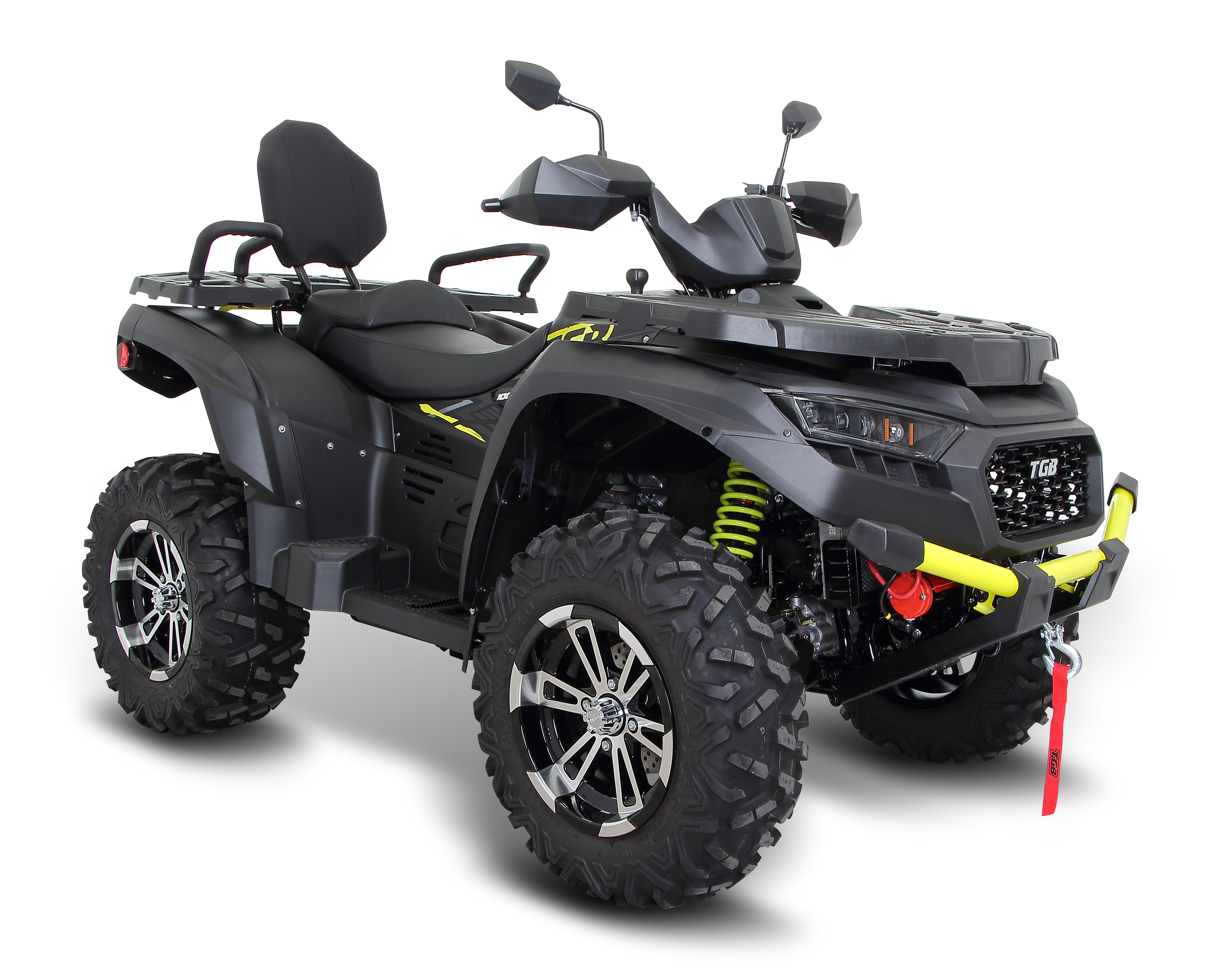
- TGB Blade 1000 LTX

Overview
- Manufacturer: Taiwan Golden Bee (TGB)
- Production: 2020–present
- Assembly: Taiwan

Body and chassis
- Class: All-terrain vehicle (ATV)
- Body style: Utility ATV

Powertrain
- Engine: 997 cc SOHC V-twin four-stroke
- Transmission: Continuously variable transmission (CVT)
- Hybrid drivetrain: Selectable 2WD/4WD with differential lock

Dimensions
- Wheelbase: 1,460 mm (57.5 in)

Chronology
- Predecessor: TGB Blade 1000

The TGB Blade 1000 LTX is a utility all-terrain vehicle (ATV) made by Taiwanese manufacturer Taiwan Golden Bee (TGB). Introduced as the flagship model of the Blade series, the vehicle is intended for recreational trail riding, agricultural work and general utility applications. It is powered by a 997 cc V-twin engine and features electronic fuel injection, selectable four-wheel drive and electronic power steering.

== History ==
The Blade 1000 LTX was first introduced in the early 2020s as an updated version of the original Blade 1000. The model received revised bodywork, improved suspension, increased cargo capacity, and new technology, including LED lighting and a digital instrument display. Depending on the market, later versions also introduced anti-lock braking systems (ABS) and TFT displays.

== Design ==
The Blade 1000 LTX is built on a tubular steel frame with independent dual A-arm suspension at the front and rear. The vehicle has front and rear cargo racks, a towing receiver, and a pre-installed electric winch. Standard equipment varies between international markets.

== Powertrain ==
The ATV is equipped with a liquid-cooled 997 cc SOHC V-twin engine producing approximately 83 horsepower (62 kW). Power is delivered via a continuously variable transmission (CVT) with high, low, neutral, reverse, and park ranges.

The drivetrain features selectable two-wheel drive and four-wheel drive, with locking front and rear differentials for increased off-road capability.

== Features ==
Standard features include:

- Electronic Fuel Injection (EFI)
- Electronic Power Steering (EPS)
- Selectable 2WD and 4WD
- Differential lock
- Hydraulic disc brakes
- LED headlights and taillights
- Digital instrument cluster
- Independent suspension
- Front and rear cargo racks
- Electric winch
- Tow hitch receiver
- Passenger seat with backrest

Equipment may vary depending on model year and market.

== Markets ==
The Blade 1000 LTX is sold in numerous international markets, including Canada, Europe, Australia, and parts of Asia through authorized TGB distributors.

== Specifications ==
The TGB Blade 1000 LTX has the following key specifications:

- Engine: 997 cc SOHC V-twin
- Cooling system: Liquid-cooled
- Fuel system: Electronic Fuel Injection (EFI)
- Transmission: Continuously Variable Transmission (CVT)
- Drive system: Selectable 2WD / 4WD
- Power output: Approximately 83 hp (62 kW)
- Fuel capacity: 23 L
- Wheelbase: 1,460 mm
- Steering: Electronic Power Steering (EPS)
- Suspension: Independent dual A-arm front and rear
- Brakes: Hydraulic disc brakes

== See also ==
- All-terrain vehicle
- Utility vehicle
- Taiwan Golden Bee
