= Brumana Pugliese =

1970–1982 Brazilian motorcycle company

Brumana Pugliese S.A.
- Predecessors: Lambretta do Brasil; Pasco Lambretta
- Founded: 1970; 56 years ago
- Defunct: 1982

Brumana Pugliese S.A. was a Brazilian motorcycle and scooter manufacturer that ceased trading in 1982. Its predecessor companies were Lambretta do Brasil and Pasco Lambretta.

== Lambretta do Brasil ==
In 1955 Paulo Pascowitch obtained a licence to manufacture Lambretta scooters in Brazil. Brazil's first automotive plant was constructed in Lapa, São Paulo for these purposes. The factory initially manufactured Lambretta LD models but these were replaced by the more modern Series II in 1960. Over 50,000 scooters a year were being built at this time.

== Pasco Lambretta ==
In 1964 Lambretta do Brasil changed its name to Pasco Lambretta after its founder. A new 175cc machine based on the TV Series III was also introduced. This was built alongside the existing Series II models.

== Brumana Pugliese S.A. ==
In 1970 Pasco Lambretta became Brumana Pugliese S.A. when it was bought by Philip Pugliese, the largest shareholder, and Oliveiro Brumana. They planned to expand the company and built a new factory which covered 19,000 square meters. Unfortunately these expansion plans coincided with the introduction of Japanese motorcycles to the Brazilian market. Brumana Pugliese faced stiff competition and responded by introducing new and updated models. They also unsuccessfully tried to enter the United States market using a Serveta importer. However all these attempts failed to increase sales and the company went bankrupt in 1982.

=== Models ===
Unlike its predecessors Brumana Pugliese developed a number of its own models. These included the following:

==== Xispa ====
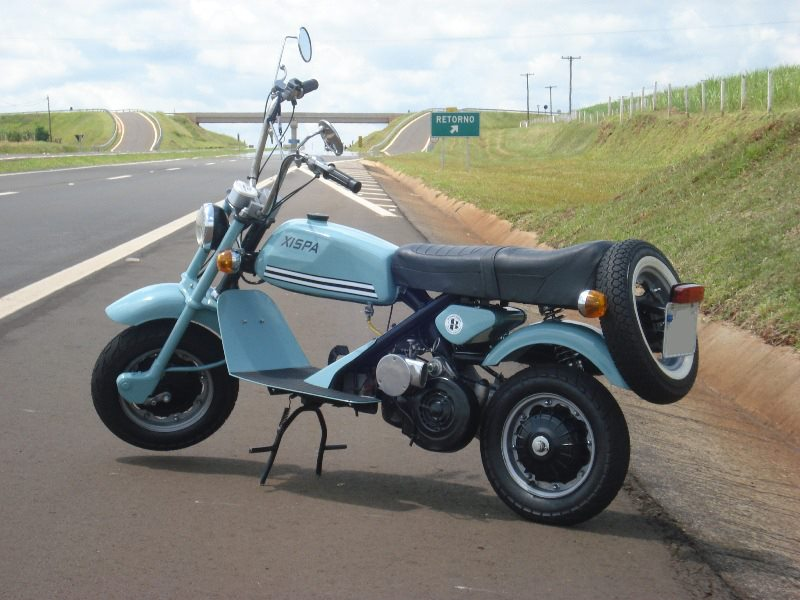
A Brumana Pugliese Xispa

This was a Monkey bike style machine which used the standard Lambretta wheels, engine and transmission. However it had heavily modified forks and a completely different frame. The Xispa was in production from 1971 to 1979.

==== MS ====
The MS was a modified Lambretta Series III with very narrow leg shields and cropped side panels that revealed the engine's crankcase. It was first produced in 1973 and was colloquially known as the 'mini-saia' (mini-skirt).

==== Ponei ====
Between 1976 and 1980 Brumana Pugliese built a moped known as the Ponei (pony). It used a Minarelli engine.

== See also ==
- List of motor scooter manufacturers and brands
