= Auteco =

Motor vehicle manufacturer

Auto Tecnica Colombiana S.A

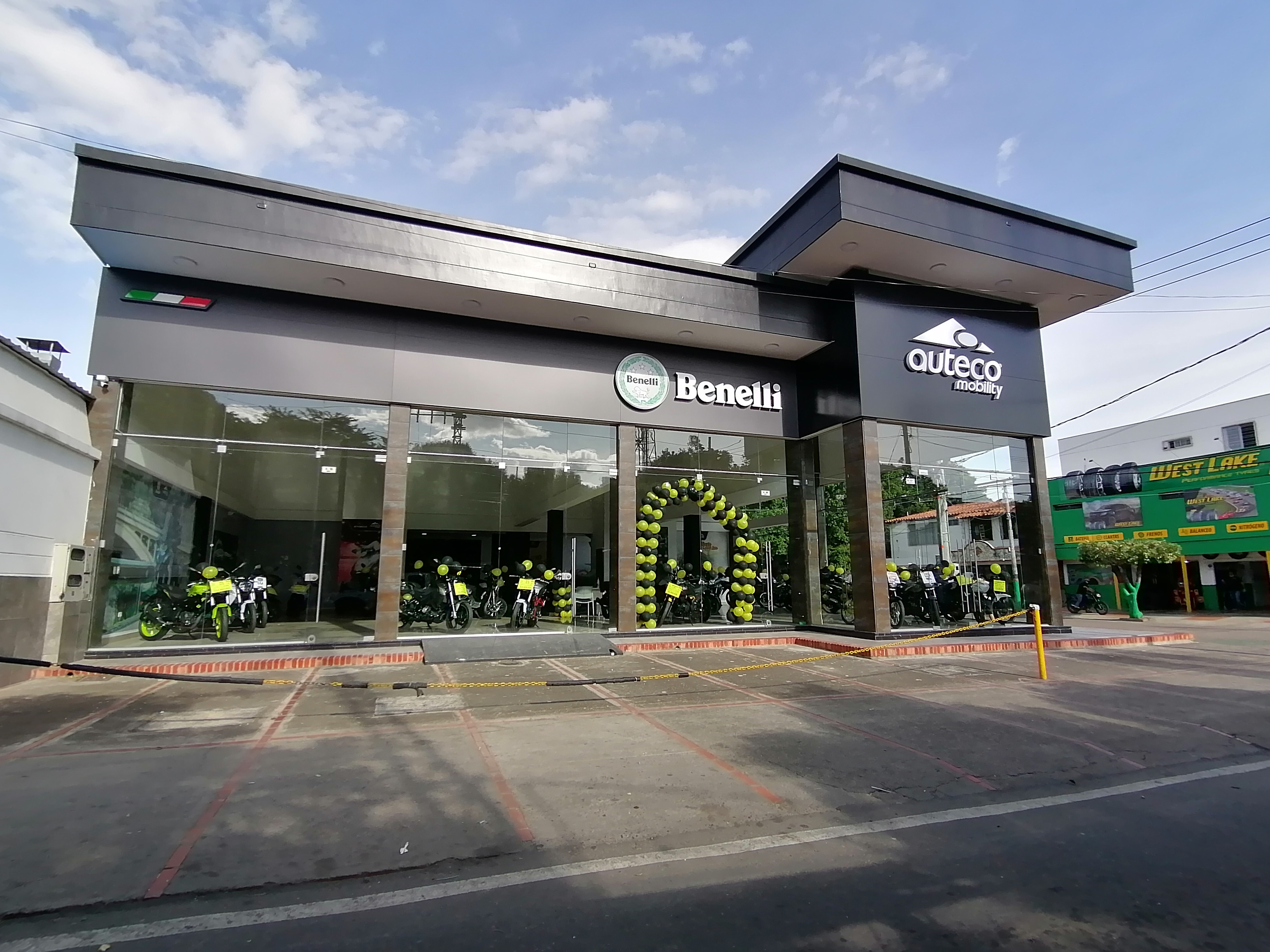
- Agency in cucuta
- Company type: S.A.
- Industry: Automotive
- Founded: 1941
- Headquarters: Medellín
- Products: Motorcycles; Light machinery
- Website: http://www.auteco.com.co

Auteco (Auto Tecnica Colombiana S.A) is a Colombian motor vehicle manufacturer. It was the first motorcycle assembler in the country.

== History ==
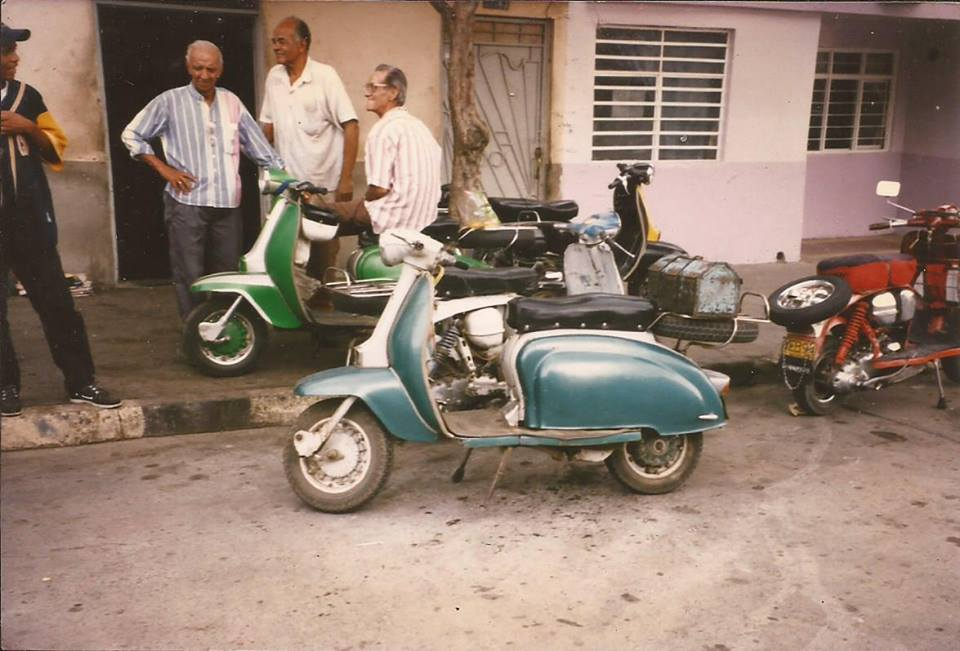
A typical Auteco Lambretta hybrid. This one has a Series II frame and a Series III front-end.

Auteco was founded on 1 September 1941 in Medellín. It initially distributed spare parts and petrol.

In 1945 Auteco began importing American Indian motorcycles. It then went on to import Excelsior motorbikes, as well as vehicles produced by Nash, Renault and Gravely.

In 1954 Auteco acquired the right to assemble and sell Lambretta scooters in Colombia. These would later be assembled at a newly built factory in Itagüí, Antioquia, constructed in 1962. These scooters were all badged Auteco Lambretta. They were based at various times on the Li and GP ranges, as well as Servetas. Many were hybrids, depending on what components were currently available. Production ceased at some time during the 1970s.

In 1972 Auteco formed a business partnership with Kawasaki to build its motorcycles under licence. This was expanded in the economic downturn of the late 1980s to include electrical generators and mowers.

In the early 1990s Auteco formed an additional business partnership with the Indian Bajaj company and reintroduced scooters to Colombia. They also obtained a licence to sell the Bajaj auto rickshaw.

Further expansion took place in 2003 when Auteco began importing Taiwanese Kymco motorcycles.

== Models distributed by Auteco in 2010 ==
- Bajaj Auto rickshaw
- Bajaj Boxer CT 100
- Bajaj Caliber 115
- Bajaj Discover 135
- Bajaj Platina 100
- Bajaj Pulsar
- Bajaj XCD 125
- Kawasaki Ninja 650R
- Kawasaki KMX 125
- Kawasaki Versys
- Kawasaki ZX130
- Kawasaki Ninja 250R
- Kymco Activ 110
- Kymco Agility 125
- Kymco Agility RS 125
- Kymco Agility City 150
- Kymco Bet&Win 250

== See also ==
- List of motor scooter manufacturers and brands
