= Vectrix =

Vectrix electric scooter
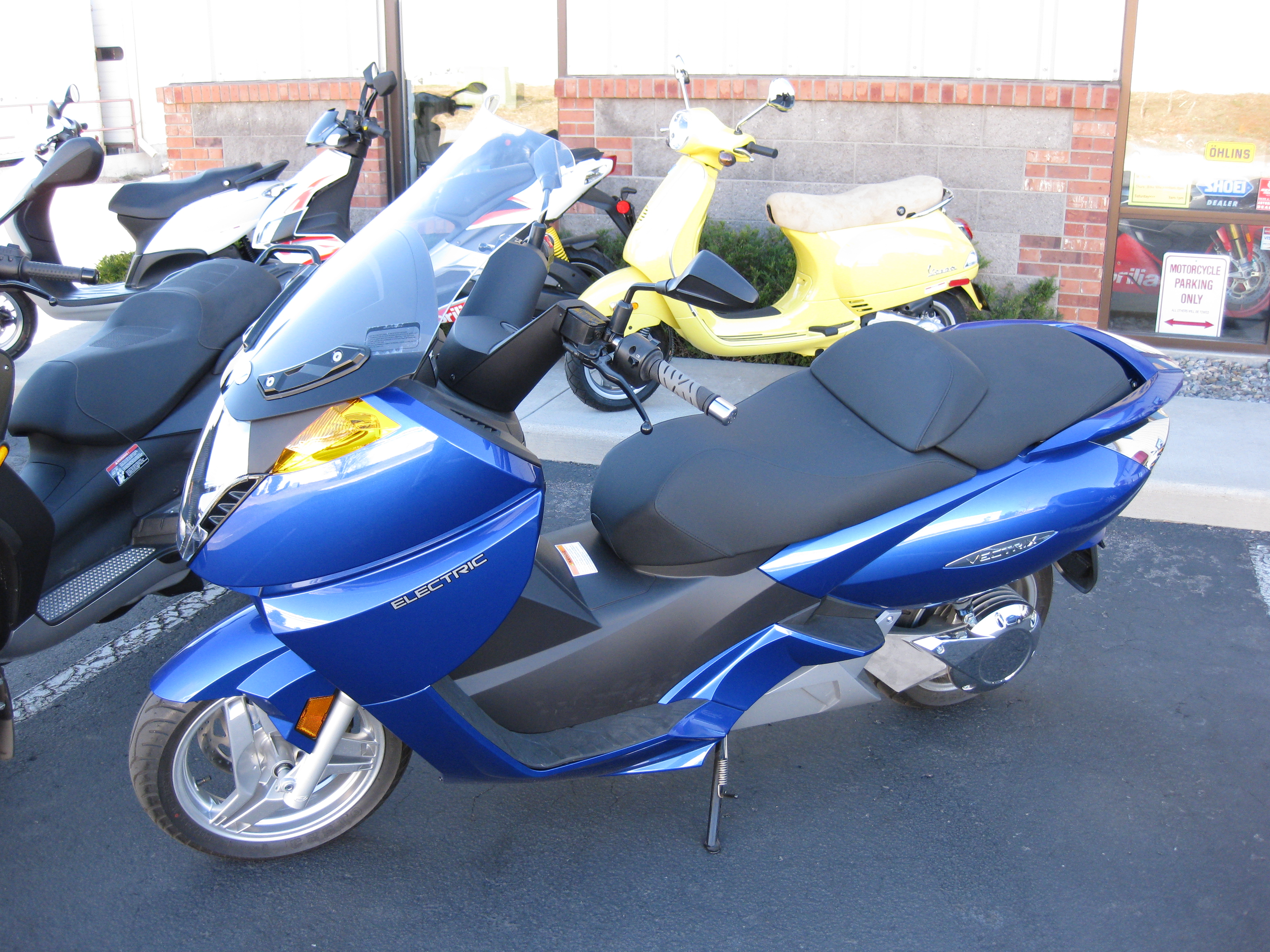
- Manufacturer: Vectrix
- Class: Electric scooter
- Engine: Brushless DC motor
- Top speed: 109 km/h (68 mph)
- Power: 20.2 kW (27.1 hp) peak; 7 kW (9.4 hp) continuous
- Torque: 65 N⋅m (48 lb⋅ft)
- Transmission: Rear wheel planetary gear drive
- Brakes: Front and rear Brembo disc
- Tires: Front: 120/70 14; Rear: 140/60 13
- Wheelbase: 1,525 mm (60.0 in)
- Seat height: 770 mm (30 in)
- Weight: 210 kg (460 lb) (dry)
- Fuel capacity: 3.7 kWh NiMH

Vectrix was an electric vehicle company based in Middletown, Rhode Island, United States, with research and development facilities in New Bedford, Massachusetts and an assembly plant in Wrocław, Poland.

== Scooters ==
Introduced in 2006, the Vectrix VX-1 was a maxi-size scooter, and was the first commercially available high-performance electric scooter. It was capable of over 60 mph (97 km/h), and 50 mph (80 km/h) was reached in a little under 7 seconds, with maximum torque available from zero rpm, a characteristic of electric motors. It has under 250 parts, compared with 2,500 for a conventionally powered scooter, and has a range of up to 65 miles (105 km) at 25 mph (40 km/h).

In the United Kingdom, Italy, the Netherlands and Slovenia, the Vectrix was exempt from paying road tax.

The Vectrix scooter uses NiMH batteries with a manufacturer-claimed life of 10 years and 1,500 recharges. The 125-volt battery pack has a capacity of 3.7 kW·h and can be recharged to 80% in two hours from a standard domestic power socket. The battery can also be partially recharged through regenerative braking. Replacement cost of the battery is estimated to be around $3,000, almost one third of the cost of the bike.

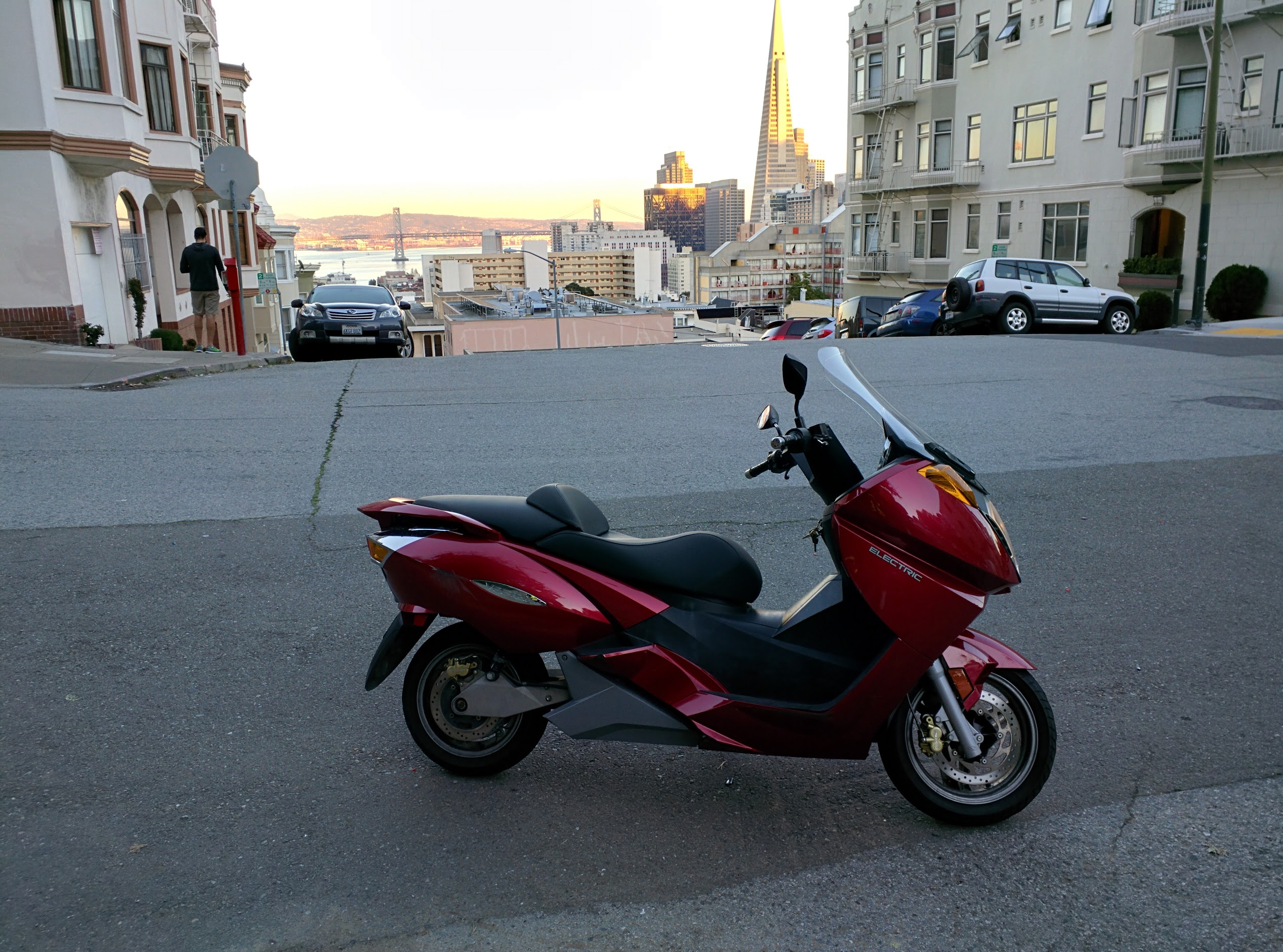
Red VX-1 in San Francisco, February 2016

In June 2008, Vectrix indicated that it planned to test lithium-ion battery packs based on lithium iron phosphate battery technology, in an agreement with GP Batteries International Limited of Hong Kong.

In the fall of 2008, Vectrix announced an expanded product line with two lower-priced bikes: The VX-1E was projected to arrive March 2009, with the VX-2 following in June 2009. Pre-production models of both bikes were shown at the New York International Motorcycle Show in January 2009 and also at Birmingham Motor Show, but they never entered production due to the company ceasing trading.

== Concept vehicles ==
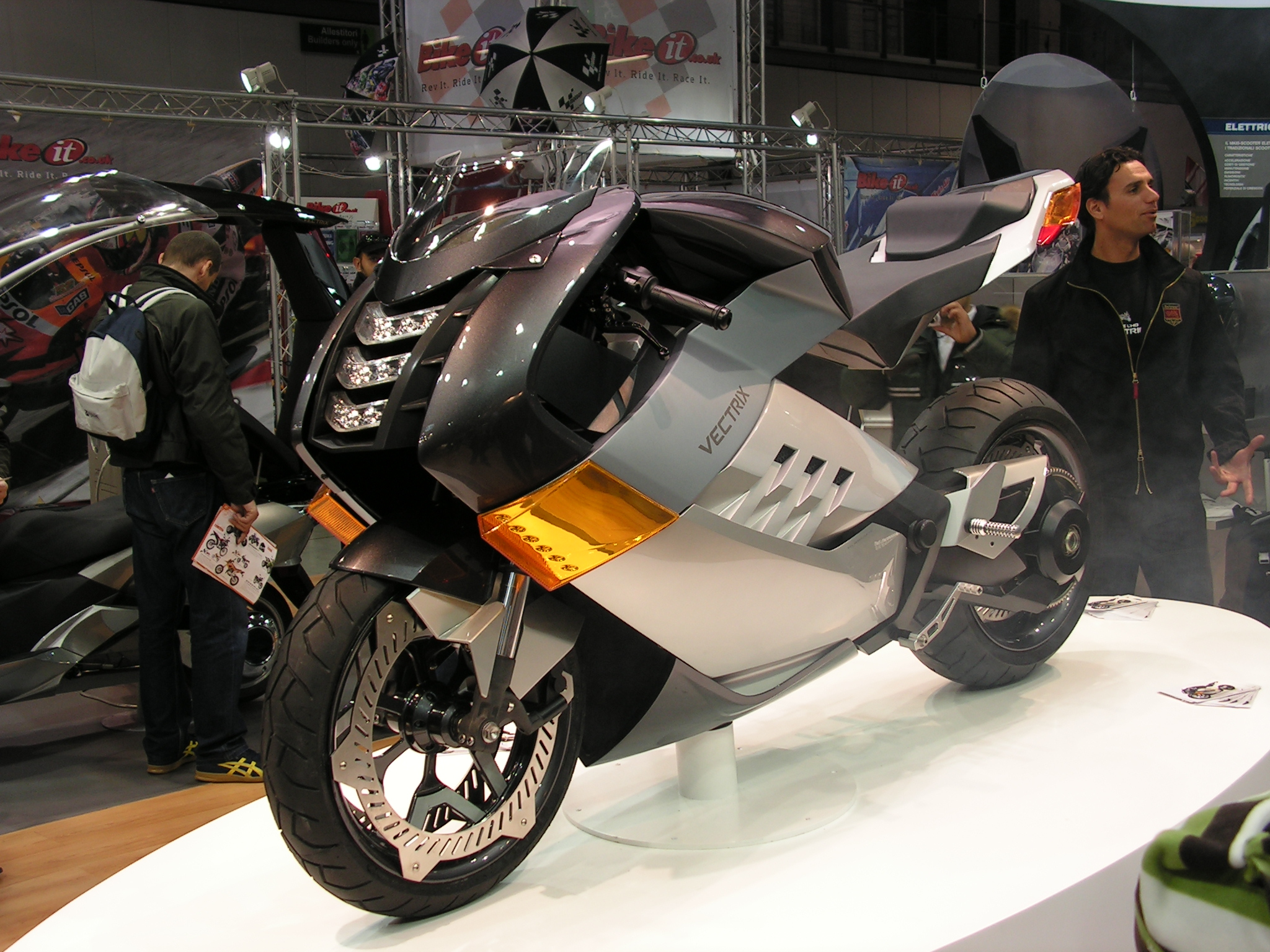
The electric superbike on display at the EICMA 2007 in Milan

Vectrix showed a 125 mph (201 km/h) superbike concept vehicle at the 2007 Milan motorcycle show, to be produced if 500 deposits were received. In 2012 New Vectrix (re)-unveiled the super bike prototype at the SWISS-MOTO 2012 show in Zürich, Switzerland, announcing that they are taking orders and may produce the bike with as little as 200 pre-orders. In 2008, Vectrix announced a 3-wheeled version of the Vectrix Maxi scooter.

== Testing by prospective users ==
The New York City Police Department announced in December 2007 that it would be testing vehicles from Vectrix with the goal of replacing its current gasoline-powered scooters.

The Government of Canada purchased a vehicle from Vectrix in August 2008 with the goal of testing and evaluating a fully electric motorcycle's energy consumption, range, and additional road testing parameters. This environmental initiative was part of Transport Canada's ecoTECHNOLOGY for Vehicles (eTV) program.

== New Vectrix ==
For much of 2010 the company rehired old and new staff and began supporting old owners with issues again. In 2011 Vectrix introduced the VX-2 and the VX-1 Li/Li+ into the product line showing at some shows and updated on their website. The VX-1 Li is the same as the original bike but using lithium batteries of 30-amp hour capacity, for similar range and performance in a lighter bike. The Li+ has a 42-amp hour capacity, giving greater range. The VX-2 is designed as a smaller, lighter and less expensive version of the original bike for those who don't need freeway speeds or the weight of the original. Though it has similar range to the original, its top speed is less than half, but so is the price. In 2012, Vectrix entered into a distribution agreement with Peirspeed to distribute Vectrix electric scooters in the U.S.

== Loss of European distributors ==
In October 2013, Vectrix lost its French distributor Italmotori after allegations of failing to ship scooters, batteries, and scooter parts required for repairs under warranty. In addition, in November 2013 a French automotive magazine after confirming that Italmotori was the third distributor (after Euromotor and Vectrix France) to cease representing Vectrix, reported that Vectrix appeared to be abandoning two models, its VX-1 and VX-3. A dealer in Portugal, Fuel Free Motors, asserts that they still will offer support for Vectrix scooters.

== Shutdown of US operations, final bankruptcy filing and liquidation ==
In January 2014 Vectrix ceased all US operations. After numerous manufacturing problems resulting in failed batteries and nonfunctioning scooters, Vectrix's parent company Gold Peak, a Chinese battery manufacturer, decided to close down Vectrix's US facilities. Vectrix intended to maintain its Poland fabrication plant in order to continue to supply parts for its joint venture with Daimler's Smart division.

In March 2014 Vectrix filed for bankruptcy again, this time under Chapter 7 for liquidation of the company. The court filings indicated assets of between $1 and $10 million and liabilities of between $10 and $50 million. The bankruptcy trustee announced an auction of the company's remaining assets, including unsold scooters, parts, and lithium batteries, to take place in June 2014.

== Vectrix US and PL assets acquisition ==
During the liquidation process the MPTECH group acquired the majority of the Vectrix US assets from the bankruptcy trustee and relocated them to Wrocław, Poland. Six months later, the entire assets of the Polish fabrication plant were acquired by MPTECH group and part of the heavy production equipment sold to GOVECS in order to expand their production capabilities. In June 2015, the MPTECH group restarted the production of the VX-1 and VX-2 models, equipping them with completely new battery and electronics, internally design and produced.

Since the restart of operations, the new Vectrix company has re-established part of the former distribution network, restored supplier network, restored the spare parts availability, and begun market expansion plans.
