= Vento (surname) =

Vento is a surname of Italian and Finnish origin.

Vento is surname for 803 Finns (2017). It can also refer to a character in old Finnish poetry. As a surname it can refer to:

- Jouni Vento (born 1966, artist name Martti Waris), Finnish musician in Eläkeläiset
- Jouni Vento (born 1966), Finnish ice hockey player
- Urpo Vento (1935–2020), former Secretary General of the Finnish Literature Society

Vento as a surname of Italian origin that may refer to:

- Bruce Vento (1940–2000), American politician
- Flavia Vento (born 1977), Italian model and actress
- Guillermo Vento (1921–20??), Venezuelan baseball player
- Joey Anthony Vento (1939–2011), American cook and restaurateur
- Jorge Pérez Vento (born 1947), Cuban former volleyball player
- María Vento-Kabchi (born 1974), Venezuelan tennis player
- Mike Vento (born 1978), American baseball player
- Sergio Vento (born 1938), Italian diplomat
- Marcus Perperna Vento (Perperna also spelled Perpenna and Vento also spelled Veiento, died 72 BC), a Roman aristocrat, statesman and general

== See also ==
- Vento (motorcycle manufacturer)
- Volkswagen Vento
