= Fenwick Groupe =

The Fenwick Groupe is a French engineering company, established in 1862, located in Saint-Ouen on the northern outskirts of Paris. Its headquarters are in Saint-Quentin-en-Yvelines.

== History ==
Fenwick was founded as an export company in 1862. Most of its trade was with the United States. A meeting in 1878 led to the import of American made hair clippers. These sold well and other imports such as bicycles, typewriters and lifting equipment followed.

In 1927, the French franc collapsed against the dollar making American goods prohibitively expensive. Consequently, Fenwick obtained a licence to build Yale forklift trucks in France and so diversified into manufacturing.

In 1951 Fenwick obtained a licence to manufacture Lambretta scooters in France. Approximately 200,000 of these were built by 870 employees at factory at Saint-Julien-les-Villas in Troyes. Production stopped in 1960 when demand fell.

At its peak in 1970, the company employed 1,150 staff at the Saint-Julien-les-Villas plant, which was also used to manufacture forklifts. The plant closed in 1984 with the loss of 515 jobs. The factory's forklift production was taken over by Linde and a new subsidiary called Fenwick-Linde was created.

== See also ==
- List of motor scooter manufacturers and brands
