= Bajaj Priya =

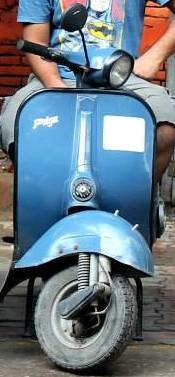
- Manufacturer: Bajaj Auto
- Predecessor: Bajaj 150
- Successor: Super Fe
- Class: Scooter
- Engine: 150cc
- Bore / stroke: 57/57
- Compression ratio: 7.4:1
- Top speed: 80
- Power: 6.3 bhp
- Torque: 1kgm
- Transmission: 3-speed
- Frame type: monocoque
- Brakes: drum rear and front
- Tires: 3.50-8
- Dimensions: H: 1015 mm
- Weight: 91 kg (dry)
- Fuel capacity: 6.5 L
- Fuel consumption: 45 km/L

The Bajaj Priya is a three-speed, 150cc scooter that was manufactured in Pune, India for Maharashtra Scooters from 1975 until April 1992 under a license agreement with Bajaj Auto Limited. The design was very similar to that of the earlier "Bajaj 150" model, which was in turn based upon a Vespa 150 (VBA type) with a slightly modified body.

== Differences from other models ==
=== Headset ===
Unlike the earlier Vespa and Bajaj 150 models, which used fully enclosed headsets, the Priya shared a headset with the more common Vespa Super, but was fitted with a round "volcano" style speedometer found on other Bajaj Scooters. The headset, which featured a non-enclosed bottom for easy access to cables, also had an integrated switch section, unlike the earlier Bajaj and Vespa 150, where it was joined separately and made of polished aluminum.

=== Horncast ===
Unlike the earlier Vespa and Bajaj 150 models, which usually sported the original Italian-style horncast with the older rectangular Piaggio monogram, the Priya used an angular horncast with a hexagonal Bajaj monogram similar to Vespa models produced in the early to mid 1970s.

=== Tail lamp ===
Unlike the earliest Indian-built Vespa 150s, which used the same aluminium tail lamps as the Italian-built Vespa VBA/GS150 design, the Priya came with a chrome plated Vespa Sprint type taillight.

== See also ==
- List of motor scooter manufacturers and brands
