= Scarabeo =

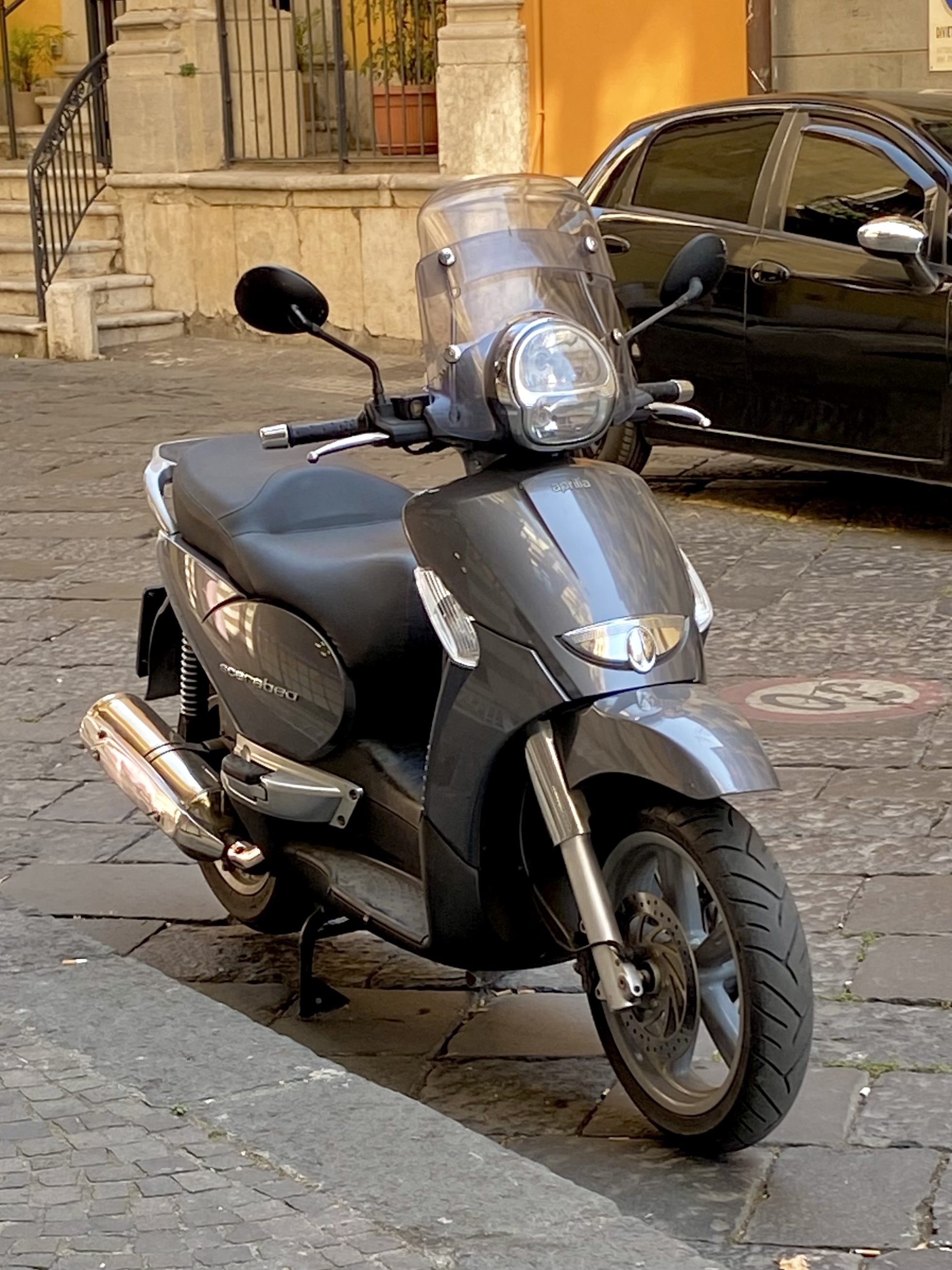
- Manufacturer: Aprilia
- Parent company: Piaggio
- Production: 1993-2020
- Class: Scooter

The Scarabeo is a scooter model produced by the Italian motorcycle manufacturer Aprilia. Available in different displacements, it was first presented to the public in 1993.

Initially born as a model within the Aprilia range, today Scarabeo is a brand in its own right, always part of the Piaggio group.

== History ==
The first vehicle under the name Scarabeo was produced by Aprilia in January 1970 and is a 50 cm^{3} cross scooter. The name derives from the Egyptian culture. The Scarabeo becomes the progenitor of a series of off-road vehicles with numerous engines, which were produced until 1974.

The title of the research that, in 1990, gave birth to the high wheel scooter is “Study for a City Bike”; the first sketch presents the central tunnel, the large section wheel, a single-sided front fork.

From the pencil of Giuseppe Ricciuti, designer of all the Scarabeo, two projects are born: the first derives from an intermediate version of the original city bike (traditional suspensions, lower section wheels and central tunnel); the second, more slender, loses the tunnel and provides wheels with a smaller section and larger diameter. On May 18, 1992, the maquette from which the definitive Scarabeo will be born was presented. At this point, an engineering work begins that will keep the technical team busy for about a year: Scarabeo is the first Aprilia vehicle on which computers have been extensively used in technical development.

In the panorama of motorcycles of the period, the Scarabeo tried to combine the protection of the fairings typical of scooters with "high" wheels, that is, of classic dimensions rather than the more common reduced ones.

The official presentation took place in September 1993 at EICMA. Between 1994 and 1998, some technical innovations are introduced such as the disc brake. In 1999, the 125 and 150 displacements presented in Lisbon were born.

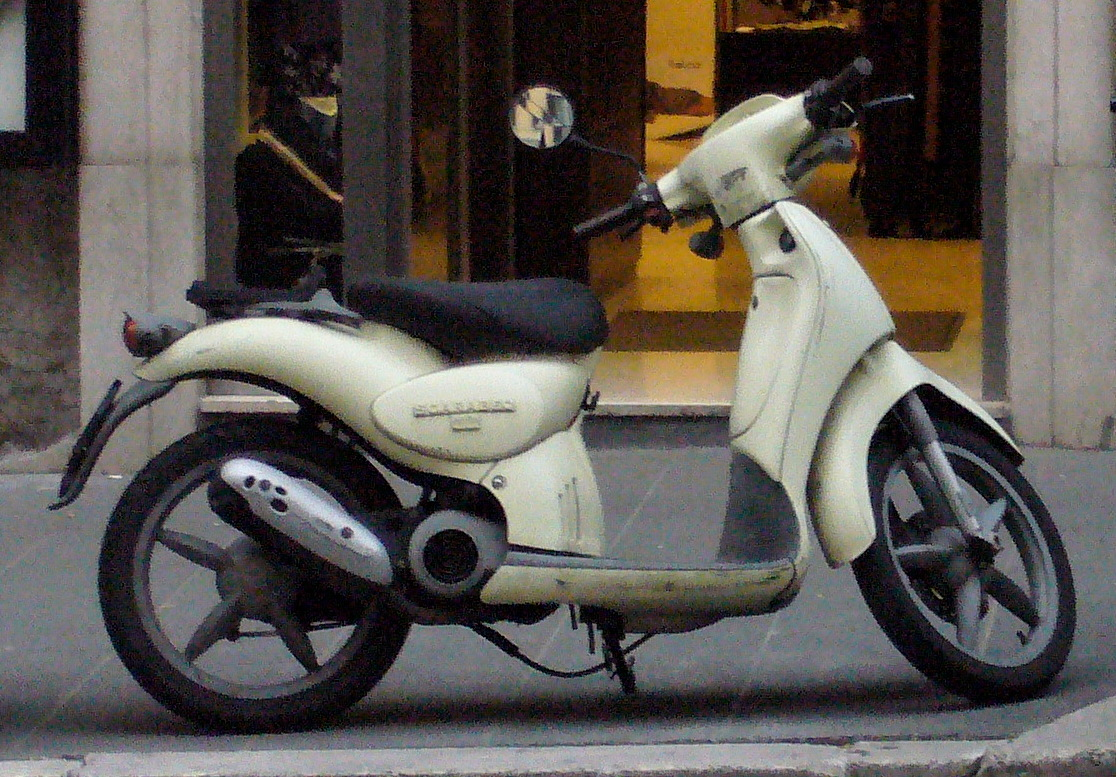
Scarabeo 50

The 50 and 100 engines use the same body, which is smaller, lighter and more agile. A larger version is intended for the 150 (discontinued) 125 and 200 displacements (renewed in early 2009), while a third version is intended for the 250, 300, 400 and 500 displacements. respectful of Euro 3 anti-pollution standards.

In 2001, the 50 displacement underwent an initial restyling and was equipped with a two-stroke DiTech engine (first generation direct injection for mopeds), also present on another Aprilia scooter, the sporty SR.

The 125, 150 and 200 engines, produced by Rotax up to the 2001 model and which differed only in the size of the engine, were replaced by the Piaggio models that equip the Vespa GTs, in the 125 and 200 displacements. All engines are four liquid-cooled times (excluding the 50, both two and four-stroke, air-cooled), equipped with carburetor up to 200 and electronic injection for the 250, 300, 400 (discontinued) and 500 engines.

In 2002, the GT version of the Scarabeo 125/200 was born. In 2003, ten years after the birth of the Scarabeo, the Scarabeo 500 was presented, a scooter plus Gran Turismo, since 2004 also in a version with ABS. In 2005, Scarabeo celebrates 250,000 registered units. A new 50 cm^{3} graphic version is also born, called "Graphic". In 2006, the "Street" versions were born with 125 and 200 displacements, and the new 500 arrived, while in 2007, the 250 i.e. version was launched and the new Scarabeo 125/200 arrived.

== See also ==
- List of motor scooter manufacturers and brands
