= Unu (company) =

German manufacturer of electric scooters

unu GmbH
- Company type: public company
- Industry: Scooters
- Founded: 2013
- Headquarters: Berlin, Germany
- Number of employees: 75
- Website: www.unumotors.com/en

Unu (commonly: unu) is a German manufacturer of electric scooters based in Berlin. In 2014, the company began offering three engine sizes. The vehicles are assembled in China and distributed in Germany, Austria, Switzerland, France and Netherlands.

== History ==
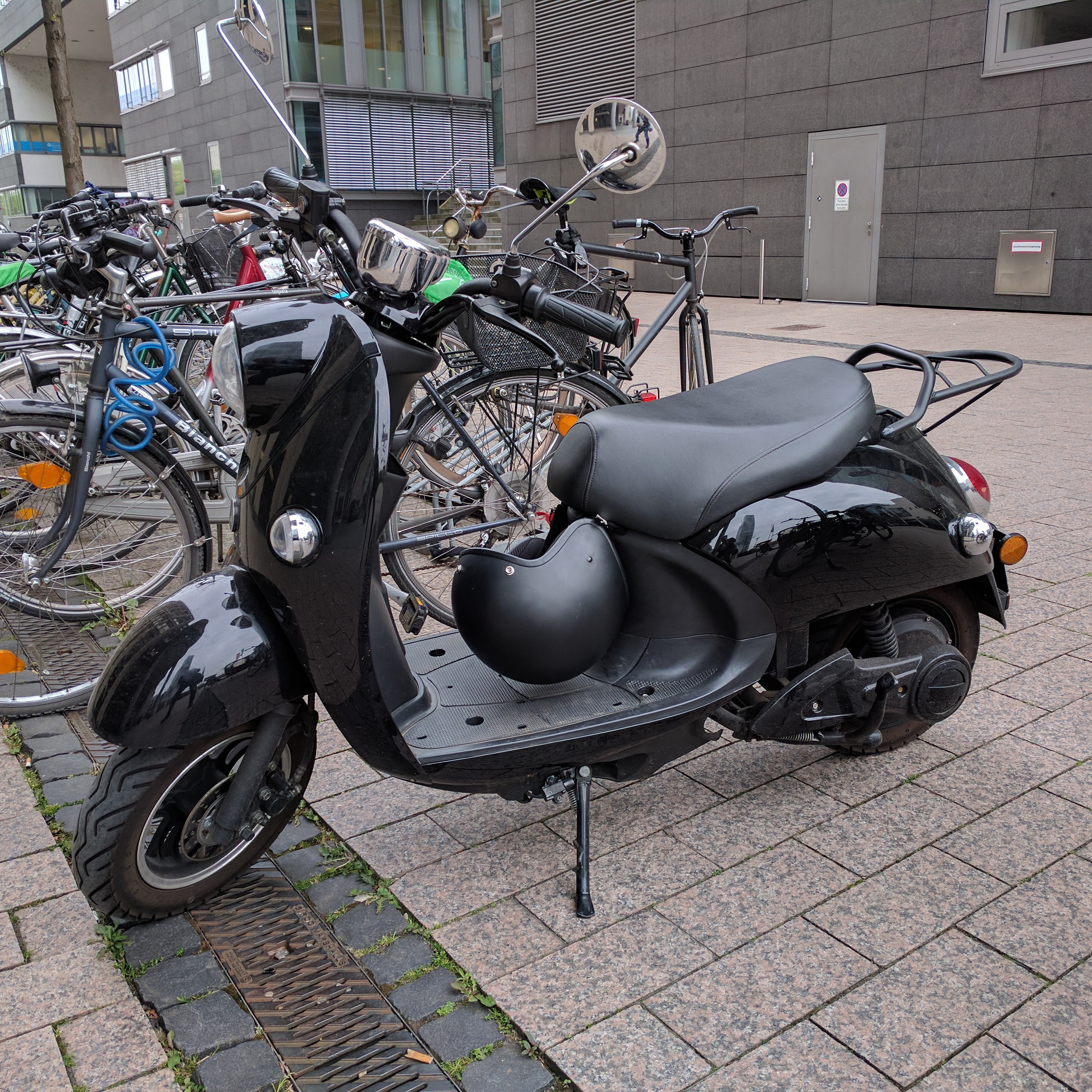
The 3kW unu Roller, in Shiny Black

The company's co-founder, Pascal Blum, used an electric scooter during his stay (2012) in China and then came up with the idea of marketing such vehicles in Germany. Together with co-founder Elias Atahi, Blum founded the company in 2013 with the support of the Technical University of Munich. The company name refers to the term for "one" in Esperanto.

== Design ==
The electric drive motor is located in the rear wheel and can be configured with either 1kW, 2 kW or 3 kW engine. All three engines offer less than 4 kW power and a maximum speed of 45 km/h, putting the scooter in the EC vehicle class L1e (a moped). The vehicle can actively recharge the battery during braking. In 2020, company introduced a new model featuring Bosch hub motor mounted in the rear singled-sided swingarm and removable batteries made by LG. The 1.7 kWh and 10 kg (22 lb) batteries are rated for 50 km (31 mi) of range each. With space for two batteries, the electric scooter has a maximum range of 100 km (62 mi) with 3.4 kWh of battery capacity. The seat has been redesigned to fit two riders.

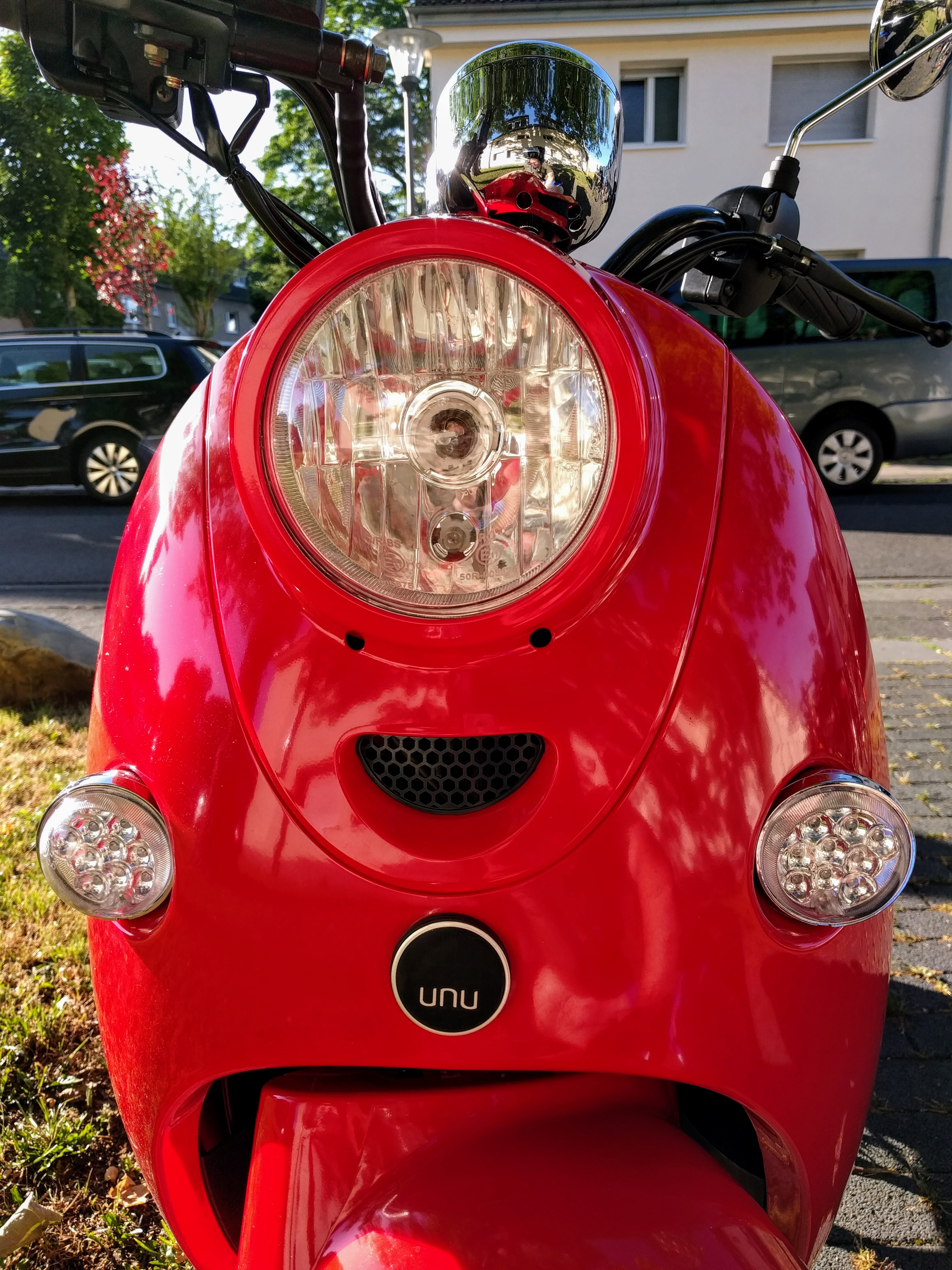
Front view

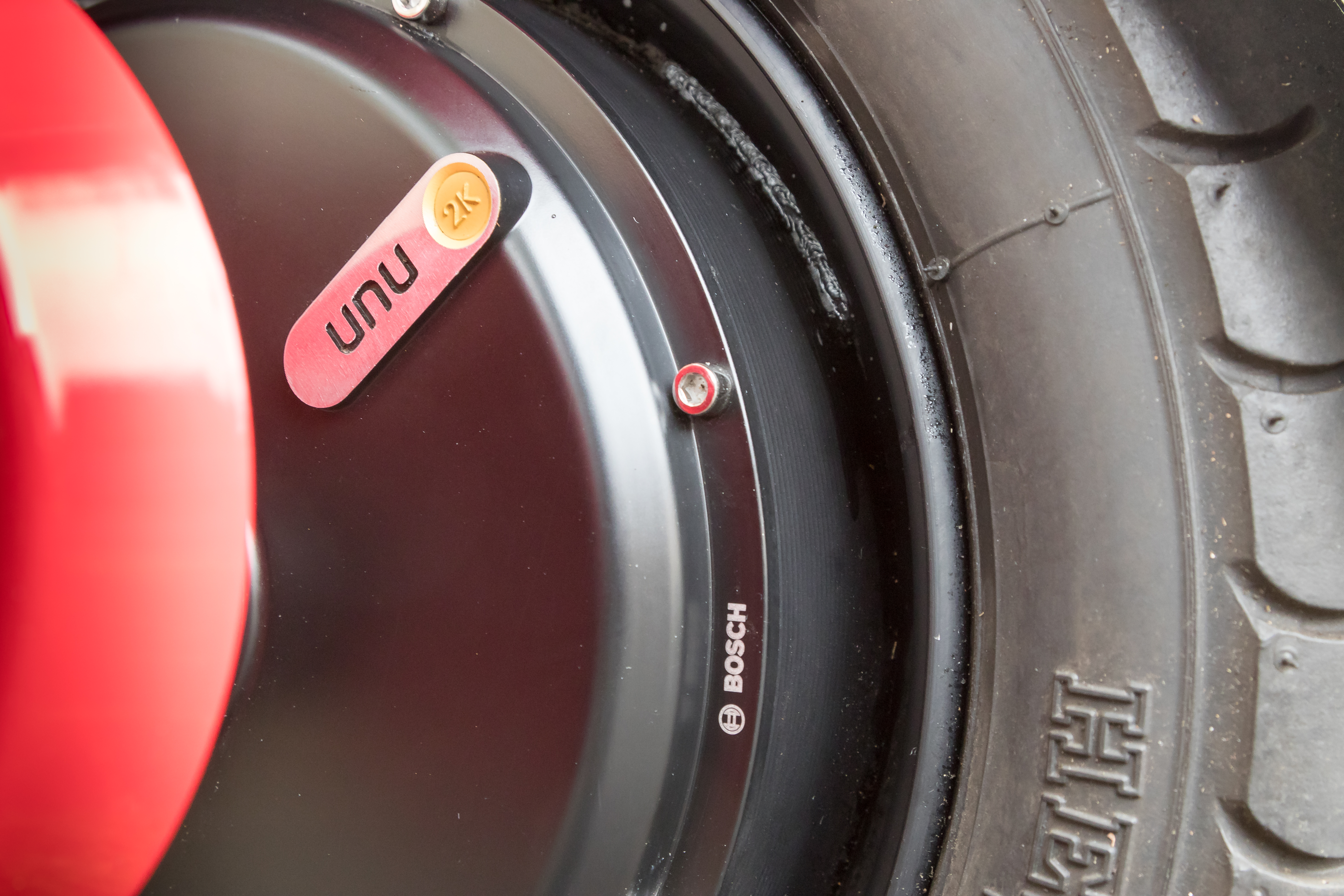
Bosch motor with 2 kW engine, 2017 model

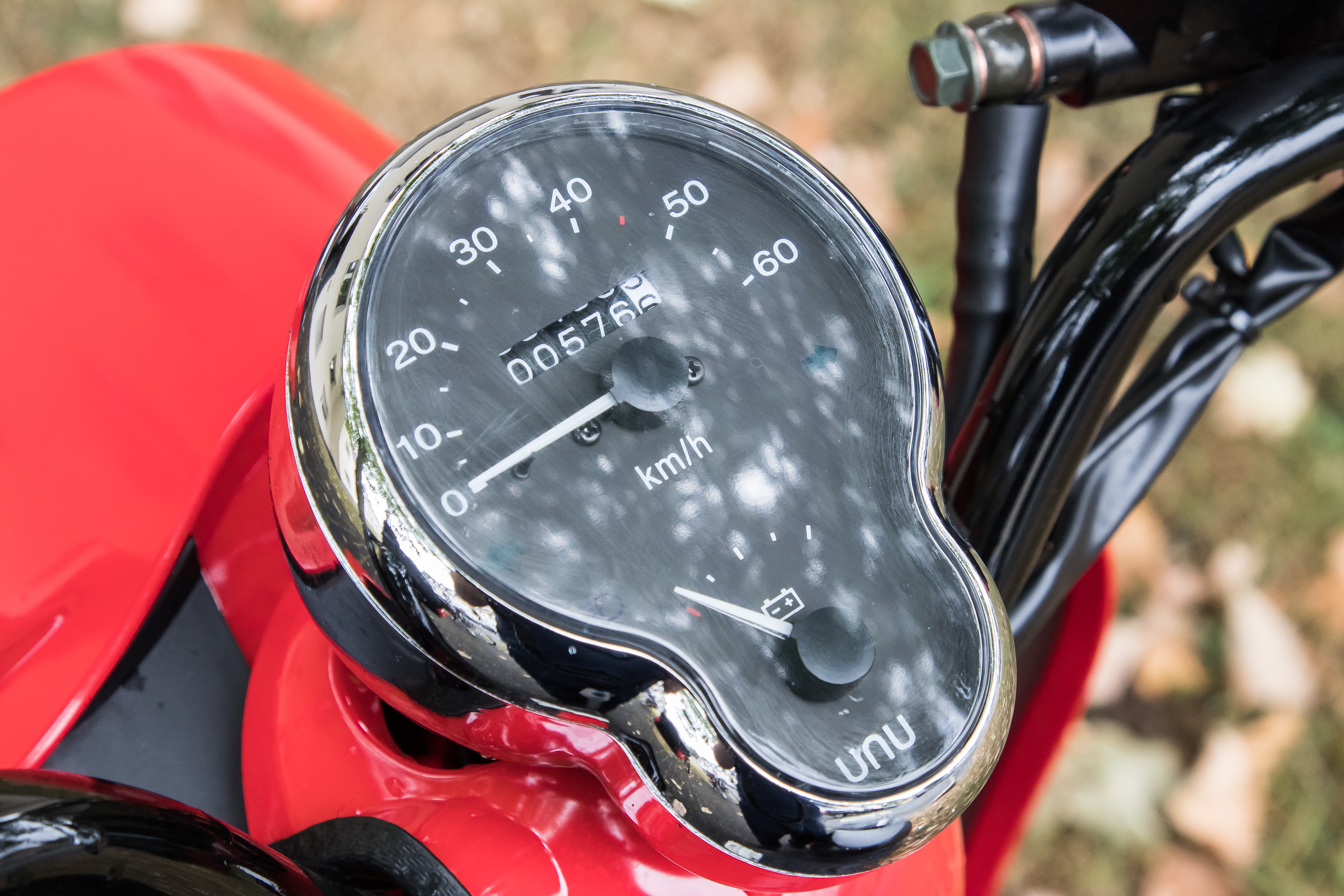
Instrument gauge with speedometer and battery charge

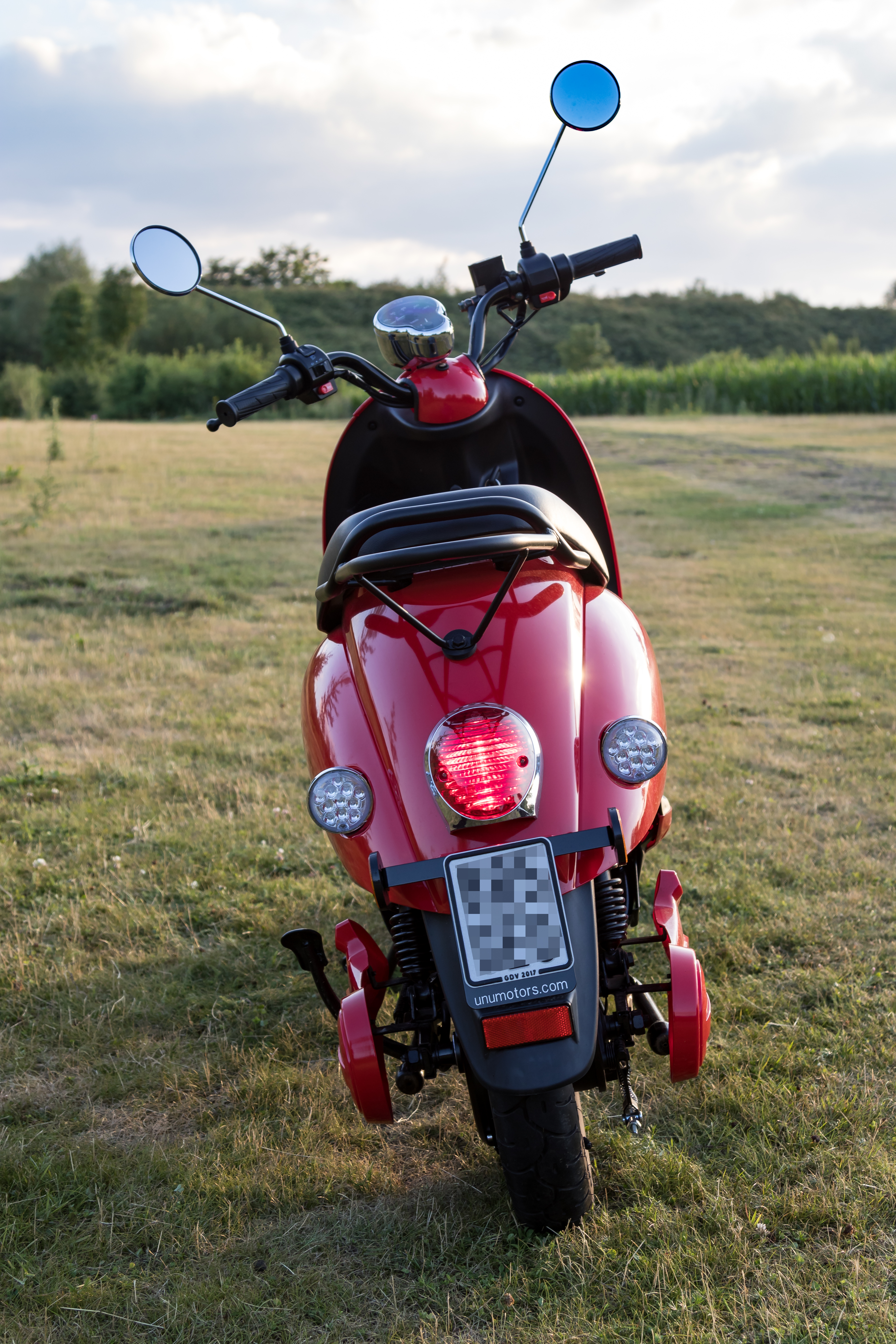
Rear view

== Market ==
The unu-scooter is custom made on-demand for each customer, assembled in China and delivered to the customer a few weeks later. The scooters are sold on the Internet after customers arrange a viewing or test drive with a company representative. Only areas where partner workshops are located are able to order the scooter. This allows for convenient servicing.

After its introduction in Germany, sales were extended to Austria, Switzerland, and in 2016 to the Netherlands, where the scooter is also offered in a 25 km/h version, which, in the Netherlands, allows the rider to drive without a helmet and on bike paths.

== See also ==
- List of scooter manufacturers
