= Čezeta =

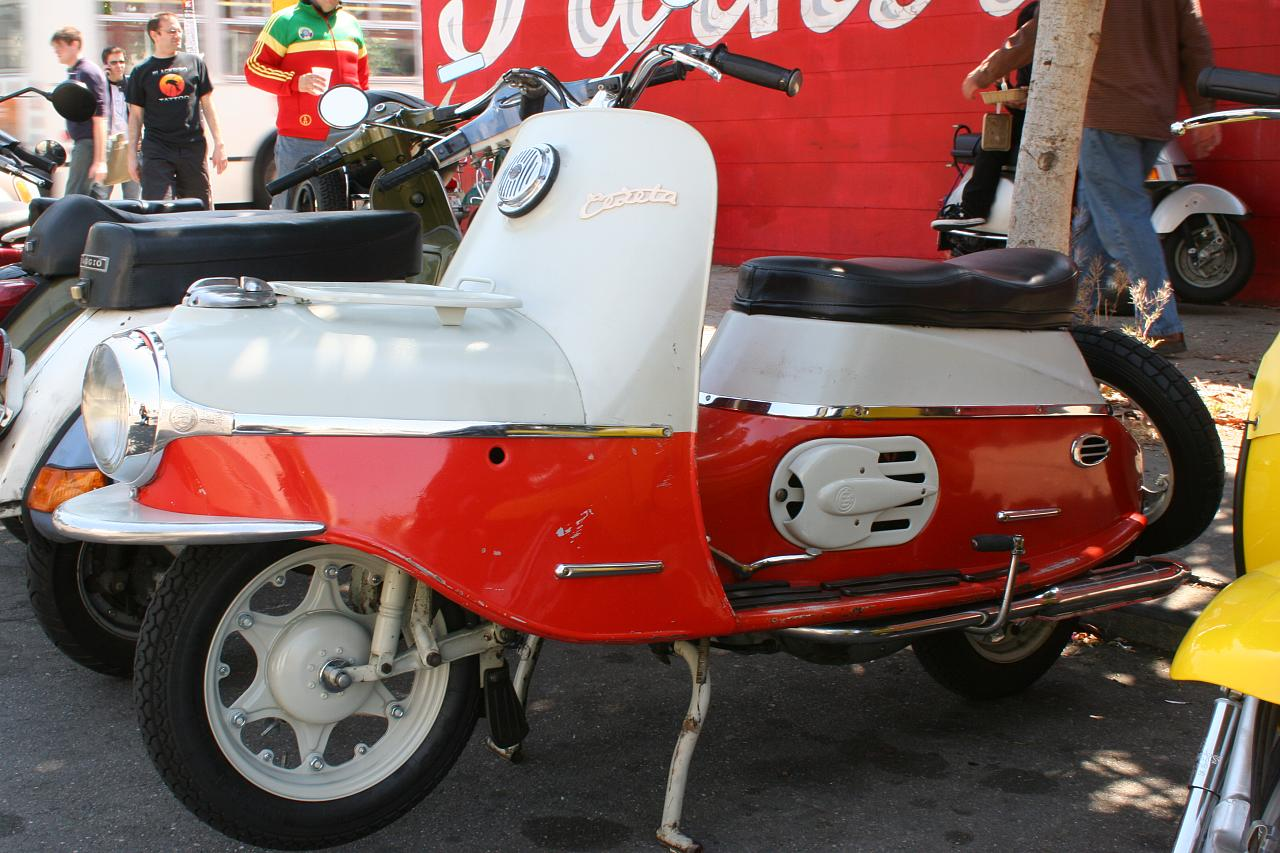
- Čezeta 501
- Manufacturer: Česká zbrojovka Strakonice
- Production: 1957

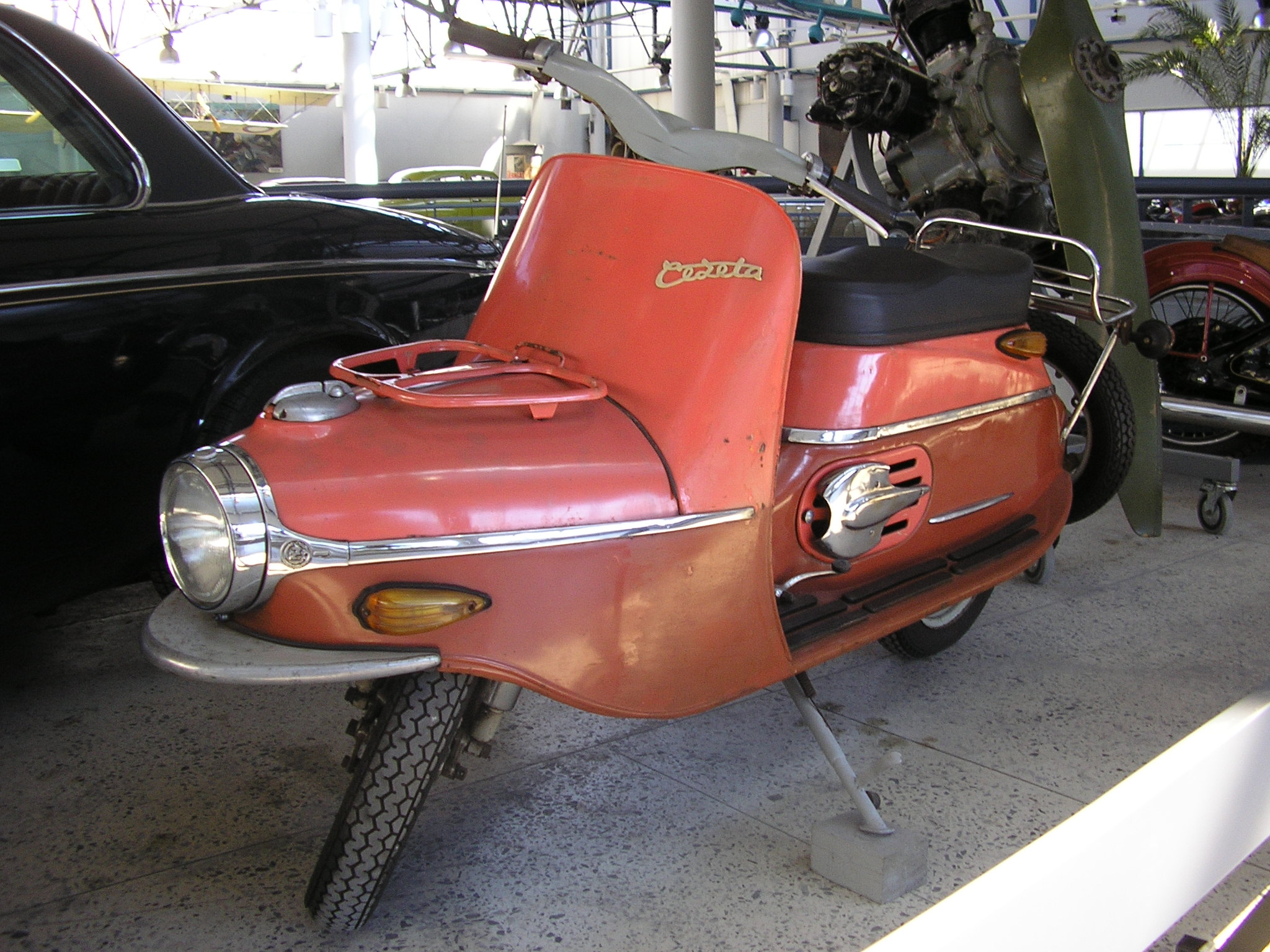
A Čezeta 502 (1960)

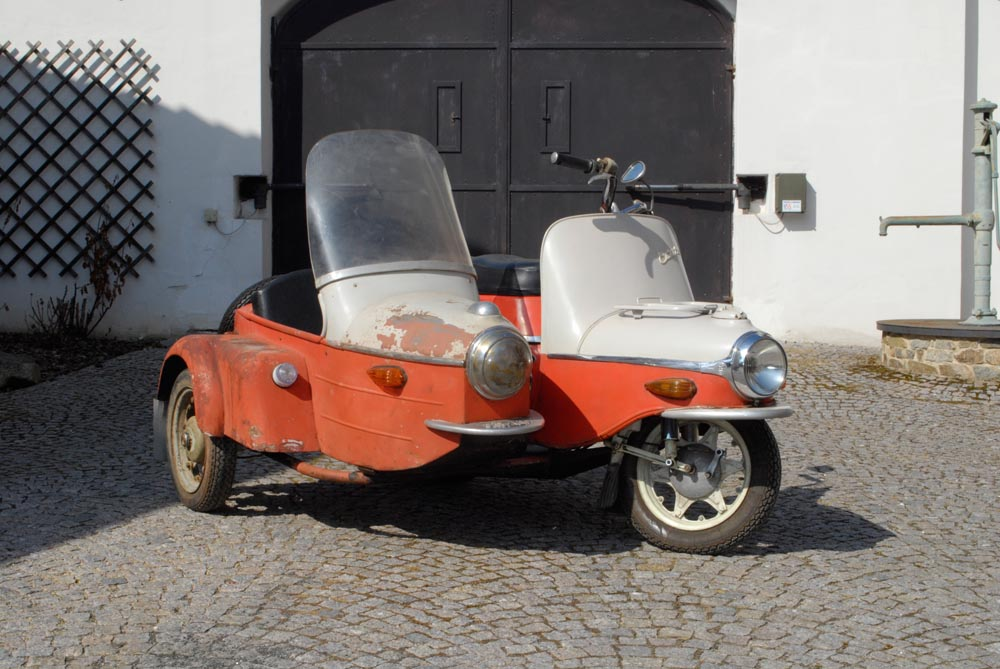
Čezeta 502 with Druzeta sidecar

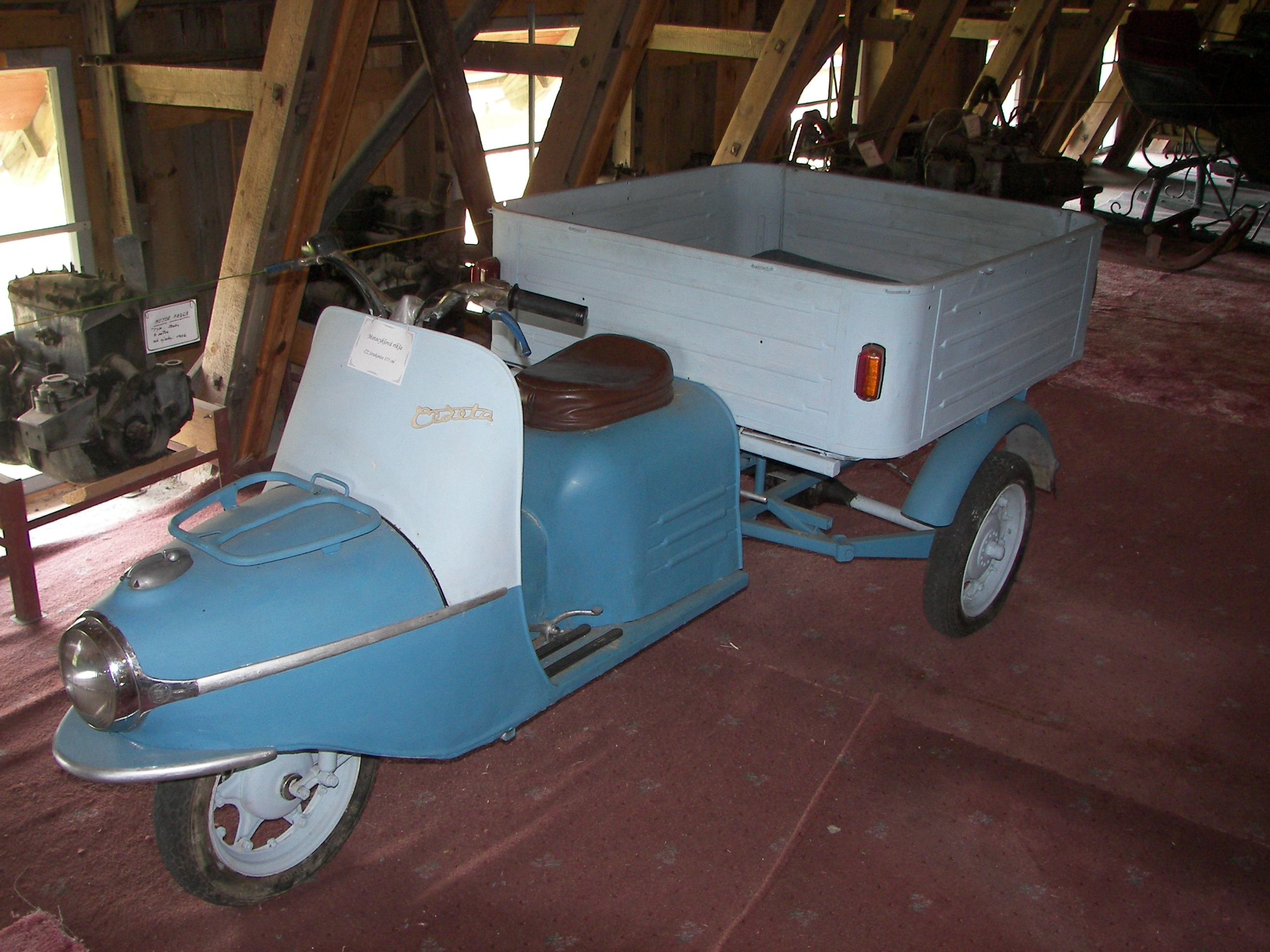
A Čezeta 505

The Čezeta is a motor scooter originally manufactured from 1957 to 1964 in Czechoslovakia and then in the Czech Republic by the Česká zbrojovka Strakonice (ČZ) company, which manufactured motorcycles from 1935 to 1997.

Production resumed in 2017 with the introduction of a limited-edition electric-powered Type 506.

== Types 501, 502 and 505 ==
The original design of the Čezeta is unique amongst scooters. It is unusually long for a two-wheeled vehicle at 2 metres (6 ft 7 in) and has a distinctive torpedo-shaped body with full-length running boards and a long seat that lifted to reveal a substantial luggage compartment, using space that in most scooters is occupied by the fuel tank. This made the Čezeta ideal for two people and popular with young Czechs and their lovers. The front mudguard is fixed to the body and fully streamlined into the leg shields. The fuel tank is positioned above the front wheel, with the headlight fitted into a recess and a luggage rack on the flat top surface.

The scooter was originally powered by the 175 cc ČZ two-stroke single-cylinder motorcycle engine, giving a top speed of 89 kilometres per hour (55 mph) and fuel economy of 3.2 litres/100 km. The engine was modified for the enclosed scooter by having a drive pulley on the crankshaft driving a fan by means of a Vee belt. There were four foot-operated gears.

The original petrol versions were given type numbers that indicate their features. The first production started with Type 501, then with advancements like a starter motor the Type 502 was later released. The 501 model, built from 1957 to 1959, had the rear wheel supported on one side only and suspended by a rubber block. The later 502 model had a full fork with motorcycle shock absorbers. These types contain sub-types to further indicate their features, for example Type 502/00 is a 12V model with electric starter, and a Type 502/01 is a 6V model with foot-crank starting.

A three-wheeled utility version, the Type 505 (or 'rickshaw'), was built starting in 1960. This vehicle used mechanical components and front bodywork from the 502.

A popular sidecar was also produced, though in limited numbers – approximately 900 in total – by Drupol in Stiřín near Prague. This was sold as the 'Druzeta', the name coming as a combination of the two companies' names.

== N-Zeta ==
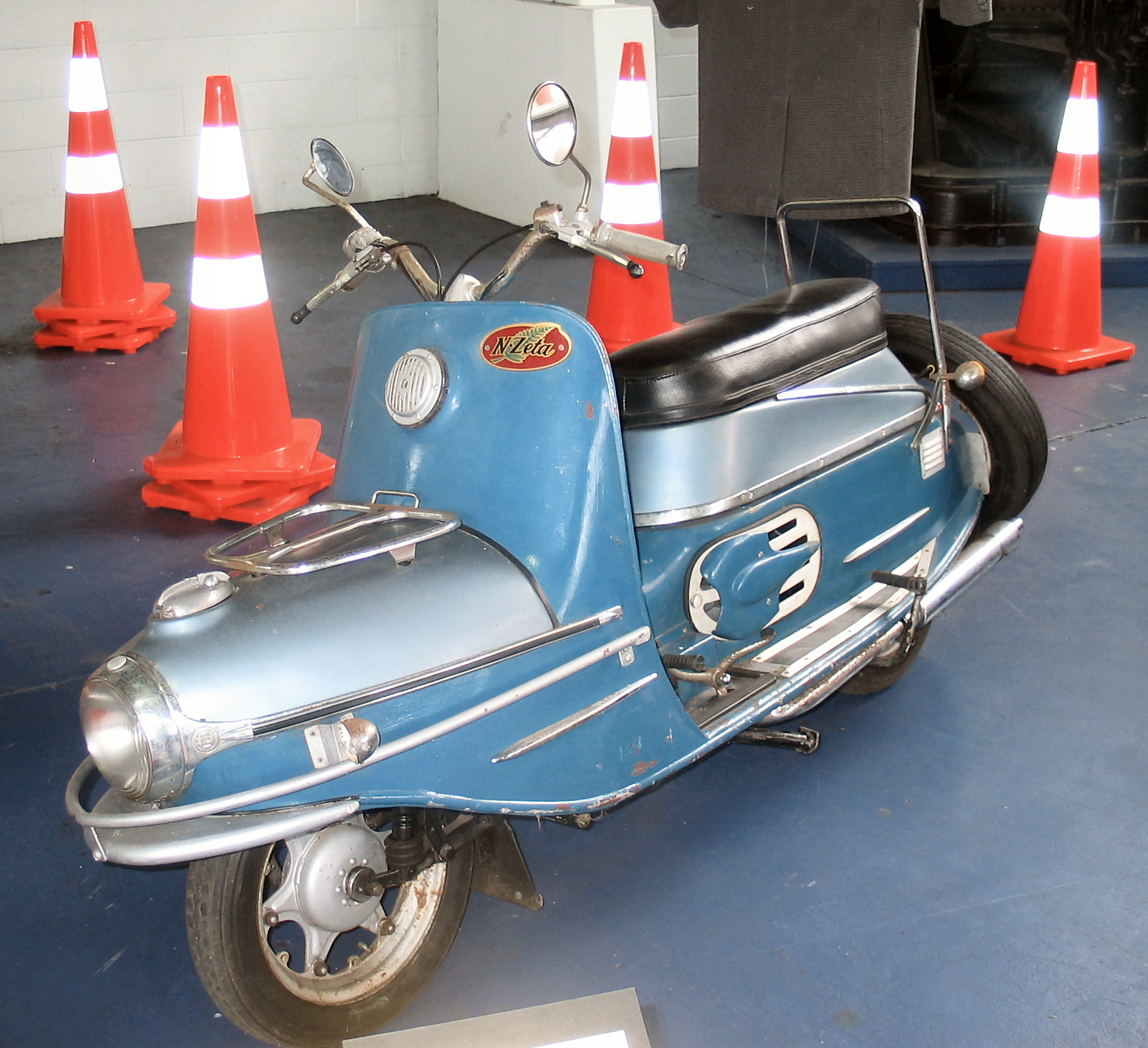
A New Zealand assembled N-Zeta scooter

In New Zealand a local company, JNZ Manufacturing Ltd assembled the 'Čezeta' under the name 'N-Zeta'. The point of New Zealand production was to avoid the duties placed on imported motor vehicles. Duty could be minimised by assembling locally, and using New Zealand parts wherever possible. The company apparently achieved 25% New Zealand manufacture by value, with tyres, seat, trim, lights, controls etc. and produced 4,000 scooters during the early 1960s.

== Type 506 ==
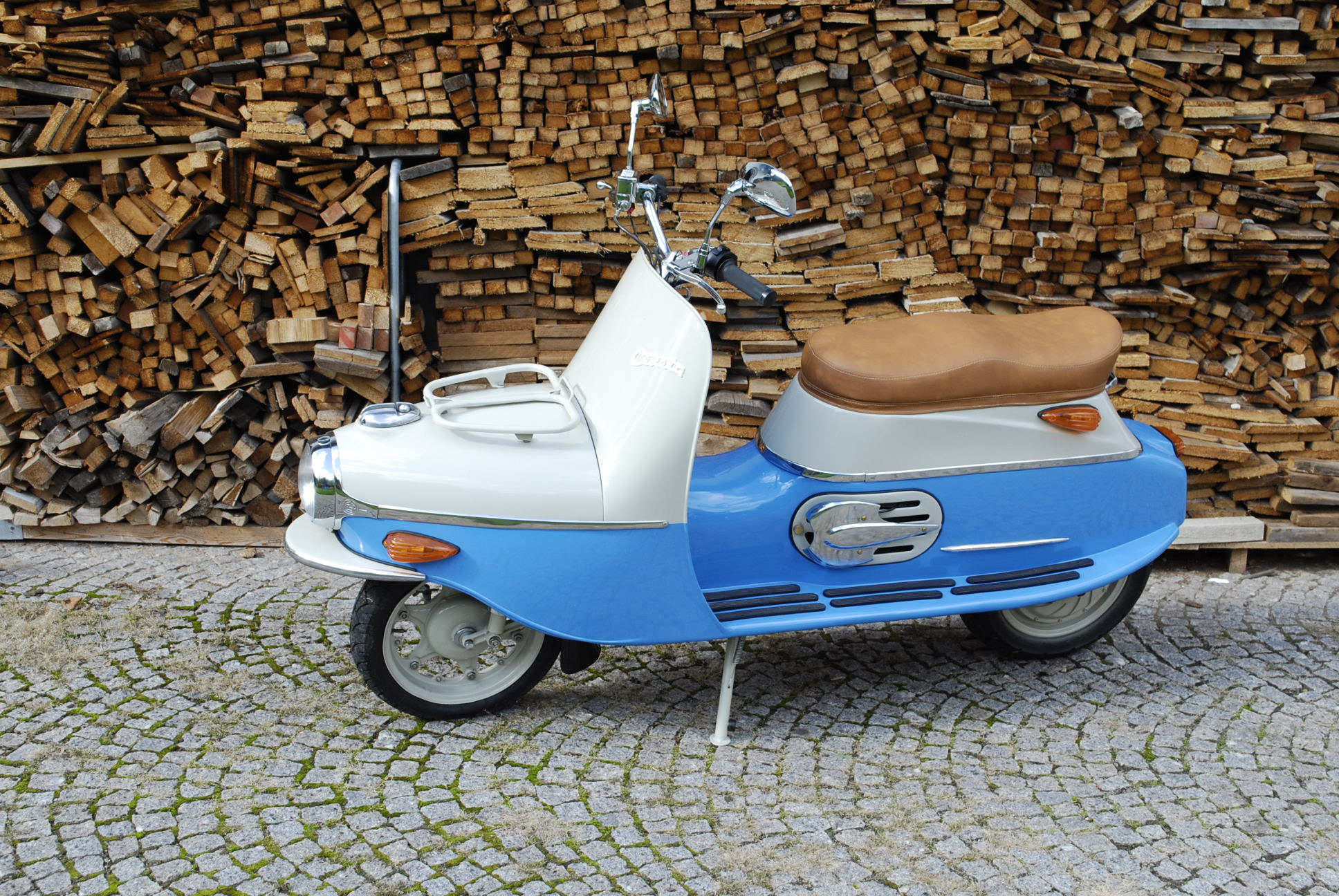
Čezeta 506 prototype (2015)

The Czech company Čezeta Motors s.r.o. was launched in 2013 for the development of an electric Čezeta – called the 'Type 506' – by British expat Neil Eamonn Smith. He stated the company's mission was to "build the world's most desirable scooter".

The Type 506 was developed from 2013 to 2017. The bike was constructed with a steel and aluminium frame and composite bodyshell to save weight. Local engineering companies and the Czech Technical University in Prague partnered with Čezeta to develop advanced technologies for the throttles, battery, and ECU-CAN system.

The final production scooter honoured the original design and sported up to 11 kW power and a 8.5kWh Panasonic battery to give it the highest speed (120 km/h (75 mph)) and longest range (200 km (120 mi)) of any A1 scooter in the world.

Pre-orders began in March 2017, the 60th anniversary of Čezeta. On 15 September 2017, the Czech Ministry of Transport confirmed the homologation of the Type 506 as the country's first serial-production electric vehicle. Production began in April 2018 in Prostějov in the historic Wikov factory. It was planned to make 60 of the Type 506, making it one of the world's rarest production electric scooter.

In Summer 2018 the company completed a crowdfunding campaigns, raising 20m Czech Koruna (approx 800,000 euro) in 10 days. These funds financed the launching of the Type 506 and the manufacturing of 60 scooters.

In October 2020, the company was offered for sale. Smith stated he had been convinced by the company's co-owners that it would be in the best interests of the company to sell the 506 project.

Records in the Czech Company Register show an Annual General Meeting on 27 August 2020 and an Extraordinary General Meeting on 15 December 2020 failed to find agreement between Smith and the crowdfunding co-owners on plans for the company. Consequently, on 9 February 2021 the company entered insolvency and after failing to find a buyer or new funding, the company finally ended in bankruptcy on 29 July 2022. Smith stated that the company had over 1 million euros of potential orders at the time of its liquidation.

Smith has continued building motorcycle projects under his DEVS brand. He stated plans to launch a new Čezeta Type 507 scooter and a new motorcycle.

== See also ==
- List of motor scooter manufacturers and brands
- List of motorcycles by type of engine
