= Baotian Motorcycle Company =

Chinese motorcycle manufacturer

- Industry: Motorcycles and scooters
- Founded: 1994; 32 years ago
- Headquarters: Jiangmen, Guangdong, China
- Website: baotianmotor.com

Baotian Motorcycle Industrial Co. Ltd, or Jiangmen Sino-HongKong Baotian Motorcycle Industrial Co. Ltd., established in 1994, is a Chinese manufacturer of motorcycles and scooters. Baotian tuning is very popular in Finland.

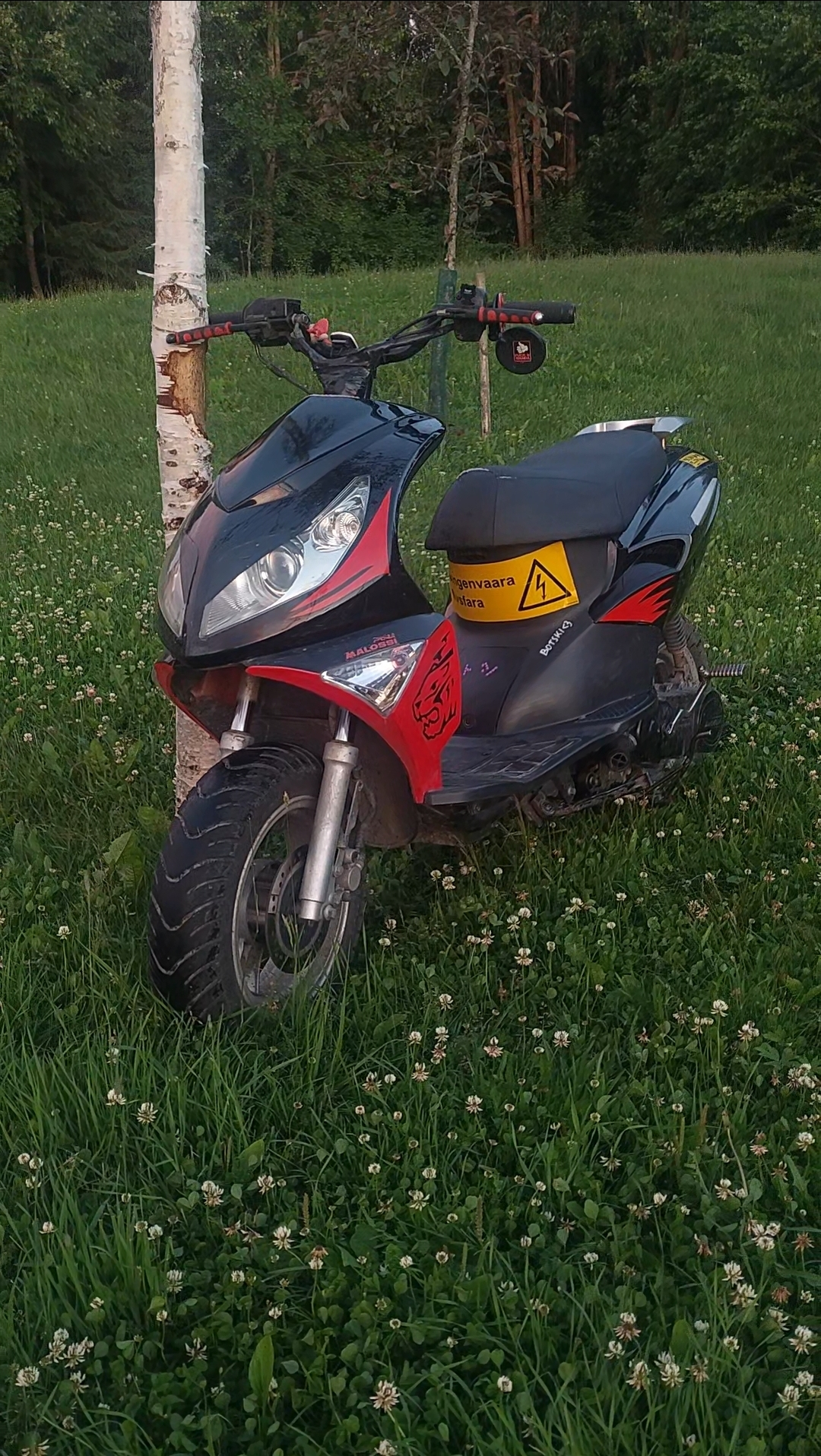
Example of tuned Baotian with 72cc cylinder in Finland

Baotian UK has been operating since 2005 and has consistently topped the 50cc scooter sales chart. In January 2007, according to industry statistics, the Baotian BT49QT-9 was third best-selling two-wheeler.

Sole distribution of the brand was granted to Baotian UK in October 2007 and the brand is now distributed widely via a network of motorcycle and scooter dealers.

== Models ==
- Baotian BT49QT-9
- Baotian BT49QT-11
- Baotian BT49QT-12 Rebel
- Baotian BT49QT-12 Rocky
- Baotian BT49QT-28A-13 Diablo 50cc twostroke with 1E40QMA engine (clone of the horizontal Minarelli 50cc)
- Baotian Eagle 50
- Baotian Falcon 50
- Baotian Tanco 125
- Baotian Citibike 125
- Baotian Tiger 50
- Baotian Flash 50
- Baotian andrejn.7
