= TN'G =

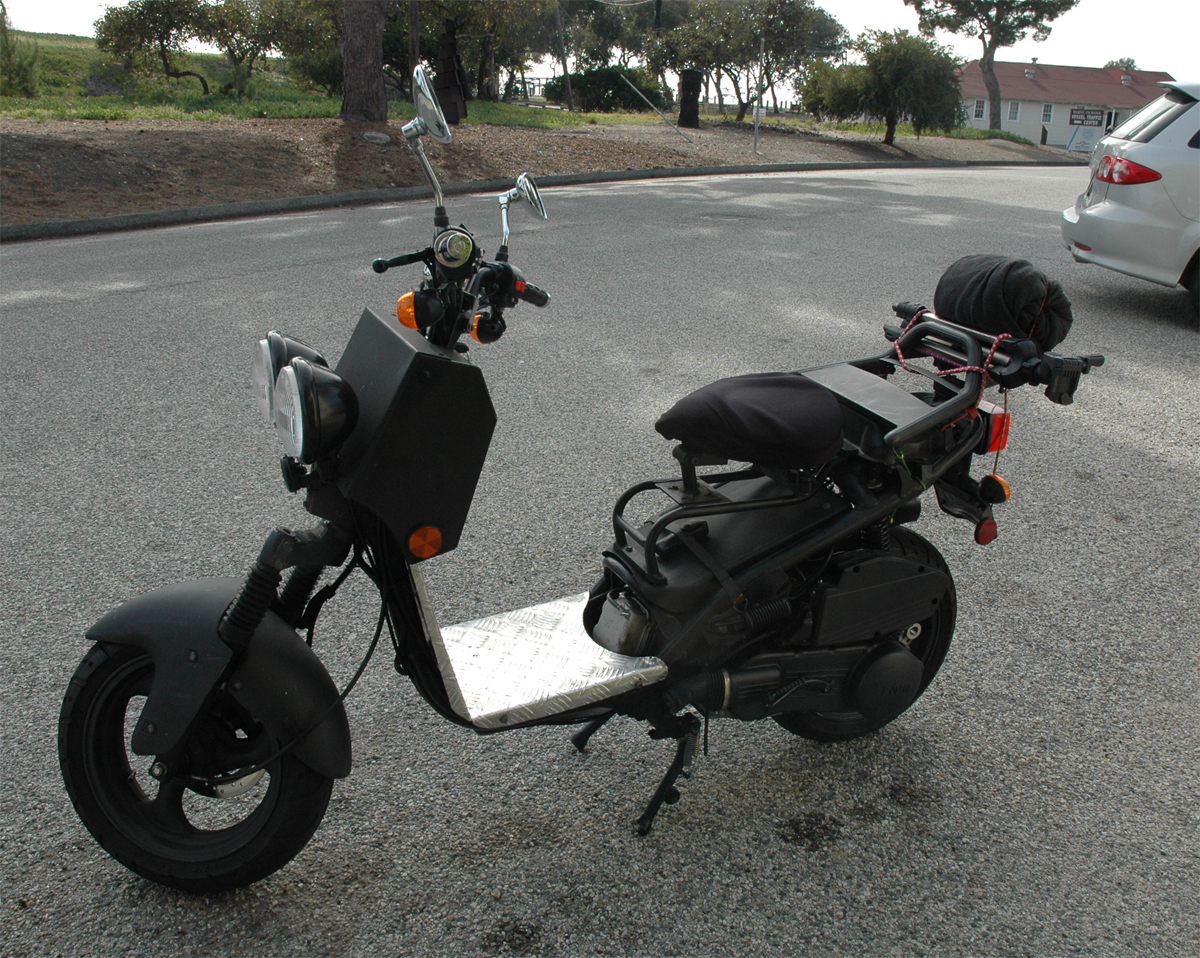
TN'G Baja 150 cc scooter

Formally Twist N' Go, TNG is a motor scooter brand of CMSI, an importer, assembler, and distributor in the United States with more than 150 dealers and service centers. CMSI imports motor scooter components from China, Taiwan, Japan and the U.S. It assembles and tests its products in Preston, Washington. TN'G is the only brand whose scooters are assembled and tested in the United States before they are distributed to dealers.

== Models ==
=== 49cc ===
- LS 49
- Venice
- Venice LX
- Milano

=== 150cc ===
- Milano
- Verona
- Baja
- DR 150
- Low Boy

=== Motorcycles ===
- Chicago 250cc

== In popular media ==
The character J.D. from the TV sitcom Scrubs drives a TN'G Venice.
