= Cycle-Scoot =

American scooter manufacturer

Skirvin Enterprise LLC
- Industry: Scooter
- Founded: 1944 in Indiana
- Founder: Woodrow Wilson Skirvin
- Headquarters: Indianapolis, United States
- Website: Cycle-Scoot.com

Cycle-Scoot is an American line of scooters created by aircraft engineer & entrepreneur Woodrow Wilson Skirvin in 1953. The scooter was largely popular during the 1950s due to its Indianapolis "500" campaign & wide distribution across the country.

== History ==
During World War II, Woodrow Wilson Skirvin headed to Detroit, Michigan, to land a job at a war plant. He found his opportunity at a tool & die company. In 1944, he moved back to Indianapolis and started engineering aircraft parts in his garage. Due to demand, He quickly outgrew several shops. With Allison Engine Company and General Motors being his prime customers, two different engines using Skirvin parts powered airplanes successively setting new world air speed records. The first was the United States Air Force Lockheed P-80 Shooting Star, which achieved 623.8 MPH on June 9, 1947. The second was a Navy D-558 Douglas Skystreak, which achieved 650.6 MPH on Aug 25th, 1947. In 1951 with a government loan of $100,000 W.W. Skirvin built the 25,000-square-foot (2,300 m^{2}) building where the Cycle-Scoot was designed and manufactured.

== Design ==
The early Cycle-Scoot featured an "exclusive" combination foot throttle and brake designed by W. W. Skirvin. The rider would push down with the toe to go, push down with the heel to stop. This design gave the scooter the "hands-free" braking simplicity of a cruiser bicycle. Most Cycle-Scoots had Clinton or Briggs-Stratton engines that would power the scooter to 30 mph. Mileage was claimed to be 100 MPG. Standard accessories included lights, tandem "buddy seat", parking stand, belt cover, foot rests, seat hand rail for passenger, gravel shield, and fork panel. Models include the 500, Deluxe and an army-green model known as "The General" for General Motors. The Cycle-Scoot was officially tested and proved at the Indianapolis Motor Speedway by track-President and 3-time Indy 500 Champion, Wilbur Shaw.

== Popular culture ==
These scooters were officially used at the Indianapolis Brickyard by track administrators, race-car drivers and others as an efficient way to navigate the track grounds. General intended market was the 14- to 17-year-old age group who didn't drive cars. They were used for family fun and work transportation. Nicknames for the bike include "Indianapolis 500 Cycle-Scoot", The "500", & "Skirvin Deluxe".

== See also ==
- Scooter (motorcycle) – scooters after World War II
- Johnson Motor Wheel - another Indiana scooter company
