= Agrati =

Agrati was an Italian motorcycle company who built scooters and mopeds between 1958 and 1965. In 1961 Agrati was merged with Garelli Motorcycles, and from 1965 all bikes were produced under the Garelli name.

== See also ==
- List of Italian companies
- List of motorcycle manufacturers
