= Peirspeed =

Peirspeed is an American importer and distributor of parts for motor scooters. They previously imported scooters from Taiwan-based TGB and an underbone motorcycle from Sachs Motorcycles. The TGB-sourced scooters were re-branded as Peirspeed.
