= Jinan Qingqi =

Chinese motorcycle manufacturer

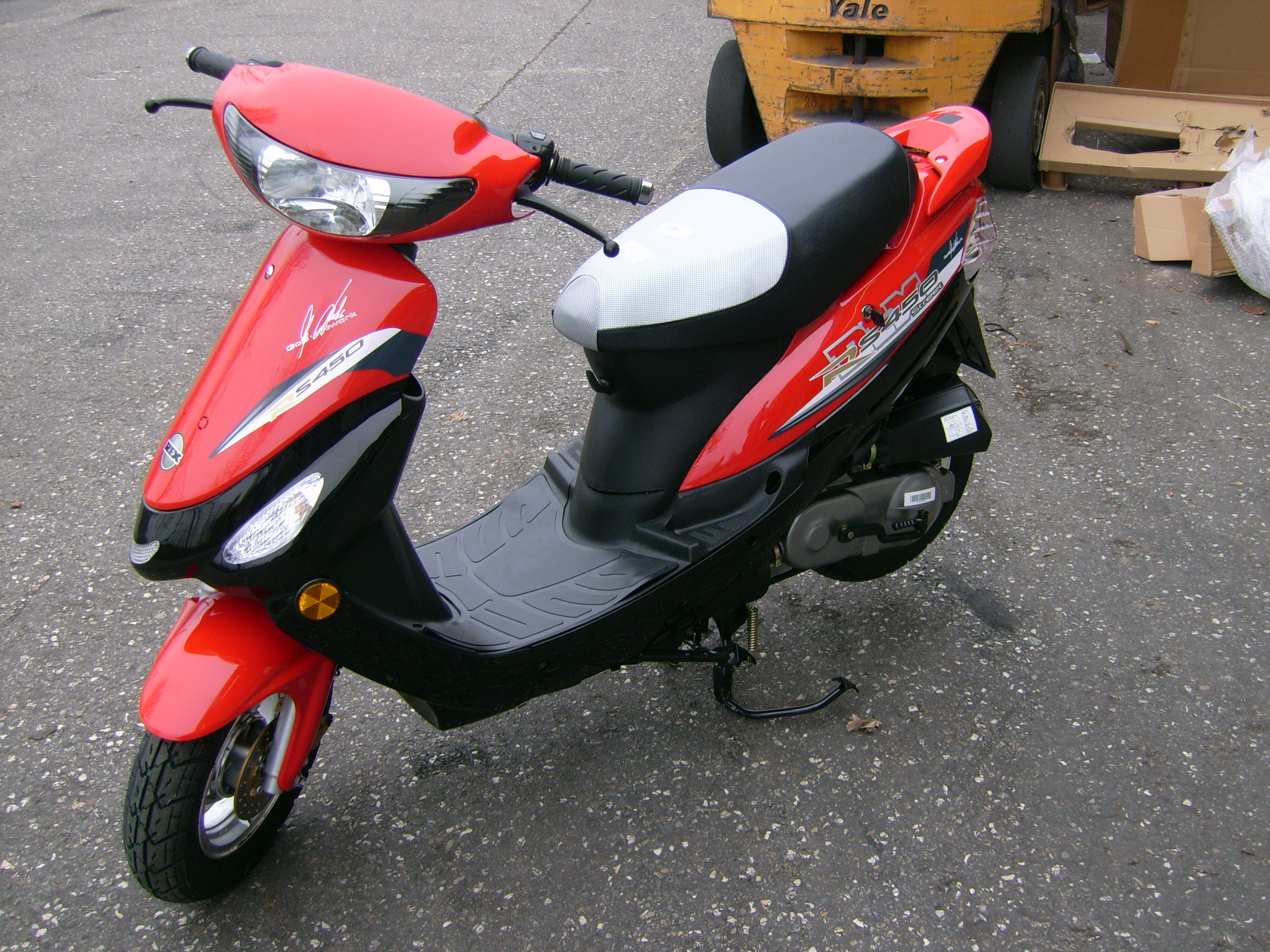
Mokick scooter, manufactured by Jinan Qingqi

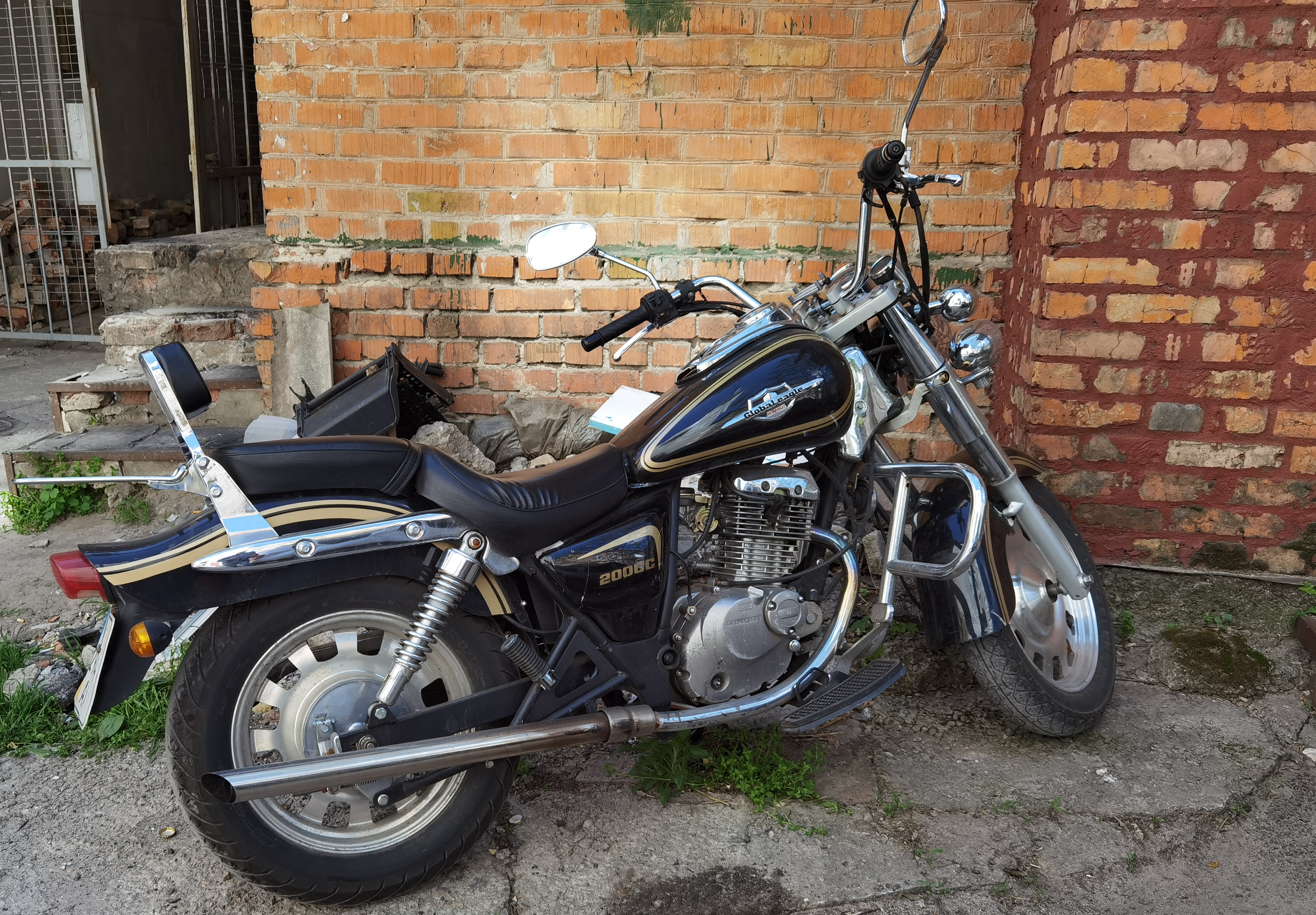
Qingqi Global Eagle in Dnipro, Ukraine

Jinan Qingqi Motorcycle Co., Ltd (Chinese: 济南轻骑摩托车股份有限公司) is a Chinese manufacturer of mopeds, quadbikes and other small engined & electric motorcycles that was founded in 1956. The company headquarters is located in Jinan, Shandong Province. Qingqi is probably the best known moped brand in modern China and the company is one of the larger manufacturers of small engine motorcycles in the world, but is almost completely unknown outside its domestic market, it is however a large original equipment manufacturer provider to companies such as Cycle Union, Suzuki and Peugeot. In the case of the latter two companies that has eventually lead to the formation of joint ventures including JQ/Suzuki venture called Plum Qingqi Motors company that is based in Pakistan and also trades using the Qingqi trademark. The company also manufactures 125cc motorcycles for Mash.
