= GOVECS =

Govecs AG
- Type: Aktiengesellschaft
- Industry: Automotive
- Founded: July 2009; 17 years ago
- Founders: Thomas Grübel, co-founder and CEO; Nicholas Holdcraft, co-founder and COO
- Headquarters: Munich, Germany
- Products: Vehicle manufacturers
- Number of employees: 230
- Website: www.govecsgroup.com

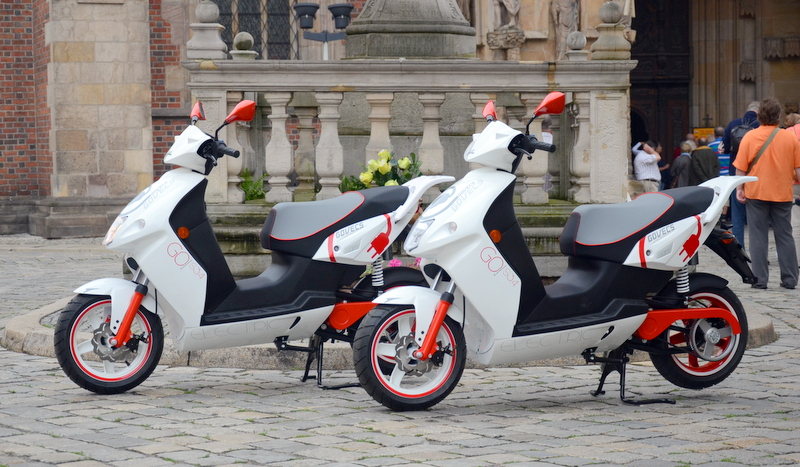
GOVECS Electric Scooters

GOVECS is a German manufacturer of a variety of electric vehicles distributed under its own brand or developed and produced for other brands. The company is headquartered in Munich, but production of all vehicles takes place in the company's own factory in Wrocław, Poland. The main product line is one of electric scooters marketed to private users as well as to fleet operators, such as delivery services, in a transport version under the GOVECS GO! brand. The company markets its GOVECS GO! electric scooters in the US and 17 European countries. The core markets are Germany, France, Spain, and Portugal, as well as the Benelux countries.

== History ==
GOVECS was founded in 2009 by Thomas Grübel, Nicholas Holdcraft, and Gerald Vollnhals. Since 2010, the company is in a cooperative agreement with the Robert Bosch conglomerate which offers vehicle service to GOVECS customers.

In 2012, investment company Gimv invested four million Euros in GOVECS. That year, GOVECS supplied Spanish Company Cooltra with 500 scooters for their rental fleet. In the wake of the deal Barcelona became the first European City with a large-scale rental service for electric scooters. In 2013, GOVECS opened its production plant in Wrocław. In July 2015 GOVECS acquired the complete manufacturing plants of the e-scooters pioneer Vectrix, which were also located in Wrocław, expanding output capacity to 20,000 e-scooters annually.

Starting June 2015, GOVECS supplied 150 e-scooters to Scoot Network, the leading supplier of base-independent e-scooter sharing services, based in San Francisco.

== Awards ==
- 2013 – European Scooter of the Year - GO! S1.4 25 km/h category
- 2012 – European Scooter of the Year - GO! S2.4 25 km/h category and GO! T2.4 45 km/h category
- 2012 – eCarTec Award - GO! S1.4 in the "Electric vehicle: Motorcycle" category
- 2011 – European Scooter of the Year - GO! S2.4 45 km/h category
- 2011 – eCarTec Award - Bavarian state award for electric and hybrid mobility
