= Taiwan Golden Bee =

Personal transportation equipment company

Taiwan Golden Bee Co. Ltd.
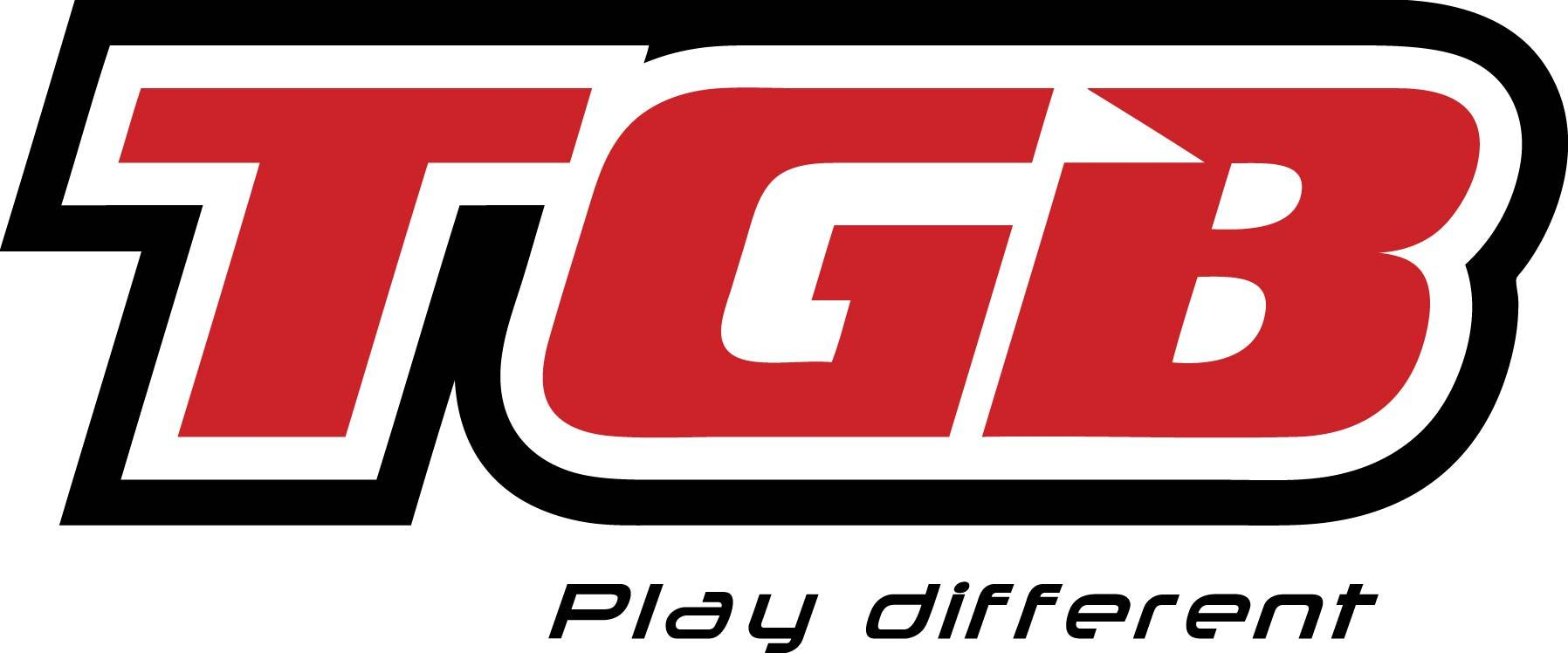
- Founded: 1 April 1978
- Headquarters: Kaohsiung, Taiwan
- Products: ATVs, scooters, engines
- Website: www.tgb.com.tw

Taiwan Golden Bee (TGB) is a Taiwanese manufacturer of scooters, and all-terrain vehicles. The company was established by Chi-Fu Chang, who had previously run the Taiwanese division of Vespa and applied the manufacturing techniques from this to TGB.

The company was established in 1978 based on Piaggio technology for the production of Vespa scooter components. TGB also manufactures continuously variable transmissions for Piaggio, Rotax, Peugeot Motocycles, Minarelli, Morini, Polaris and SYM.

All Taiwan Golden Bee Products
Product	Information
TGB Delivery	Produced 2006-2008. Came in 3 trim levels; 50cc, 125cc, 150cc. Known for the large trunk made to carry food for delivery companies. Shares a body with the Laser More
TGB Laser	Produced 2005-2008. Comes with multiple engine sizes, shares a body with the delivery, replacing the trunk with a passenger seat. More
Bellavita	125 cc or 260cc scooter made from 2013 to present day. More
Blade	Produced 2010 to present day. The Blade is a series of different power ATV's made for offroading MoreMore
X-Motion	Produced for one year from 2012-2013, the 250cc X-Motion was replaced by the Bellavita. More
LandMax	Production 2024 to present day. 83hp 1000cc v-twin engine UTV Made in trim models LandMax SE(marketed as EPS in Canada, has net doors and less comfort features) LandMax Premium(has half doors and some comfort features) and LandMax Pro(full doors and the full comfort features) Premium and Pro are only available in the United States.American Site Canadian Site Russian Site Global Site

== See also ==
- List of companies of Taiwan
- List of motor scooter manufacturers and brands
- List of Taiwanese automakers
- Automotive industry in Taiwan
