= Serveta =

Spanish scooter manufacturer

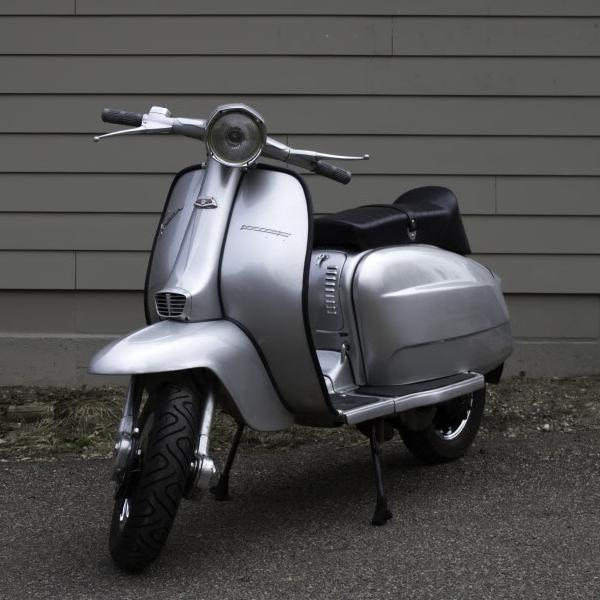
A Spanish-built Lambretta. Note the carburettor air-intake grill on the toolbox lid.

Serveta was a Spanish scooter manufacturer in production between 1954 and 1989.

== History ==
In 1952 a group of Basque businessmen trading as Lambretta Locomociones SA obtained a licence to build Lambretta scooters in Spain. Production began two years later at a purpose-built factory in Eibar. Sales were good and around 1964 the company began to use the name Serveta SA for its own commercial activities.

In 1982 the company changed its name to Lambretta SAL following a change of ownership. A downfall in the company's fortunes saw a further change of ownership in 1985 and production transferred to a shared factory in Amurrio. By the late 1980s sales had fallen even further and scooters were only being built on a made to order batch basis. Production finally ceased in 1989.

== Markets ==
Servetas were initially only produced for the Spanish domestic market. However, by 1970 Spanish built machines were being sold in the UK by Lambretta Concessionaires alongside their Innocenti equivalents.

By the end of the decade Serveta scooters were being sold in the United States and the UK under their own name.
