= Vento (motorcycle manufacturer) =

American manufacturer

Vento is a motorcycle, scooter, ATV, and off-road vehicle brand associated with Vento Motorcycles, Inc., an American company that has sold vehicles in Mexico and other markets. The Vento name means “wind” in Italian. The brand’s history has been linked to U.S. and Mexico operations, including motorcycle assembly for export to Mexico.

In May 2025 Vento switched its point of sale technology to Teamwork Commerce to lower retail costs and increase speed of transactions.

== Facilities ==
In 1998, an assembly and quality control plant was opened in Laredo, Texas. This plant was used for assembly and quality-control work. All of the components were brought to Laredo where they were assembled and quality control work was performed. By 2006, Vento Motorcycles U.S.A. was described as having its headquarters in San Diego, with assembly and quality-control facilities in Laredo, Texas, and a marketing, product development, and dealer and distributor support center in Melbourne, Florida.

Vento's corporate office was located in San Diego, California, where various operations varying from product design and development to customer support took place. Vento's sales organization is structured in the United States through a network of over 175 dealers in more than 30 states; there are more than 300 Vento outlets worldwide. FY 2003 sales in the United States totaled 17,840 units. A sum of 77,600 Vento motorcycles was sold that same year in Chile, Dominican Republic, Guatemala, Mexico, Venezuela, Puerto Rico, and Russia combined. (Includes highway motorcycles, scooters, utility, and ATVs). Vento sells more small-displacement two-wheel vehicles in Mexico than Yamaha, Suzuki, Honda, and Kawasaki combined.

In 2006, Powersports Business reported that Vento served dealers in more than 30 U.S. states and had more than 20 distributors worldwide.

== Products ==
Vento products included motorcycles, scooters, ATVs, and off-road vehicles. Vento Motorcycles, Inc. submitted vehicle identification number decoding information to the National Highway Traffic Safety Administration for several vehicle types, including motorcycles, scooters, and ATVs. Some Vento motorcycle models also received California Air Resources Board emissions certification for specific model years.

Vento motorcycles included small-displacement cruiser-style models, including 250 cc V-twin motorcycles. Some models used cruiser-style bodywork while remaining lighter than many larger-displacement cruisers.
