= List of motorcycle manufacturers =

The following is a list of motorcycle manufacturers worldwide, sorted by extant/extinct status and by country. These are producers whose motorcycles are available to the public, including both street legal as well as racetrack-only or off-road-only motorcycles. The list of current manufacturers does not include badge engineered bikes or motorcycle customisers, but the list of defunct manufactures may include some of these if they are well remembered for their historical significance.

== Manufacturers in production ==
Manufacturer	Country	
Motomel	Argentina	
Zanella	Argentina	
Hunter Motorcycles	Australia	
Thumpstar	Australia	
Husqvarna	Australia	Austria
KTM		Austria
Puch		Austria
Akij Motors	Bangladesh	
Nitol Niloy Group	Bangladesh	
Runner Automobiles	Bangladesh	
Walton Motors	Bangladesh	
MMZ	Belarus	
Dafra Motos	Brazil	
Voltz	Brazil	
Can-Am	Canada	
Havoc Motorcycles	Canada	
CFMoto	China	
Chang Jiang	China	
Dayun	China	
Evoke Motorcycles	China	
Gaokin	China	
Jincheng Group	China	
Keeway	China	
Lifan	China	
Loncin	China	
Niu Technologies	China	
QJMotor	China	
Qingqi	China	
Segway Inc.	China	
Sur-Ron	China	
Yinxiang Motorcycle	China	
Znen	China	
Zongshen	China	
ZXMOTO	China	
AKT	China	Colombia
Auteco		Colombia
Jawa Moto	Czech Republic	
Midual	France	
Peugeot Scooters	France	
Sherco	France	
Voxan	France	
BMW Motorrad	Germany	
Sachs Motorcycles	Germany	
Ather Energy	India	
Bajaj Auto	India	
Hero MotoCorp	India	
Ola Electric	India	
Royal Enfield	India	
Simple Energy	India	
TVS Motor	India	
Ultraviolette Automotive	India	
Vida	India	
Astra International	India	Indonesia
Viar Motor Indonesia	India	Indonesia
Aprilia	India	Italy
Askoll	India	Italy
Beta Motor	India	Italy
Benelli	India	Italy
Bimota		Italy
Ducati		Italy
Energica		Italy
Fantic Motor		Italy
Ghezzi & Brian		Italy
Italjet		Italy
Lambretta		Italy
Magni		Italy
FB Mondial		Italy
Moto Guzzi		Italy
Malaguti		Italy
Moto Morini		Italy
MV Agusta		Italy
Paton		Italy
Piaggio		Italy
SWM		Italy
Terra Modena		Italy
Vespa		Italy
Vyrus		Italy
Honda	Japan	
Moriwaki	Japan	
Kawasaki	Japan	
Suzuki	Japan	
Yamaha	Japan	
DNA Motors	South Korea	
KR Motors	South Korea	
Modenas	Malaysia	
Naza	Malaysia	
Italika	Mexico	
DYL Motorcycles	Pakistan	
Sazgar	Pakistan	
United Auto Industries	Pakistan	
Atlas Honda	Pakistan	
Pak Suzuki Motors	Pakistan	
Junak	Pakistan	
AJP	Pakistan	
FAMEL	Pakistan	
IMZ-Ural	Pakistan	
IZh	Pakistan	
Velomotors
ZiD
Qooder	Switzerland	
Tomos	Slovenia	
Derbi	Spain	
Gas Gas	Spain	
Montesa	Spain	
Rieju	Spain	
Husqvarna	Sweden	
Aeon Motor	Taiwan	
Gogoro	Taiwan	
Kymco	Taiwan	
PGO	Taiwan	
SYM	Taiwan	
Taiwan Golden Bee	Taiwan	
Dayang Motors	Thailand	
Mondial	Turkey	
KMZ	Ukraine	
Ariel Motor Company	United Kingdom	
Cheney Racing	United Kingdom	
Clews Competition Motorcycles	United Kingdom	
Métisse	United Kingdom	
Scomadi	United Kingdom	
Triumph	United Kingdom	
Wasp Motorcycles	United Kingdom	
Alligator	United Kingdom	United States
ARCH Motorcycle		United States
Boss Hoss		United States
Brammo		United States
Cleveland CycleWerks		United States
Confederate/Curtiss Motorcycles		United States
Harley-Davidson		United States
Indian Motorcycle		United States
Janus Motorcycles		United States
Lightning Motorcycle		United States
MTT		United States
Rokon		United States
US Highland		United States
Z Electric Vehicle		United States
Zero Motorcycles		United States

== Manufacturers no longer in production ==
This is a list of companies that formerly produced and sold motorcycles available to the public, including both street and race/off-road motorcycles. It also includes some former motorcycle producers of noted historical significance but which would today be classified as badge engineered or customisers. It includes both companies that are defunct, those that still exist but no longer make motorcycles, and some that were acquired by other companies.

=== Argentina ===
- Siambretta
- Tehuelche
- Puma

=== Australia ===
- Abbotsford motorcycles (1912–1913)
- Absolom motorcycles (1915–)
- Aussi Also (1920–)
- Bennett & Barkell Motorcycles (1910 to at least 1917)
- Waratah motorcycles (1911 to around 1948)

=== Austria ===
- Delta-Gnom (1923–1963)
- Laurin & Klement (1899–1908)

=== Belgium ===
- FN (1901–1967)
- Gillet Herstal
- Minerva (1900–1914)
- Saroléa (1901–1960)

=== Brazil ===
- Agrale (1984–1987)
- Brumana Pugliese (1970–1982)

=== Bulgaria ===
- Balkan (1958–1975)

=== Canada ===
- Can-Am (1973–1987, brand reused 2006–present for ATVs and trikes)
- Moto-Skeeter (mini-bikes, 1971–1972)

=== Czech Republic ===
- Böhmerland (1923–1939)
- CZ (1935–1997)
- ESO (1949–1962)
- Praga Hostivař (1929–1933)
- Premier (1913–1933)

=== Denmark ===
- Nimbus (1919–1959)

=== Estonia ===
- Renard (1938-1944)

=== Finland ===
- Helkama
- Tunturi

=== France ===
- AGF
- Aiglon (1908–1953)
- Alcyon (1904–1957)
- Automoto
- Dollar (1925–1939)
- Dresch (1923–1939)
- Gima
- Gnome et Rhône (1919–1959)
- Juery (1930s–1960s)
- Monet-Goyon
- Motobécane
- New-Map
- Nougier
- Radior
- Ratier (1959–1962)
- Scorpa (1993–2009)
- Terrot

=== Germany ===
- Adler (1900–1957)
- Ardie (1919–1957)
- D-Rad (1923–1933)
- DKW (1916–1966)
- Express (1933–1958)
- Hansen & Schneider (1975-1982)
- Hecker (1922–1957)
- Hercules (1904–1996)
- Hildebrand & Wolfmüller (1894–1897)
- Hoffman (1949–1954)
- Horex (1923–1960)
- Killinger and Freund Motorcycle (1935–)
- Kreidler (1951–1982)
- Maico (1926–1986)
- Mars (1903–1958)
- Megola (1921–1925)
- Münch (1966–1980)
- Neander (1924–1932)
- NSU (1901–1960)
- Opel (1901–1930)
- Orionette (1921–1925)
- Simson (1948–1963)
- TWN (Triumph Nürnberg) (1903–1957)
- Victoria (1899–1966)
- Wanderer (1902–1929)
- Windhoff (not anymore)
- Zündapp (1921–1984)

=== East Germany ===
- BMW (1945–1952)
- EMW (1952–)
- MZ (1906−2009)

=== Greece ===
- Alta (1962–1972)
- Lefas (1982–2005)
- Maratos (1950)
- MEBEA (1960–1975)
- Mego (1962–1992)

=== Hungary ===
- Csepel (1932–1951, Pannonia 1951–1975)

=== India ===
- Andhra Pradesh Scooters Ltd (Allwyn Pushpak)
- API (Lamby scooters)
- Escorts Group (WFM/Yamaha motorcycles)
- Ideal Jawa (1960–1996)
- Kinetic Engineering (Luna/Honda NH scooters)
- LML (Vespa scooters)
- Mopeds India Limited (Suvega-Motobecane mopeds)

=== Italy ===
- Abra
- Accossato
- Aermacchi
- Aeromere/Capriolo
- Aetos
- Agrati
- AIM
- Alano
- Alato
- Aldbert
- Atala
- Autozodiaco
- Bianchi (1897–1967)
- Cagiva
- Caproni
- Ceccato (1947–1962)
- Cimatti
- CNA
- Della Ferrera
- Frera
- Fusi
- Galbusera
- Garelli Motorcycles (1919–2012)
- Gilera
- Innocenti (1947–1997)
- Iso Rivolta (1953–1974)
- Lamborghini (1986)
- Lambretta
- Laverda (1949–2006)
- Malaguti (1930-2018)
- Malanca (1956–1986)
- MAS
- Maserati (1947–1960)
- Morbidelli
- Moretti Motor Company
- Moto Rumi
- Motobi
- Santamaria (1951–1963)

=== Japan ===
- Abe-Star (1951–1958)
- Aero (1925–1927)
- Bridgestone (1952–1970)
- Fuji
- Hodaka (1964–1980)
- Marusho (1948–1967)
- Meguro (1937–1964)
- Mitsubishi (1946–1963)
- Miyata
- Rikuo (1929–1958)
- Shin Meiwa (1952–1964)
- Tohatsu (1950–1964)
- Yamaguchi (1955–1963)

=== Mexico ===
- Cooper (1971–1975)

=== Netherlands ===
- Van Veen (motorcycle) (1974–1981)
- Eysink (1903–1919)
- Sparta B.V.

=== New Zealand ===
- Britten Motorcycles
- Nzeta
- Wood

=== Norway ===
- Tempo

=== Poland ===
- CWS
- SHL
- SM
- Sokół
- WFM
- WSK
- Zuch

=== Portugal ===
- CASAL (1953–2000)
- SIS

=== Russian Empire ===
- Alexander Leutner & Co. (1899–1918?)

=== Slovak Republic ===
- Babetta (1970–1997)

=== Spain ===
- Alpha (1924-1957)
- Avello (1940-2013)
- Bultaco (1958–1983)
- Cofersa (1954–1962)
- Gimson (1930–1982)
- Lube (1947–1967)
- Montesa (1945–1985)
- MotoTrans (1957–1983)
- Ossa (1924–1982; 2010–2015)
- Sanglas (1942–1981)

=== Sweden ===
- Aktiv (1927–1937)
- Husaberg (1988–2014)
- Monark
- Nordstjernan

=== Switzerland ===
- Motosacoche (1900–1956)

=== United Kingdom ===
- Ackland Motorcycles Co (1895–1936)
- Acme Motor Co (1902–1922)
- AJS
- AJW (1928–1977)
- Allen Norton (1990–1994)
- Ambassador (1946–1964)
- AMC (1938–1966)
- Ariel (1902–1970)
- Armstrong (1980–1987)
- Beardmore Precision (1921–1924)
- Blackburne (1913–1921)
- Brough (1908–1926)
- Brough Superior³ (1919–1940)
- BSA (1905–2003); see BSA Company
- Calthorpe
- Clyno (1908–1923)
- Cotton
- Coventry-Eagle
- DOT
- Douglas (1907–1957)
- EMC (1946–1977)
- Excelsior (Coventry) (1896–1962)
- Francis-Barnett (1919–1966)
- Greeves
- Haden
- Hesketh (1982–1984)
- HRD
- Ivy (1907–1934)
- James (1987–1966)
- JAP (1902–1964)
- Levis (1911–1939)
- Martinsyde (1908–1923)
- Matchless (1899–1966)
- Megelli (2004–2014)
- Ner-a Car (1921–1926)
- New Hudson
- New Imperial (1901–1939)
- Norman
- Norton-Villiers (1966-1972)
- Norton (1902–; reformed in 2008)
- OEC (1901–1954)
- OK-Supreme (1882–1940)
- Panther
- Quadrant (1901–1928)
- Quasar (1977–1985)
- Raleigh (1899–1967)
- Rickman (1960–1975)
- Royal Enfield (1901–1968); company was taken over by India's Eicher Motors)
- Rudge (1909–1939)
- Scott (1909–1978)
- Singer
- Sprite
- Stevens (1934–1938)
- Sun (1911–1961)
- Sunbeam (1912–1956)
- Tandon
- Triumph Engineering Ltd (1902–; reformed in the 1980s and now still made)
- Velocette (1904–1968)
- Villiers
- Vincent
- Vincent HRD (1928– )
- Wooler (1911–1954)
- Zenith (1903–1950)

=== United States ===
- ATK (1982-2016)
- Ace (1920–1927)
- Alta Motors (2010-2018)
- American IronHorse (1995–2008)
- Buell (2009–2015)
- Buell Motorcycle Company (1983–2009)
- California Motorcycle Company (?–1999)
- Crocker (1932–1941)
- Curtiss (1902–1910) Reformed in 2017
- Cushman (1936–1965)
- Excelsior (Chicago) (1907–1931)
- Excelsior-Henderson (1993 / 1998–2001)
- Fischer
- Flying Merkel (1911–1915)
- Henderson (1911–1931)
- Hodaka (1965–1978)
- Indian
  - original Springfield company (1901–1953)
  - Gilroy company (1999–2003)
  - Stellican Limited (2006–2011)
- Iver Johnson (1907–1916)
- MotoCzysz
- Mustang (1945–1963)
- Ner-A-Car (1921–1927)
- Penton (1968–1978)
- Pierce-Arrow (1909–1913)
- Pope Manufacturing Company (1902–1918)
- Ridley
- Roehr Motorcycles
- Sears, Roebuck and Company (1912–1916)
- Simplex (1935–1960)
- Thor (1908–1920)
- Titan
- Victory Motorcycles (1997–2017)
- Wagner Motorcycle Company (1901–1914)
- Yankee

=== USSR ===
- Cossack (1920 - 1979)
- GMZ (1941–1949)
- MMZ (1941, 1946–1951)
- NATI (1931–1933)
- PMZ (1935–1939)
- TIZ (1936–1941)
- TMZ (1941–1943)

=== Vietnam ===
- Vinaxuki
- Vinfast
- Dat Bike

== See also ==
- List of motor scooter manufacturers and brands
- List of car brands
