= WSK =

WSK may refer to:

- IATA code for Chongqing Wushan Airport, China
- Quanguo Waiyu Shuiping Kaoshi or WSK, a foreign language test administered in China
- Windows Vista networking technologies#Winsock Kernel
- Wytwórnia Sprzętu Komunikacyjnego (WSK, Transport Equipment Works), a name of Polish aerospace and automotive factories - see PZL
- WSK (motorcycle), defunct Polish motorcycle manufacturer
- WSK (karting), a karting organization that operates the WSK Euro Series
- Wajahat Saeed Khan (born 1978), Pakistani journalist
