= Michael Hansen =

Michael Hansen may refer to:

- Michael Hansen (footballer) (born 1971), Danish football midfielder
- Michael Hansen (sailor) (born 1990), Danish competitive sailor
- Michael E. Hansen, chief executive officer of Cengage Learning
- Michael Sahl Hansen (born 1978), Danish handball player
- Manse (DJ) (Michael Hansen), Swedish DJ and record producer
- Michael Hansen, motorcycle producer, see Hansen & Schneider (motorcycle)
- Michael "Tubby" Hansen, New Zealand perennial candidate

== See also ==
- Michael Hansson (disambiguation)
