= AIM (motorcycle) =

- Production: 1974–1982
- Class: Sports motorcycle
- Engine: 49 cc, 124 cc Sachs and Franco Morini two-stroke

AIM motorcycles were sports machines built in Italy between 1974 and 1982 using 49 cc and 124 cc Sachs and Franco Morini two-stroke engines.

== See also ==
- List of Italian companies
- List of motorcycle manufacturers
