= Galbusera =

Galbusera (Italian pronunciation: [ɡalbuˈzɛːra]) is a vintage brand of Italian motorcycles made by Moto Galbusera & Co. (later Motocicli Plinio Galbusera) in Brescia from 1934 to 1955.

== History ==
Plinio Galbusera and engineer Adolf Marama Toyo initially built 173 to 498 cc Python (Rudge-Whitworth) and Sturmey-Archer engines into their frames, but in 1938 they made two larger models. One was a 249.2 cc four-two with compressor; the other had a 498.4 cc eight cylinder engine built from two coupled four blocks. It also had a compressor.

Galbusera did not intend to develop much power. His primary goal was to create reliable machines and the top speed of 150 km/hour was very acceptable.

After 1945, the standard engine was 125 to 175 cc with two-Sachs-blocks, later replaced by Villiers engines. In 1955 they began to have financial problems and production was terminated.

== See also ==
- List of Italian companies
- List of motorcycle manufacturers
