= Fusi =

Defunct Italian motorcycle brand

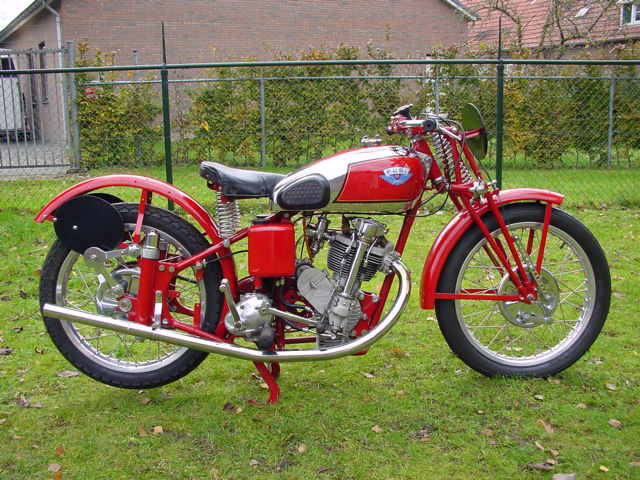
Fusi 250 cc OHC racer from 1937

A. Fusi & Co., S.p.A. Milano (1932–1957) is an historic brand of motorcycles.

Achille Fusi was a trader of FN motorcycles. In 1932 he started building motorcycles under the RAS brand name, mainly with FN parts. They had 175 cc JAP engines made under licence in Italy and Burman gearboxes made under licence by Fiat.

From 1933 Fusi built some models with Italian engines. After Achille Fusi died, Luigi Beaux took over the company. In 1934 the range included 250 cc and 500 cc motorcycles with JAP engines and 175 cc models with a choice of a JAP engine or one made by Fusi themselves. After 1936 Fusi stopped using the RAS brand name and sold its machines as Fusi.

In 1937 Fusi launched a 500 cc powered tricycle as a light goods vehicle. In the same year Fusi bought Catelli i Fiorani in Pesaro, who made CF motorcycles, and rebranded that company's range as Fusi. In 1941 Fusi introduced the M 25 CFS, which had a 248 cc four-stroke engine. This model formed a basis for many further products, including sport bikes, updated and produced until in the 1950s.

== See also ==
- List of Italian companies
- List of motorcycle manufacturers
