= Hodaka (motorcycle) =

Motorcycle manufacturing company

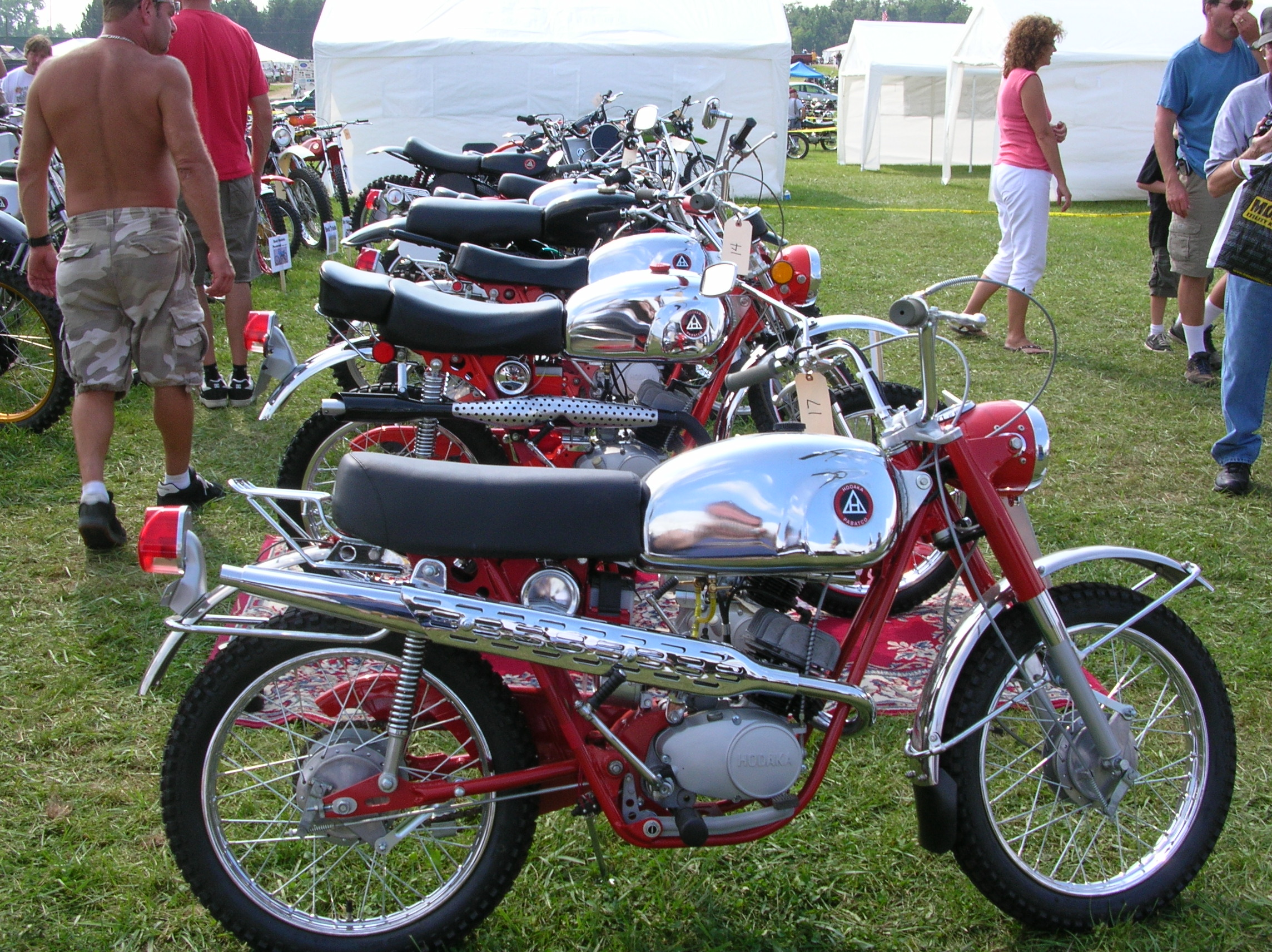
Hodaka Trail Bikes

Hodaka was a joint Japanese and American company that manufactured motorcycles from 1964 to 1978. Close to 150,000 motorcycles were produced within that time. Prior to 1964 Hodaka made engines for the Yamaguchi motorcycle brand.

The worldwide distributor of Hodakas was PABATCO, for Pacific Basin Trading Company. Its headquarters were in the rural town of Athena, Oregon. PABATCO designed and engineered a majority of the motorcycles, and Hodaka in Japan was responsible for the engine and manufacture and assembly. Pabatco was owned by Shell Oil Company from 1965 to 1978. The name Hodaka comes from a mountain near the factory and means "To grow taller".

The Oishi brothers, owners of Hodaka, had taken an extended trip to Europe in the late '50s and during that time they purchased close to 50 European and English motorcycles to take back to Japan to study. It is also rumored Hodaka might have indeed designed the complete Yamaguchi SPB50, not just the engine. Hodaka was also a producer of machine tools and it has been said they borrowed the concept of one of their quick-change gear clusters in one of their metalworking lathes to construct the shift mechanism in the Hodaka gearbox, with the resulting spring-loaded shifting mechanism being patented.

Starting to manufacture complete motorcycles in 1964, Hodaka/PABATCO is credited by some with starting the trail bike craze in the United States. This was due mainly to the design by the off-road motorcycle enthusiasts at PABATCO. On the second year of production Hodaka experimented with reed valves and almost brought them to market. But for some unknown reason they dropped the idea. And subsequently Yamaha is credited with being the first to produce this power enhancing feature. Hodaka models are listed below.

In the late 1970s, a combination of events led to the demise of Hodaka. Falling US dollar exchange rates against the Japanese yen, a shift in demand from dirt bikes to larger road bikes, and general economic weakness fatally wounded the company. Shell attempted to purchase the Hodaka company at one point but the offer was rebuffed by Hodaka in Japan. Some of the tooling was later sold to the Korean company Daelim after Hodaka closed in 1978. In 2014, a complete history including in house notes, blueprints, photos etc. was published. The book is called "Hodaka: The Complete Story of America's Favorite Trailbike". The book is authored by Ken Smith from Australia and has the most comprehensive history of the Hodaka motorcycle brand ever written.

Every year the town of Athena, Oregon, holds an event in June entitled Hodaka Days which includes a parade of Hodaka motorcycles, a bike show, observed trials and motocross competition.

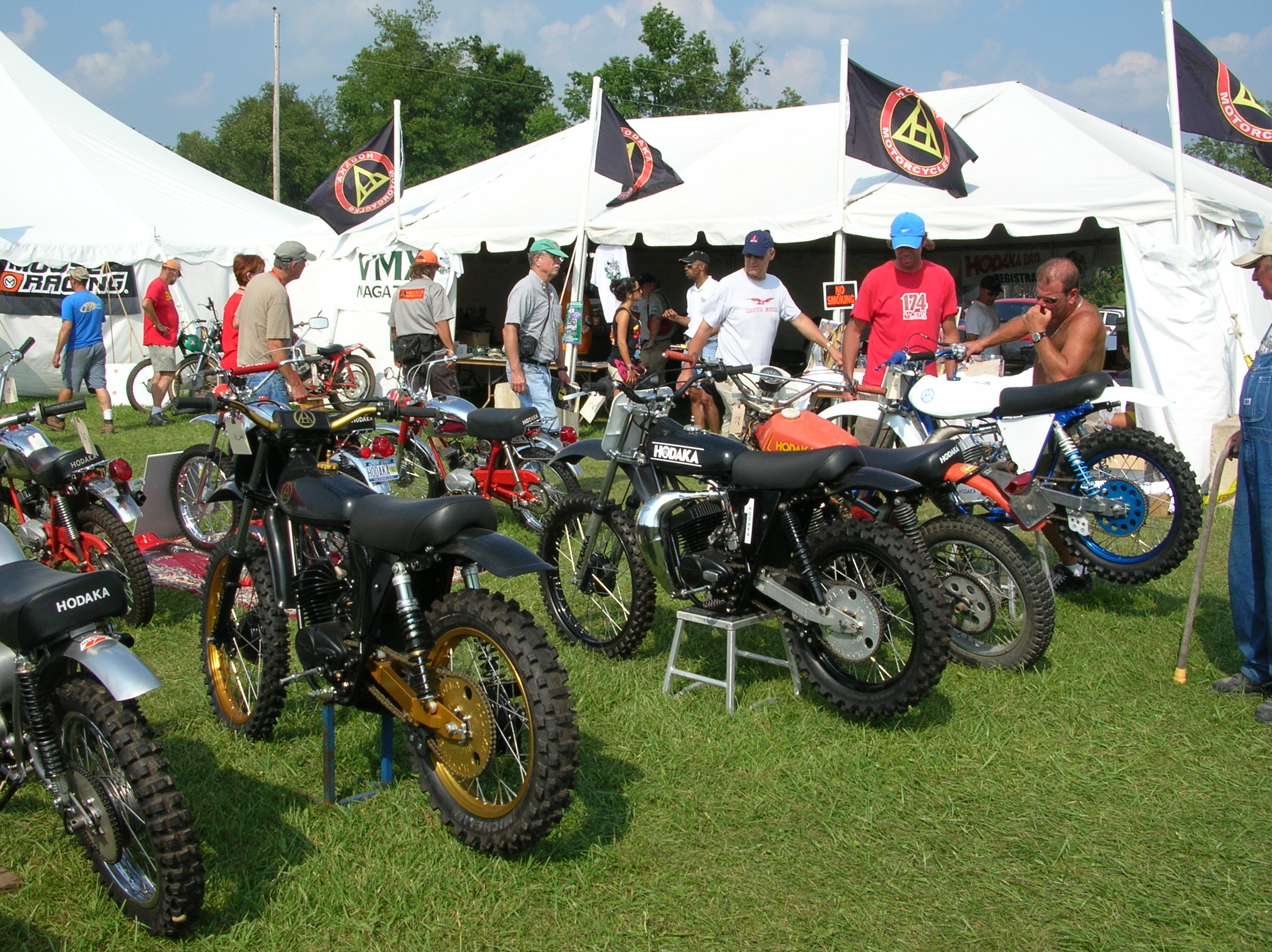
Hodaka Motorcycles

== List of Hodaka motorcycles ==
- Hodaka Ace 90 model 90
- Hodaka Ace 100 model 92
- Hodaka Ace 100 model 92A
- Hodaka Ace 100B model 92B
- Hodaka Ace 100B+ Model 92B+
- Hodaka Ace 100 Super Rat model 93,93A and 93B
- Hodaka 100 Dirt Squirt chrome tank model 96
- Hodaka 100 Road Toad model 99
- Hodaka 100 Super Rat model 98
- Hodaka 125 Super Combat model 97
- Hodaka 125 Combat Wombat model 95
- Hodaka 125 Wombat chrome tank model 94 and 94A
- Hodaka 175SL model 61
- Hodaka Road Toad model 02
- Hodaka Dirt Squirt model 01
- Hodaka 250SL model 70 and 70A
- Hodaka Thunderdog 250ED model 71
- Hodaka Dirt Squirt 80 model 82
