= Terra Modena =

- Founder: Dario Calzavara
- Headquarters: Italy, Modena
- Key people: Dario Calzavara
- Products: electric and hybrid propulsion, motocross, enduro and supermoto motorcycles
- Parent: I-TEA (Iniziative Tecnologiche Applicate) and HPE (owned by Piero Ferrari)
- Website: https://www.terramodena.eu/

Terra Modena Mechatronic srl is an Italian company based in Modena, founded in 2015. The owner and founder is Dario Calzavara known for having held Senior positions in the Ferrari Formula One team from 1980 to 1984 and marketing director of Ferrari North America and subsequently Director of R&D and racing activities of Pirelli Tires. The company, better known as Terra Modena, designs and develops integrated electrical systems [EIPS] for nautical use. After a few years of research and experimentation, the company achieved its first successes in 2019 by obtaining the contract to supply the complete propulsion for the 100% electric catamaran of the Monaco Yacht Club and for having won the Monaco Solar & Energy speed race with the Anvera boat with 74.4 kWh. It is the new world record for electric boats, obtained in sea water and with three passengers on board. The company was awarded by UIM (Union Motonautique Internationale) in 2017 for the electric engine for powerboat racing.

== Supermoto ==
The brand TerraModena is also known for the Terra Modena 198 the supermotard bike that is equipped with a monocylinder F1 engine developed by the HPE of Piero Ferrari in the years 2005/7.

== See also ==
- Motorcycle
- List of Italian companies
- List of motorcycle manufacturers
