= Maserati (motorcycle) =

Maserati Motorcycles
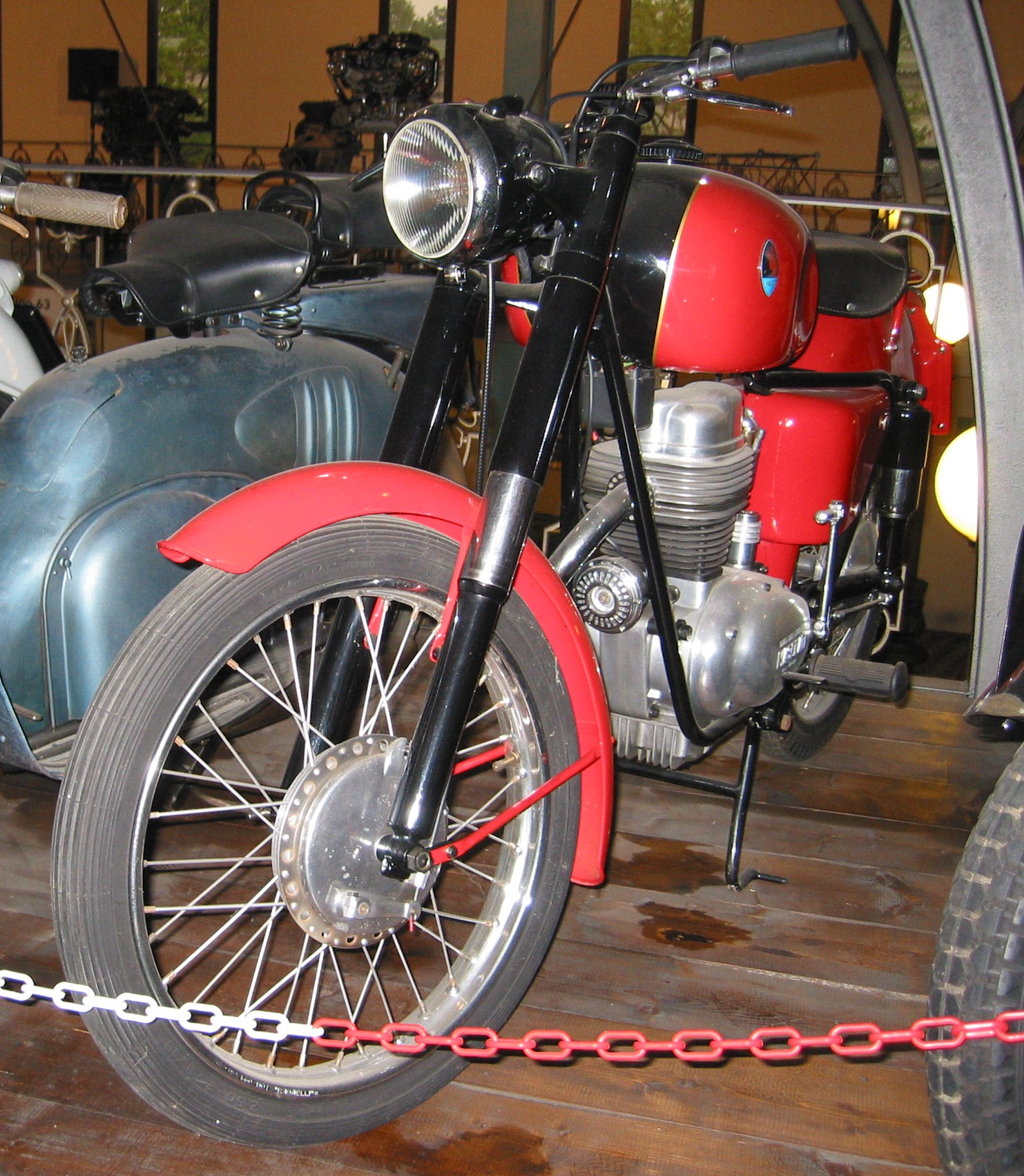
- Headquarters: Modena, Italy

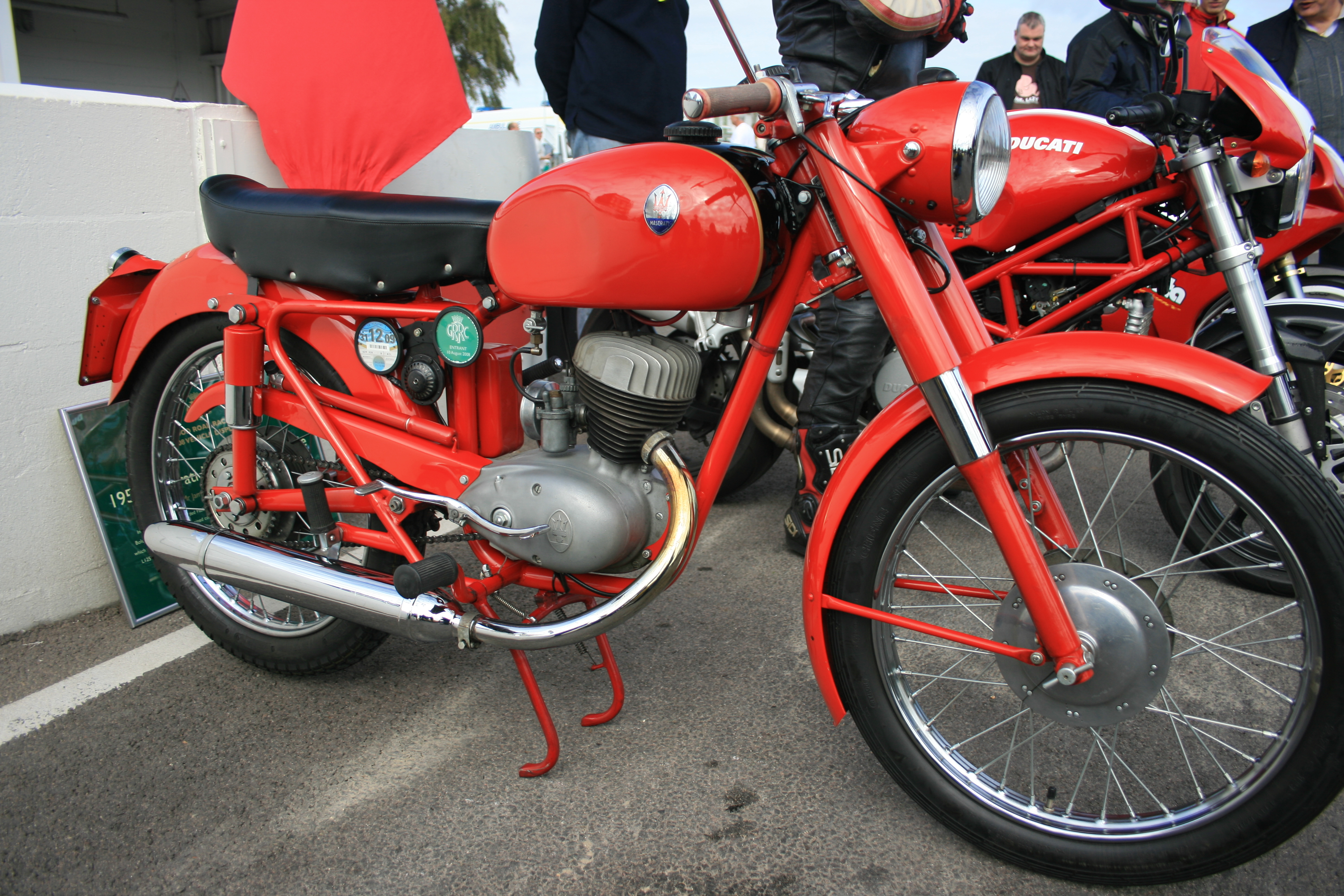
Maserati motorcycle.

Fabbrica Candele Accumulatori Maserati S.p.A. ("Maserati Spark Plugs Batteries factory"; 1947 in Modena – 1960) was an Italian manufacturer of motoring components (spark plugs and accumulators), as well as mopeds and motorcycles. It was part of Adolfo Orsi's large industrial corporation (which included the Maserati car manufacturer), that was divided among siblings (1953). His sister Ida Orsi received over the component branch that was not doing well at the time. By purchasing the Bologna-based motorcycle manufacturer Italmoto (1953), the company entered a new market and sold well locally and had an export line to South Africa, Europe and North America as well. The products were allowed to continue the use of the well-known Maserati name and the company's trident trademark.

The first Maserati motorcycles were the Tipo 125/T2, inspired by a DKW design, and the Tipo 160/T4, based on the Italmoto 160 tourer. Maserati motorcycles were produced in 125cc, 160cc, 175cc and 250cc models with two-stroke and four-stroke engine configurations. Maserati mopeds were offered in 50cc and 75cc versions.

Production ended due to increased competition from other manufacturers (Moto Morini, MV Agusta, Benelli and Laverda), as well as financial troubles that had also hit the car manufacturer.

== Mopeds and motorcycles ==
- 160/T4, a redesign of Italmoto using a 158 cc (1953–59). An 160/T4/TL was also made (1955)
- 125/L/T2 DKW-inspired engine, later T2/TV and T2/GTS (a racing version that also participated in Formula 3 racing, 1957).
- 50/T2/u, a moped for men (umino) or T2/d for women (donne). Sport models T2/S and T2/SS
- minor prototypes and series were based on 75 cc, 175 and 250 cc engines.

== See also ==
- List of Italian companies
- List of motorcycle manufacturers
- Maserati
