= Alato =

Former Motorcycle Manufacturer

Alato was an Italian motorcycle manufacturer from 1923 to 1925. Established by brothers Filio and Giulio Gosio in Turin, the Alato was powered by a 131cc two-stroke engine.

== See also ==
- List of Italian companies
- List of motorcycle manufacturers
