= Abra (motorcycle) =

Historical motorcycle manufacturer

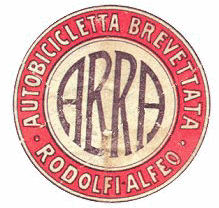

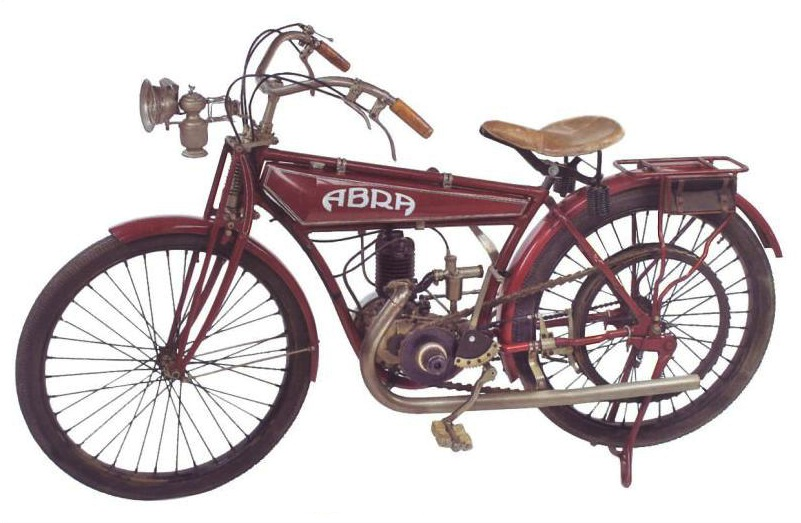
Abra 125 Sport from 1924

The Abra was an Italian motorcycle that was manufactured from 1923 to 1927. The Abra initially used a DKW 146cc two-stroke engine, but from 1924 132cc engines of the company's own design were used. Production was limited.

== See also ==
- List of Italian companies
- List of motorcycle manufacturers
