= Ghezzi & Brian =

Italian motorcycle engineering firm and manufacturer

- Company type: Private
- Industry: Motorcycle manufacturing
- Founded: 1995; 31 years ago
- Headquarters: Missaglia, Italy
- Area served: Worldwide
- Products: Motorcycle
- Website: ghezzi-brian.com

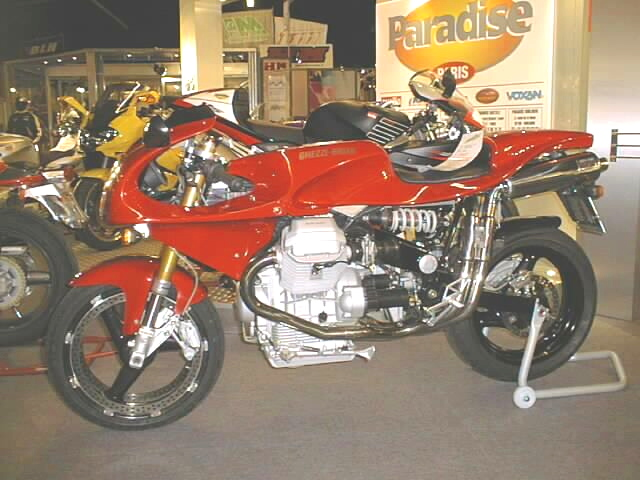
Model SuperTwin 1100

Ghezzi & Brian is an Italian motorcycle engineering firm and manufacturer based in Missaglia.

== History ==
Ghezzi & Brian was founded in 1995 or 1996 by Giuseppe Ghezzi and Bruno (Brian) Saturno, both former racers, to develop racing motorcycles using twin-cylinder engines.

Starting in 1999, the company began to sell motorcycles for street use. A fundamental characteristic of all the Ghezzi & Brian machines is sportiness and personality derived from Moto Guzzi V layout twin-cylinder engines.

== Models ==
The first model put in production is the SuperTwin 1100, derived from the Championship 1996 machine.

The Furia was called "close to streetfighter perfection" in a Motorcycle.com review.

The Pro-Thunder has been developed exclusively for participation in the American A.M.A. Championship. It has a Moto Guzzi 1225 cc motor.

The Fionda was introduced in 2004.

In 2024, the firm introduced the Monza, a Moto Guzzi V11 kit optionally including a new swingarm and high compression pistons.

== Engineering and tuning ==
Ghezzi & Brian are active, beyond being a motorcycle manufacturer, also as:

- Engineering for the motorcycle industry. The activity began in 2002, and that has given rise to the Moto Guzzi MGS-01 Corsa.
- Tuning, dedicated particularly to Moto Guzzi but not exclusively to them. It also produces parts and chassis according to the customer's specifications.

== See also ==
- List of Italian companies
- List of motorcycle manufacturers
