= Della Ferrera =

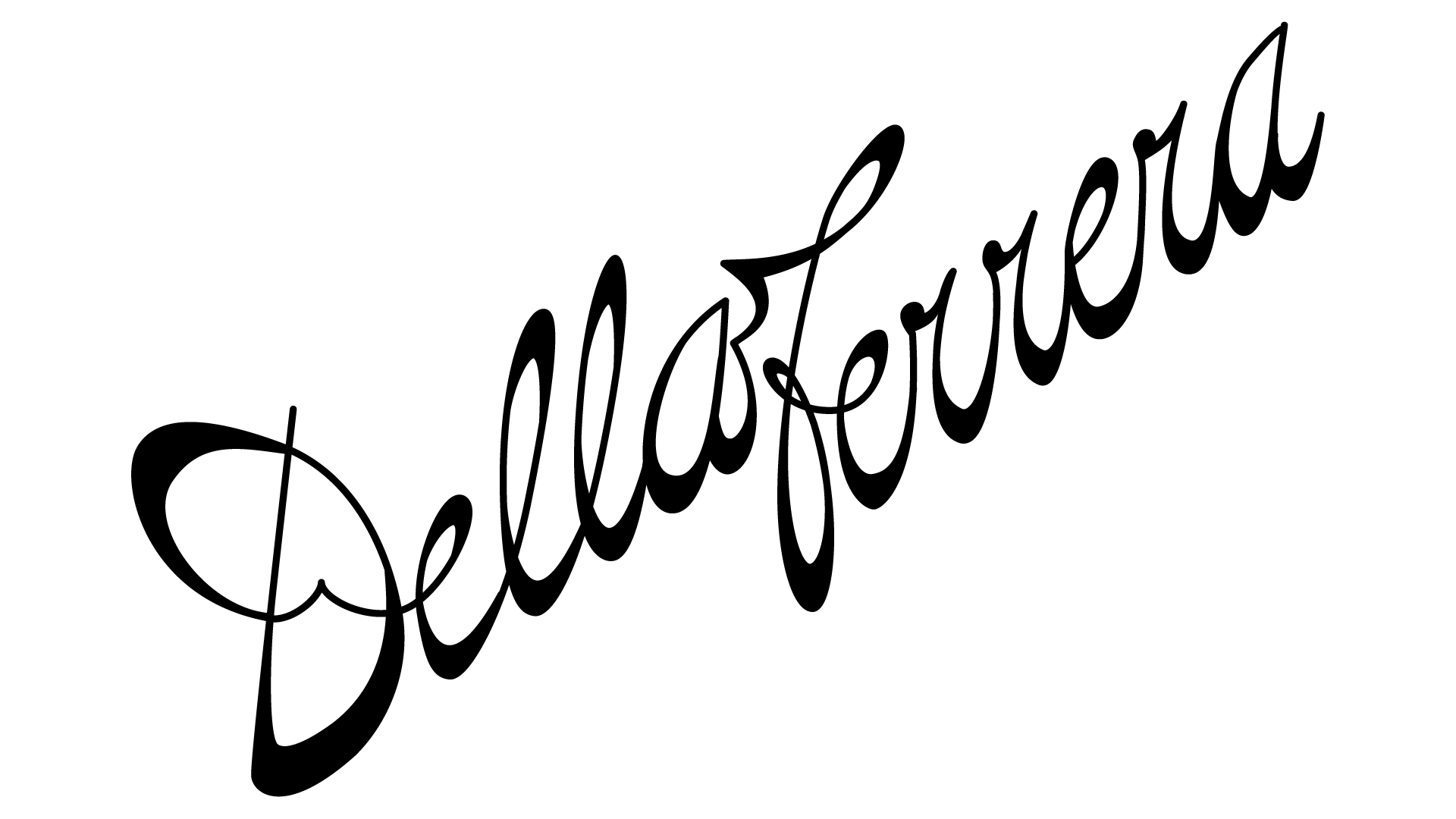
- Industry: Motorcycles
- Founded: 1909
- Headquarters: Turin, Italy
- Website: https://www.dellaferrera.com

Della Ferrera was an Italian motorcycle manufacturer active from 1909 to 1948. Four-valve motorcycles built by the company won events in the Trofeo Turistico Nazionale, at Cremona, and elsewhere. The company built a prototype for a cyclecar in 1924, the only model was a Cyclecar and was only produced in 1924. A four-cylinder two-stroke engine with a displacement of 707 cm^{3} provided the drive. The vehicle featured a four-speed gearbox and four-wheel brakes. The design-related top speed was given as 80 km/h. The Officine Meccanica Giuseppe Meldi took over the model in 1927 as the basis for its own vehicles.

From 1909, Della Ferrera was building a very sturdy Motorcycle that they were able to provide 100.000 km warranty. Until the 1st world-war, Della Ferrera was one of the primary Motorcycle makers in Italy. The Motorcycles were made by hand, which was more common at the time. Therefore, the number of motorcycles built was low. Most of the parts were made by the brothers Della Ferrera, except for the tires and parts of the ignition, including the carburetors.

== See also ==
- List of Italian companies
- List of motorcycle manufacturers
