= Aeromere/Capriolo =

Motorcycle company

Aeromere
- Founded: 1948 (motorcycle production)
- Headquarters: Trento, Italy
- Products: Motorcycles
- Parent: Aeromere (formerly Aero-Caproni)

Capriolo, later called Aeromere, was the name of the motorcycle production arm of the Italian aircraft company Aeromere or Aero-Caproni. After World War II, the victorious Allies prohibited wartime aircraft and other military hardware suppliers from remaining in their previous industries, and Aero-Caproni would change its name to Capriolo and become one of several, including Aermacchi, MV Agusta, Vespa and Ducati, that switched to producing motorcycles or scooters. These companies did well until the mid-1960s, when the advent of affordable cars like the Fiat 500 removed the economic barrier that kept many Italians relying on motorcycles for basic transportation. Capriolo was typical of those that could not survive the transformation to a more export-oriented industry, with the US as the most important market. Motorcycle production ran from 1947 or 1948 until 1964.

Some Capriolo engines featured the Küchen desmodromic valve system, and others used face-cams rather than the usual camshaft valve operation. Another Capriolo used a longitudinal flat twin, a layout not usually seen except on BMWs or BMW derivatives.

== See also ==
- List of Italian companies
- List of motorcycle manufacturers
