= Aldbert (motorcycle) =

Aldbert motorcycles were manufactured in Italy between 1953 and 1959, featuring 49cc to 173cc two-stroke engines and 173cc to 246cc four-stroke engines. The 175cc Razzo sports model had a four-speed gearbox and a top speed of 93 mph.

== See also ==
- List of Italian companies
- List of motorcycle manufacturers
