= Abbotsford motorcycles (UK 1919) =

UK historical motorcycle manufacturer

The Abbotsford was a scooter-like lightweight bike with a 1.5 bhp overhead valve engine. Production was limited.

== See also ==
- Abbotsford motorcycles
