= MAS (Milan) =

MAS was an Italian motorcycle manufacturer from 1920 until 1956.

MAS stood, in the context, for "Alberico Seiling Motorcycles" (Motocicli Alberico Seiling).

Seiling was an Italian constructor who developed a variety of motorbikes between 1920 and 1922, and in 1922 started commercial production. His 173 cc overhead valve (OHV) model with an external flywheel proved particularly popular. He also produced a single-cylinder 498 cc OHV model, and from 1928 a twin-cylinder model, also with 498 cc of displacement.

In 1937 an OLHV model with a special cylinder head appeared, with a vertically mounted camshaft, the cylinder valves set horizontally in a separate chamber above the combustion chamber. The combustion mixture was premixed in this separate chamber. By excluding the valves from the combustion chamber itself it was possible to use a 15:1 compression ratio which was by the standards of the time very high. The motor was not a success, however.

Seiling sold the MAS business to the Guidetti brothers in 1938. After this he continued to produce motor cycles in his own name (Seiling: A. Scoppio S.A.) and then, in 1939, he obtained finance to establish a new motorcycle manufacturing business under the name Altea. Altea produced a single-cylinder ohv 198 cc machine. However, this business ended in 1941 due to the general war which had by then broken out across most of Europe.

== See also ==
- List of Italian companies
- List of motorcycle manufacturers
