= Aetos (motorcycle) =

- Production: Pre-World War I
- Class: Motorcycle
- Engine: 492 cc 3.5 hp V-twin

Manufactured in Italy just prior to World War I, the Aetos was powered by a 492 cc 3.5 hp V-twin engine.

== See also ==
- List of Italian companies
- List of motorcycle manufacturers
