= Accossato =

Italian motorcycle part manufacturer

- Company type: Private
- Industry: Motorcycles; Motorcycle Parts
- Founded: 1976
- Founder: Giovanni Accossato
- Headquarters: Villastellone, Turin, Italy
- Website: www.accossato.com

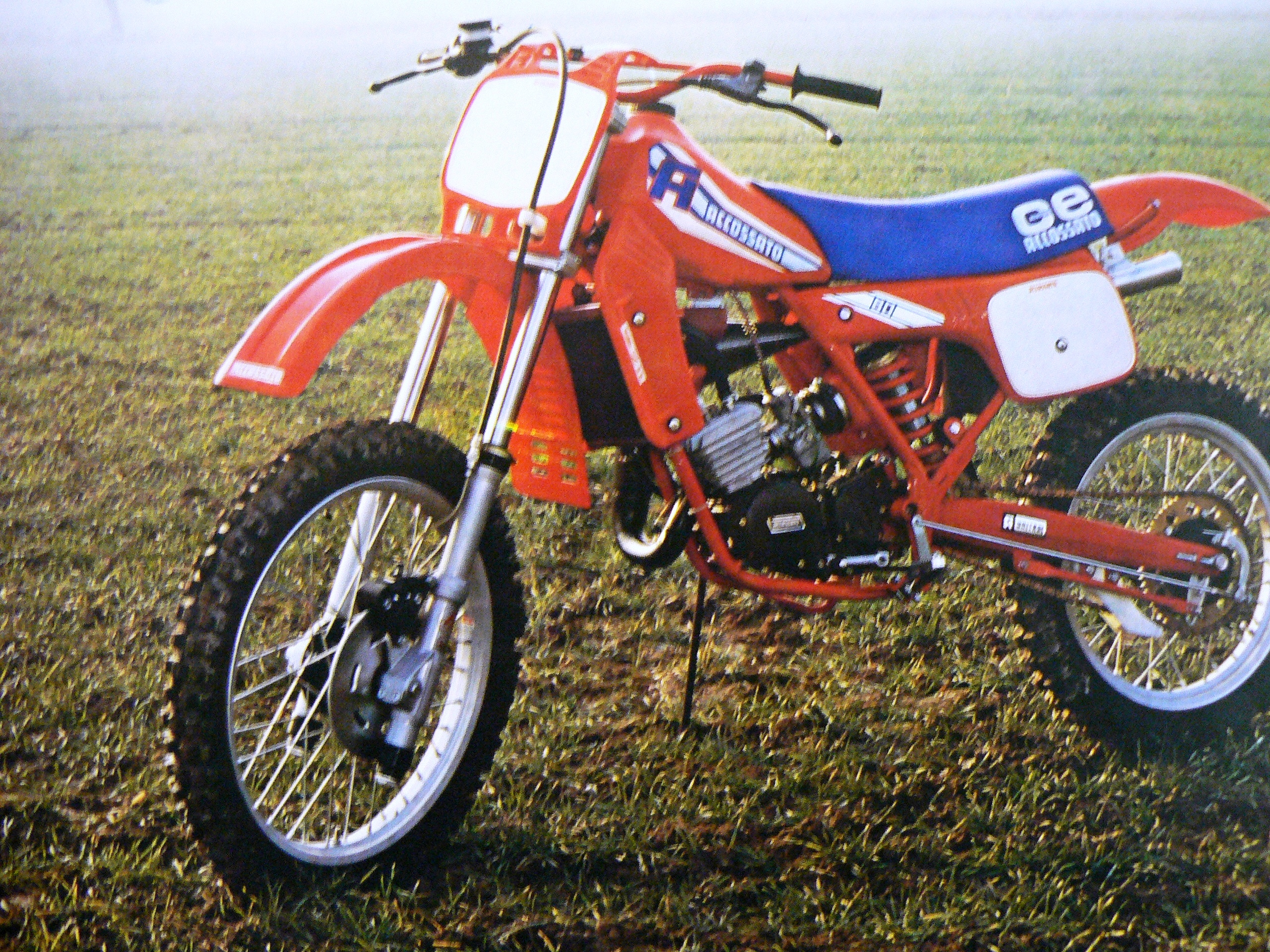
Accossato CE 80 Cross of 1985

The Accossato was a motorcycle manufactured at Turin, Italy between 1976 and 1990. Bikes were powered by 49cc, 79cc and 124cc Minarelli engines and were built for enduro, trials and motocross riders.

== See also ==
- List of Italian companies
- List of motorcycle manufacturers
