= Michael Hansson =

Michael Hansson may refer to:

- Michael Hansson (footballer) (born 1972), Swedish footballer
- Michael Hansson (judge) (1875–1944), Norwegian judge

== See also ==
- Michael Hanson (born c. 1930s–1940s), Hong Kong press secretary
- Mikael Hansson (born 1968), Swedish footballer
- Michael Hansen (disambiguation)
