= Askoll =

Italian electric vehicle manufacturer

Askoll EVA S.p.A.
- Type: Public
- Traded as: BIT: EVA
- Industry: E-mobility, motorcycle, bicycle, automotive,
- Founded: 2014
- Founder: Elio Marioni
- Headquarters: Dueville, Italy
- Area served: Europe, Israel
- Key people: Elio Marioni (Chairman) Alessandro Beaupain (Vice Chairman) Gian Franco Nanni (CEO)
- Products: e-scooters; e-bikes; electric components and kits
- Revenue: ▲€17.9 million (2021)
- Parent: Askoll Holding S.r.l.
- Website: askollelectric.com

Askoll EVA S.p.A. is an Italian manufacturer of two-wheeled electric vehicles for urban mobility. The Dueville based company produces e-bikes, electric scooters, components and kits. Askoll EVA is a subsidiary of Askoll Group, an Italian corporation specialized in manufacturing electric motors and drain pumps for washing machines, heating systems and other domestic appliances.

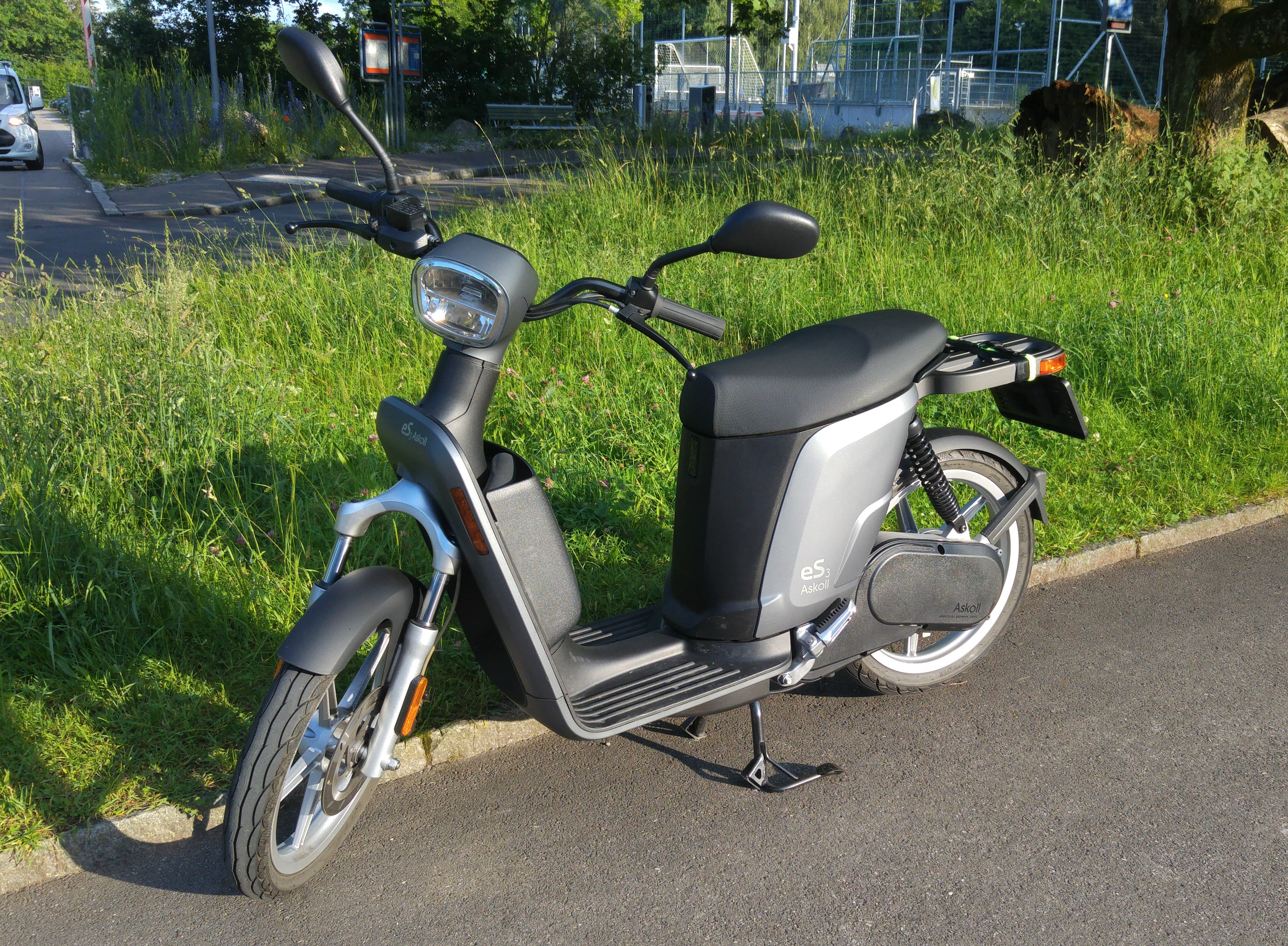
Askoll eS_{3} electric scooter, model year 2018

== History ==
Askoll EVA was founded in 2014 after two years of preparing development within Askoll Group. First e-bike and electric scooter models were launched in 2015. In 2016, the company presented a prototype for an electric microcar (Askoll Elò). The parent company sold a part of its main business in order to fund the EV activities.

In 2017, Askoll EVA entered the French market with an own branch and received an order from Austrian Post. That year, the company stopped its micro car project, started a collaboration with Italian scooter sharing provider MiMoto and launched two modified scooter models for professional delivery purposes (eS_{pro}).

In 2018, Askoll EVA went public (Alternative Investment Market AIM Italy). Furthermore, a partnership with Spanish scooter sharing provider Cooltra began. In 2019, a range of e-bike drive-trains for OEM markets was released.

In 2020, during the first months of the COVID-19 pandemic, Askoll EVA had to suspend business operations for six weeks following a lockdown order by the Italian government. As a result of the pandemic, business plummeted dramatically in the first half-year of 2020 (sales down 62%). In summer 2020, Askoll EVA launched its NGS scooter models, an evolution of the eS models with new design, quieter drive and bluetooth connectivity.

== Technology ==
- motor:
  - Askoll brushless electric motor, front- or rear-wheel drive (bikes)
  - Askoll brushless permanent magnet electric motor (scooters)
- batteries removable (bikes and scooters), lithium-ion cells (Samsung, Panasonic)
- power regeneration (scooters)
- transmission: belt drive (scooters)

== Scooter models (specs) ==
Model	Launch	Seats	Power (hp) (kW)	Max speed (km/h) (mph)	Battery (kWh)	Range^{1} (km) (mi)
eS_{2} 1.4 EVOlution	2022	2	3.0 2.2	45 28	1.4	42 26
eS_{2} 2.8 EVOlution	2022	2	3.0 2.2	45 28	2.8	81 50
eS_{3} 2.8 EVOlution	2022	2	3.7 2.7	66 41	2.8	87 54
NGS2 1.4	2022	2	3.0 2.2	45 28	1.4	42 26
NGS2 2.8	2022	2	3.7 2.7	45 28	2.8	87 54
NGS3 2.8	2022	2	3.7 2.7	66 41	2.8	87 54

^{1} according to ECE 168/2013

Purpose-built models (delivery):

Model	Launch	Seats	Power (hp) (kW)	Max speed (km/h) (mph)	Battery (kWh)	Range^{1} (km) (mi)
eS_{pro45} 1.4	2022	1	3.0 1.4	45 28	1.4	42 26
eS_{pro45} 2.8	2022	1	3.0 2,2	45 28	2.8	81 50
eS_{pro45K} 3.4	2022	1	3.7 2,7	45 28	3.4	95 59
eS_{pro70} 2.8	2022	1	3.7 2,7	66 41	2.8	87 54
eS_{pro70K} 2.8	2022	1	3.7 2,7	66 41	2.8	87 54

^{1} according to ECE 168/2013

== See also ==
- List of Italian companies
- List of motorcycle manufacturers
