= Bennett & Barkell Motorcycles =

- Company type: Privately held company
- Industry: Motorcycle
- Headquarters: Australia
- Products: Motorcycles

Bennett & Barkell or B & B motorcycles were manufactured in Australia from about 1910 to at least 1932 by Bennett & Barkell Ltd. of 234 Pitt Street, later 124-132 Castlereagh Street, and then the corner of Meagher and Chippen Streets, Sydney.

As was the case with most early Australian motorcycle companies, their machines were manufactured primarily from British parts. The B&B machines used JAP engines and Chater-Lea frames. They included 2.5 hp., 3.5 hp. 4 hp. (500cc), 6 hp. (770cc) and 8 hp. (1000cc) machines. Two piece tubular frame with engine as a stressed member. Used Druid forks and had large diameter (26 inch) wheels. Notable for a unique suspension system coupling the seat to the footboards (from ~1916).

In 1911 they asserted that the machine was built for Australian conditions with a key differentiating feature that they were "lighter in weight than the usual type of heavy-duty machine, but much heavier than the usual light-weight 90 or 100 lb. motor cycle". They further asserted that "the frame is scientifically constructed, too, and though lighter in weight than many higher-powered machines, will stand a greater road strain". This machine had a JAP engine of just 2.5 hp however "owing to the light construction of the frame it accomplishes as much as, if not more, than the cycles which are encumbered with a superfluous amount of metal".

From ~1916, B&B offered, as an option on the larger models, a patented suspension mechanism involving a sprung seat pillar; the "B. & B. Spring Frame Attachment".

In 1917, advertising promoted the combination of Australian Workmanship and English Material, together with success in the NSW Motor Cycle Club's Reliability Trial on 9 June 1917.
