= Abbotsford motorcycles =

Motorcycle production in the UK

- Company type: Privately held company
- Industry: Motorcycle
- Founder: G.W.Revell
- Headquarters: Abbotsford, Victoria, Australia
- Products: Motorcycles

Abbotsford motorcycles were manufactured by G.W.Revell of 301 Victoria Street, Abbotsford, Victoria, Australia in 1912 and 1913.

== See also ==
- Abbotsford motorcycles (UK 1919)
