= Aussi Also =

Failed Australian motorcycle manufacturing operation

The Aussi Also was a failed attempt to start a large-scale motorcycle manufacturing operation in Melbourne, Victoria just after the end of World War I.

== Prototype ==
The Russell, Walsh & Hitchcock company had previously been in the metal trade, making fuel tanks, mudguards and other parts for both motorcycles and motor cars. By the end of 1919, William and Isaac Walsh had built a prototype motorcycle, powered by a 3.5 hp two-stroke engine. The bike was found to be underpowered, due to lack of crankcase compression. The brothers also built at least two 7-9 hp V-twin engined bikes for racing and publicity purposes.

== Company created ==
In May 1920 the Aussi Also Motors & Manufacturing Company Ltd was created for volume production. Advertising suggested that a large, modern factory and substantial workforce were ready for production. In reality, the workshop was a dirty, dark ex-smelting and tinsmith shop with little equipment.

== Pricing ==
Prices for the four planned models were as follows:

- 65 pounds – single cylinder two-stroke
- 65 pounds – twin cylinder four-stroke
- 95 pounds – twin-cylinder two-stroke
- 110 pounds – twin-cylinder four-stroke

An innovative feature was that the rear wheel could be replaced by a fly wheel, thus making the motorcycle a stationary engine.

== Production claims ==
The company claimed that by June 1920 it had 40 bikes in various stages of construction, and that the factory could turn out 25 bikes a month, with a workforce of approximately 50 employees.

== Company failure ==
Serious production never took place, due to negative publicity regarding the failings of the prototype. William Marsh advertised the prototypes for sale, while Isaac returned to the family farm at Kilmany.
