= Gima (motorcycles) =

- Founded: 1947, resumed 2005
- Defunct: 1956
- Headquarters: Peschadoires, France
- Products: Motorcycles
- Website: Official page

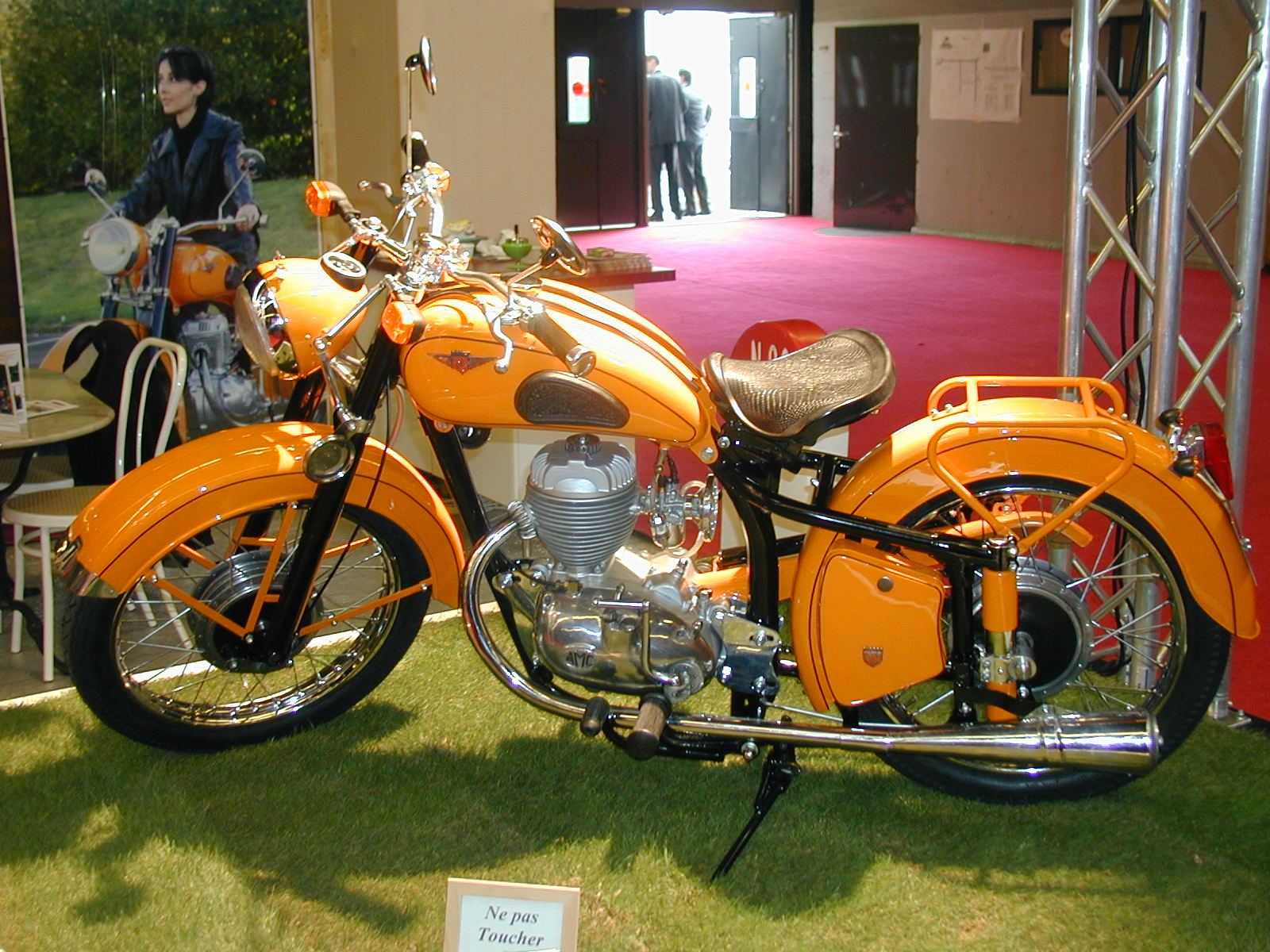
Example of an old-style new GIMA

GIMA (Groupement Industriel Métallurgique Automobile) is a French motorcycle manufacturer that built lightweight bikes from 1947 until 1956. It resumed production in 2005 with the production of modern retro reincarnation of the original 1950s bikes, but compliant with modern standards. On February 27, 2009, the company benefited from a safeguard procedure, which was unfortunately converted into a judicial liquidation on February 19, 2010. On March 21, 2012, GIMA filed for bankruptcy and was struck off the register of companies.
