= Juery =

Juéry is a former French motorcycle and bicycle manufacturer based in Paris. Founded by Charles Juéry and active in the 1930s to the 1960s, it specialized in motorized and pedal powered tricycles known as "triporteurs" in France, designed for transporting goods.
