= Maratos =

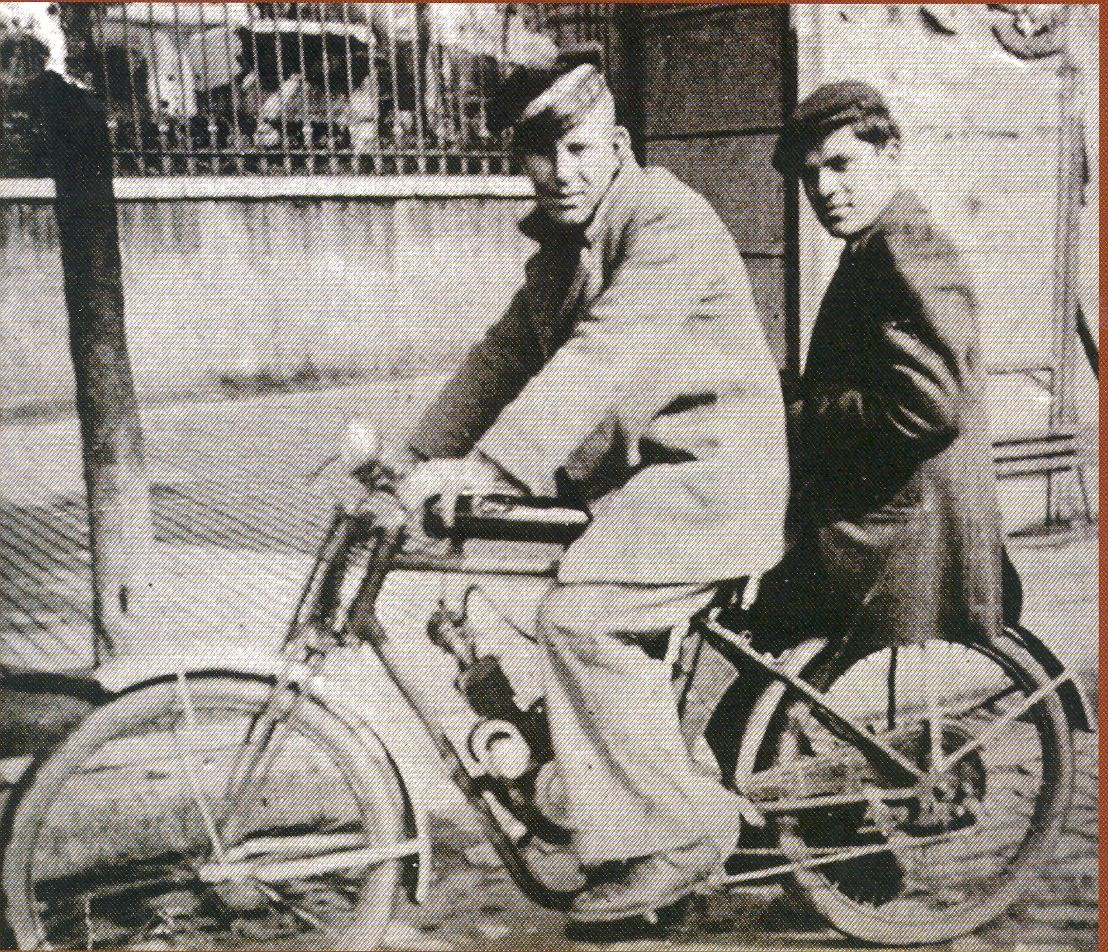
Maratos brothers on a bicycle

The Greek Maratos Brothers' have built a small number of vehicles in Thessaloniki. These include a rather innovative motorcycle in 1950, as well as two light three wheeler types.

The Maratos family spread throughout Greece and some now live in Victoria in Australia.
