= Havoc Motorcycles =

Canadian Motorcycle Manufacturer

Havoc Motorcycles is a Canadian motorcycle manufacturer that produces custom luxury performance cruisers and electric sport motorcycles.

== History ==
Havoc Motorcycles was founded in Prince Edward Island in 2014. The company's launch was announced in September 2015 with the launch of its first prototype model, the "Iron Flight: Mike Tyson Special Edition" a themed motorcycle featuring graphics licensed from Mike Tyson, entertainer and former heavyweight boxing champion.

In 2016, Havoc Motorcycles formed a partnership with the Wild West Motor Co., an established United States manufacturer of hand-built motorcycles in operation since 1987, for technology transfer and licensing of high-horsepower street motorcycle designs. The Wild West Gunfire, a dragster-inspired motorcycle, formed the basis for two of Havoc Motorcycles' next models, and companies cooperated in the launch of the Havoc 124SS that was unveiled in February 2017.

In 2018, the company received Ministerial Authorization from Transport Canada to use the National Safety Mark, certifying that its motorcycles met federal safety standards. It also joined the Canadian Vehicle Manufacturer’s Association and secured its own WMI code. Their motorcycles were then added to the Insurance Bureau of Canada database, making registration and insurance as straightforward as any major-brand manufacturer.

In 2019 the company introduced the Havoc 127 VooDoo, a cruiser with 1960s retro styling.

In 2025, Havoc Motorcycles announced a new line of electric sport motorycles, the Havoc Enforce.
