= Santamaria (motorcycles) =

Santamaria Motorcycles
- Industry: Motorcycle
- Founded: 1951 Novi Ligure, Italy
- Defunct: 1963

Santamaria was a company in North-West Italy producing motor bikes with 49cc, 69cc, 98cc, 123cc and 147cc engines produced by Franco Morini, JLO, Minarelli, Sachs, Zundapp.

== Models produced (incomplete) ==
- Tigrotto
- Tigrotto Sport
