= Windhoff motorcycle =

Early 20th century German motorcycle manufacturer

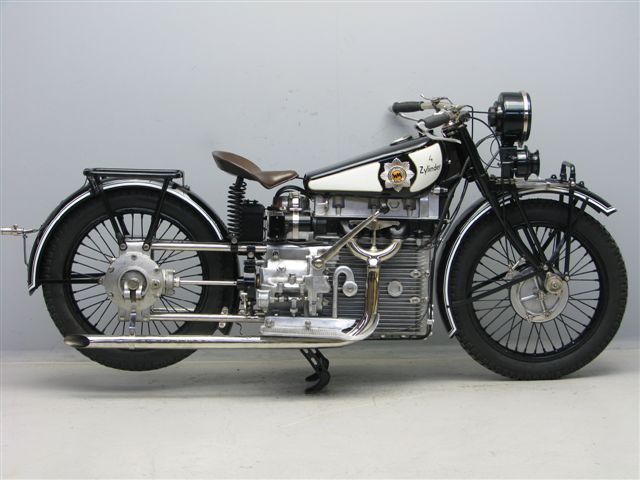
The 750cc Windhoff OHC 4-cylinder built from 1928 to 1931

Windhoff motorcycles were built by Windhoff Motorenbau GmbH in Berlin, Germany from 1924 to 1933.

== Production ==
=== Start of production ===
The factory was located at Bülowstrasse 106, Berlin W57 (Prussia), under the direction of factory owner Hans Windhoff. Windhoff initially produced radiators for cars, trucks, and aircraft, setting up a factory with his brother Fritz in Rheine in 1902, then on his own in Berlin from 1907 to 1924. In 1924, he entered the burgeoning German motorcycle market with a water-cooled two-stroke of 125cc. The engine was built under license from a design by Hugo Ruppe, whose ladepumpe (an extra piston used as a supercharger to compress the fuel/air mix) design was used most successfully by DKW in their Grand Prix racers. Windhoff had much racing success with these small two-strokes, although an experiment with enlarged two-stroke racers of 493cc and 517cc were less reliable.

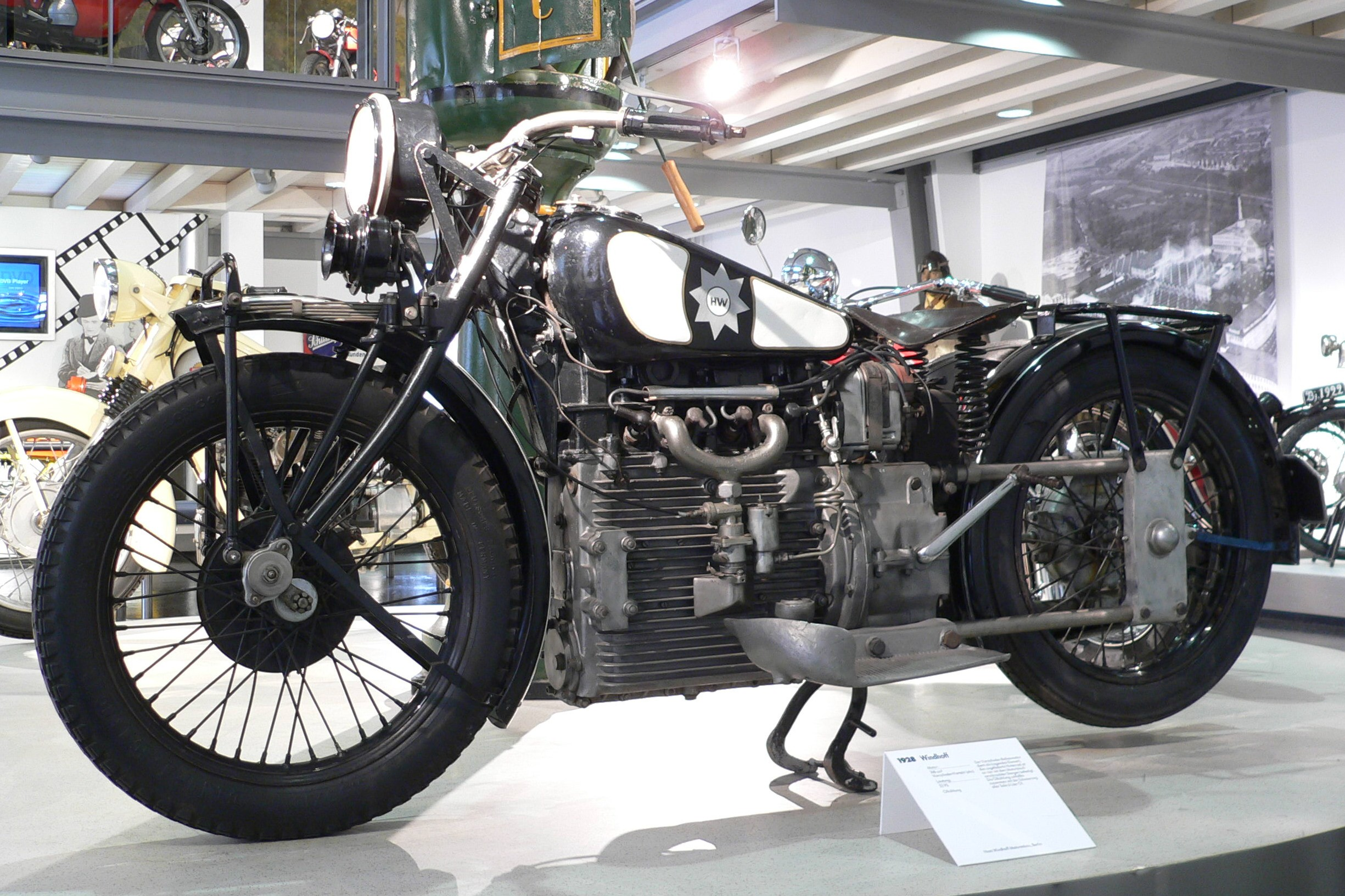
The carburetor side of the Windhoff 750cc-4

=== New design ===
In 1926, a totally new machine was designed; a dramatic and technically fascinating 746cc overhead camshaft, oil-cooled 4-cylinder. Only Granville Bradshaw (creator of the ABC motorcycle) had successfully used an oil-cooled engine in a motorcycle. The engine, designed by Ing. Dauben (who later joined Mercedes on the W144 - W146 racers) had no external oilways, making a very clean design.

The engine finning acted as a giant radiator, with recirculating oil the cooling agent. The single overhead camshaft was driven by a train of gears at the front of the engine. Very few 4-cylinder production motorcycles of the pre-War period had an overhead camshaft (notable examples were the first iteration of the Ariel Square Four of 1931 and the Danish Nimbus of 1934). The 63x60mm short-stroke engine produced 22 hp at 4,000rpm, which gave an 80 mph+ top speed. The Windhoff chassis had no ‘frame’ to speak of, and the engine/gearbox unit was used as a stressed member, with the forks and rear subframe (4 parallel tubes) bolt directly onto it. The trailing-link forks use double leaf springs for damping, with no rear suspension; the rear frame tubes emerge straight out of the gearbox casting, and hold the final drive housing for the shaft drive, and rear hub and brake.

Despite its massive appearance, the total weight of the machine was only 440 lbs. The price when new was 1,750DM, a bit more than the contemporary 750cc BMW R63 (1,600DM).

=== End of production ===
Hans Windhoff designed a new machine for 1929, with a side valve flat-twin motor of 996cc, but the economic Crash of 1929 meant very few were produced. Windhoff struggled on with small two-stroke motorcycles of 298cc, with engines produced under license from Villiers. The company ceased operations by 1933.
