= Dat Bike =

Vietnamese electric motorbike manufacturer

- Founded: 2019
- Founder: Son Nguyen
- Headquarters: Da Nang, Vietnam

Dat Bike is a Vietnamese electric motorbike manufacturer. Founded in 2019 by Son Nguyen, Dat Bike operates stores in Ho Chi Minh City, Hanoi and Da Nang. In 2023, Dat Bike announced a ride-hailing partnership with Gojek. Dat Bike launched its Weaver motorbike model in 2019, followed by the Weaver 200 in 2021.
