= Megelli Motorcycles =

British motorcycle manufacturer

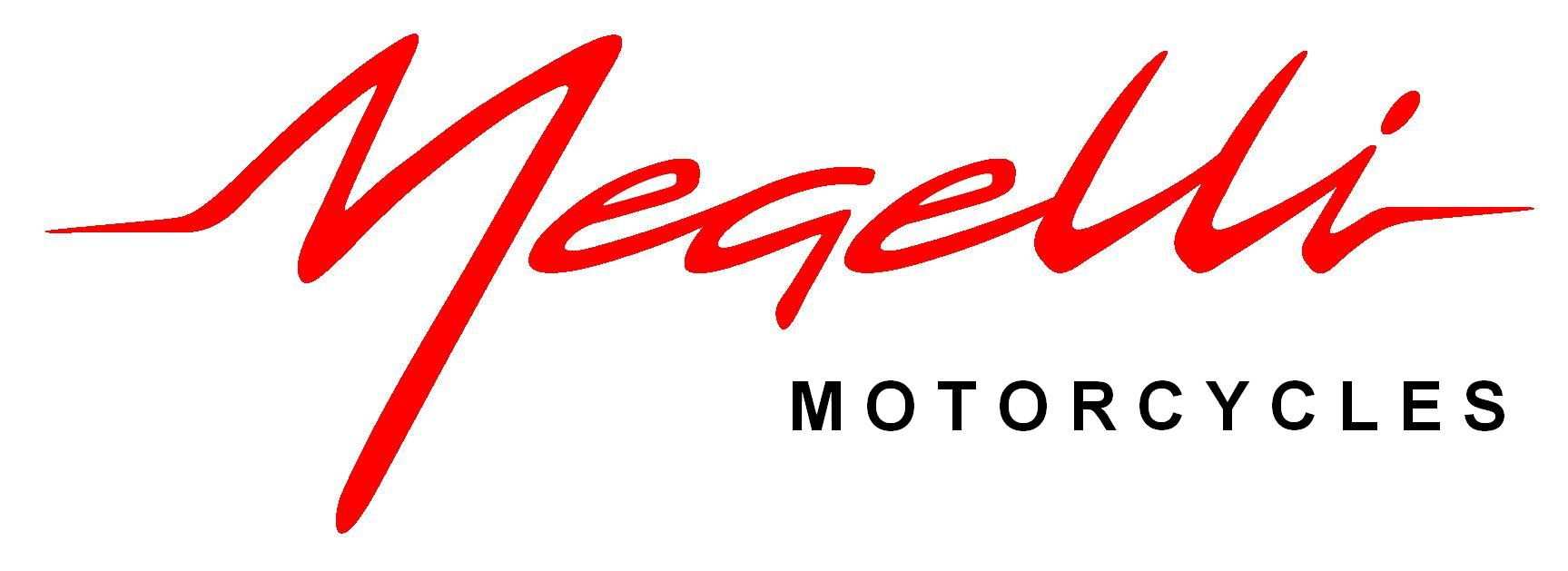
- Company type: Private
- Founded: 2004
- Defunct: 2014
- Headquarters: North Hykeham, Lincoln, United Kingdom
- Key people: Barry Hall
- Products: Motorcycles
- Website: www.megelli.com

Megelli Motorcycles was a British motorcycle manufacturer, which made its debut at the Milan EICMA exhibition in November 2007.

Megelli motorcycles was founded by the managing director of Sports and Leisure Direct UK Ltd, Barry Hall, who previously specialised in off-road Aeon all-terrain vehicles, mini bikes and pit bikes. The Megelli range is currently sold in 37 countries in Europe, Asia, Australia, Africa, North America and South America.

Megelli's manufacturing agreement with Huansong Industries (group) Co Limited Hsun ended on 31 December 2013.

== Development ==
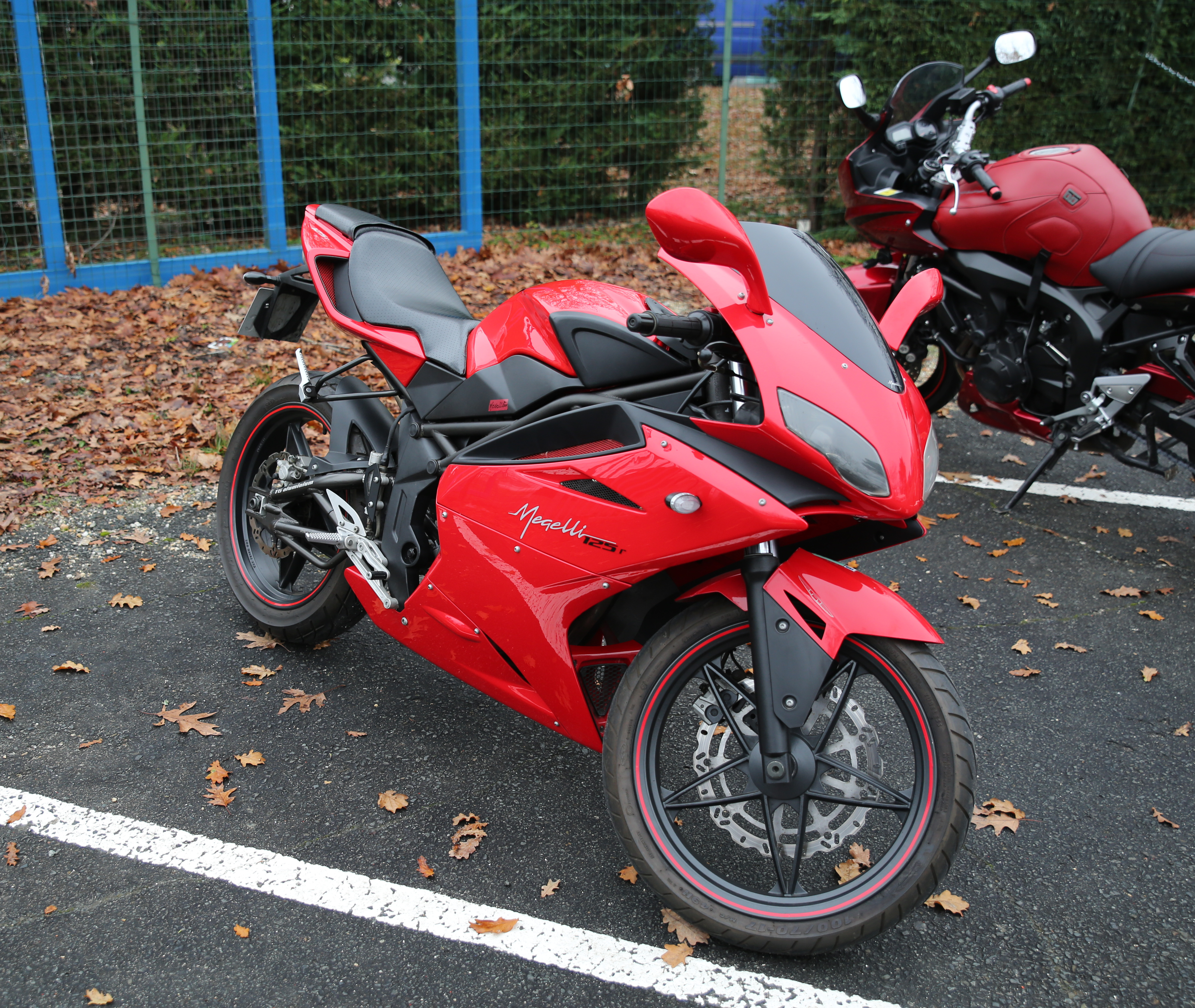
Megelli 125R

Barry Hall's access to specialist 'virtual' motorcycle design centres and established UK vehicle production and engineering facilities enabled the company to progress from the initial vision to production of motorcycles in three years. The original design sketches for the launch models were produced in July 2005 and test production began in September 2007. By December 2007 the range was on sale worldwide. Megelli Motorcycles are designed and engineered in the UK using custom tooling for the majority of components, with final assembly in China. Approximately 75% of the components are from Taiwanese companies. This includes the engines with high specification ceramic coated cylinders from SYM, and KOSO instruments panel. The main frame, swingarm, sub frame and engine cradle, and all forged components are also from Taiwanese companies.

== Model range ==
=== 125 cc ===
There were three 125 cc bikes in the Megelli motorcycle range, all featuring the same 125 cc, 11 kW (15 bhp), four-stroke engine, under seat exhaust and frame. Available models are 125R, 125M and 125S.

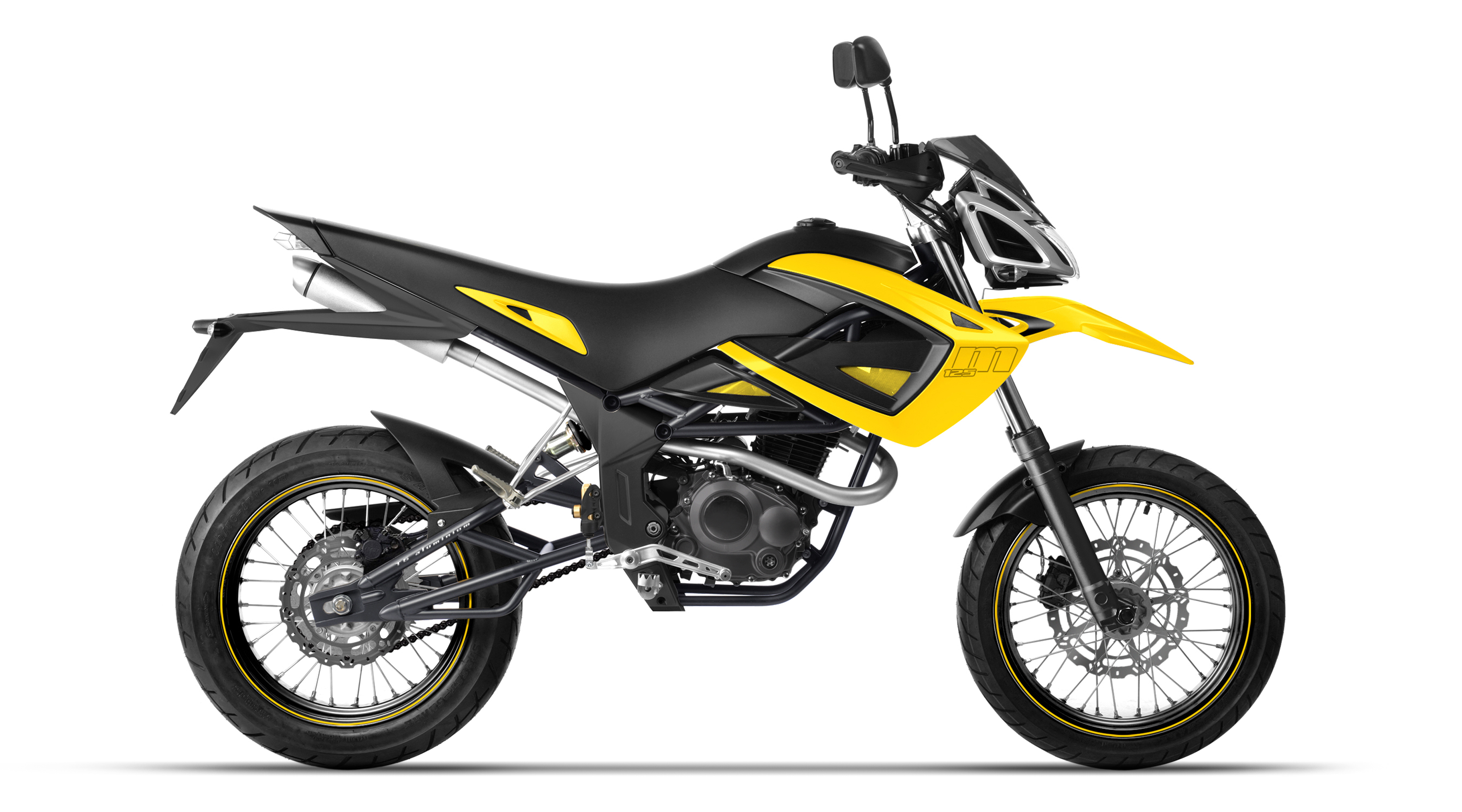
Megelli 125M

The 125M Motard was a supermoto-styled road bike. It has a seat height of 860 mm (34 in) and a wheelbase of 1,400 mm (55 in), longer and higher than either of the two others, due to the length of the suspension and shocks.

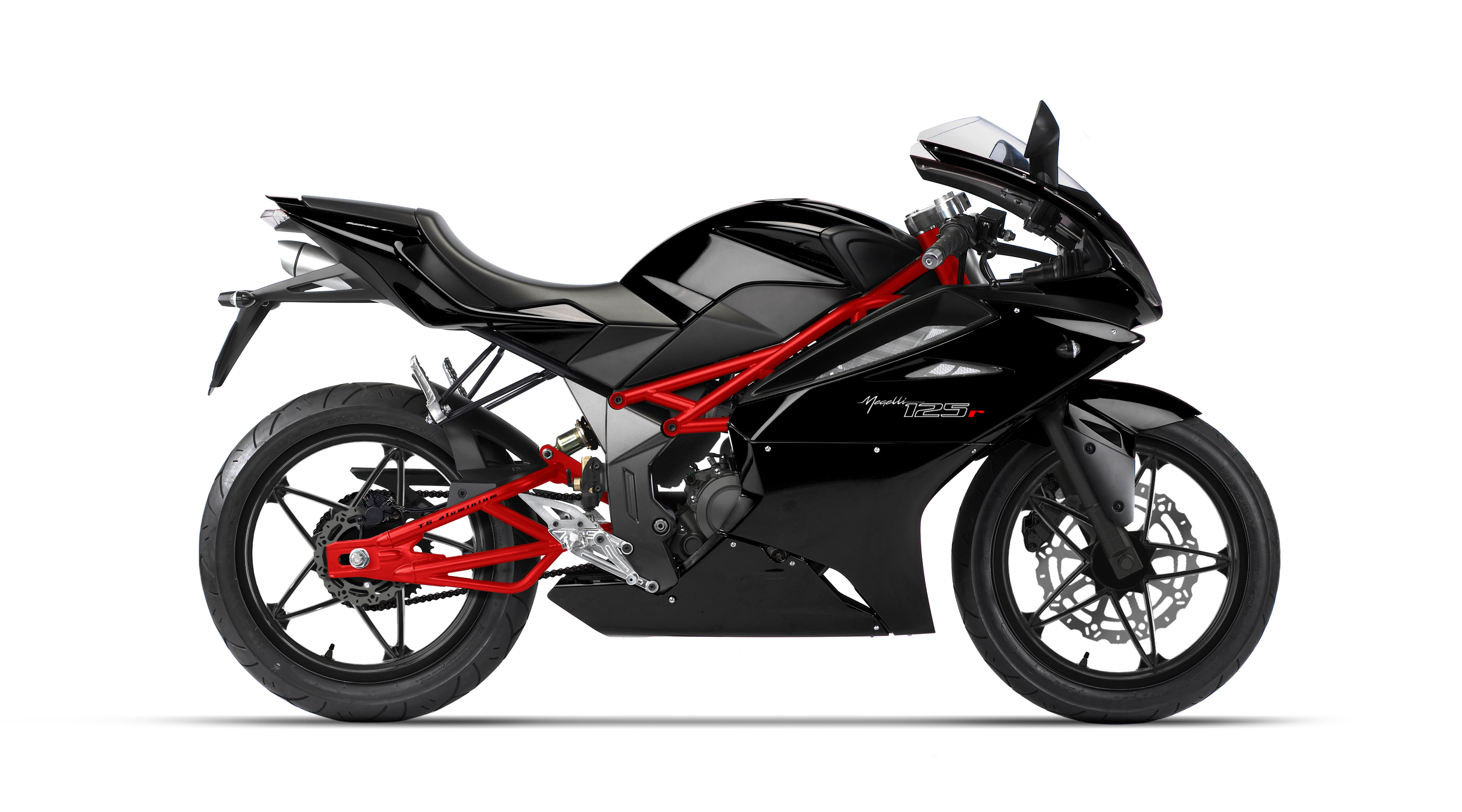
Megelli 125R

Then there was the racing-styled 125R, full faired with a split twin headlamp assembly. Seat height: 800 mm (31 in). Wheelbase: 1,349.6 mm (53.13 in).

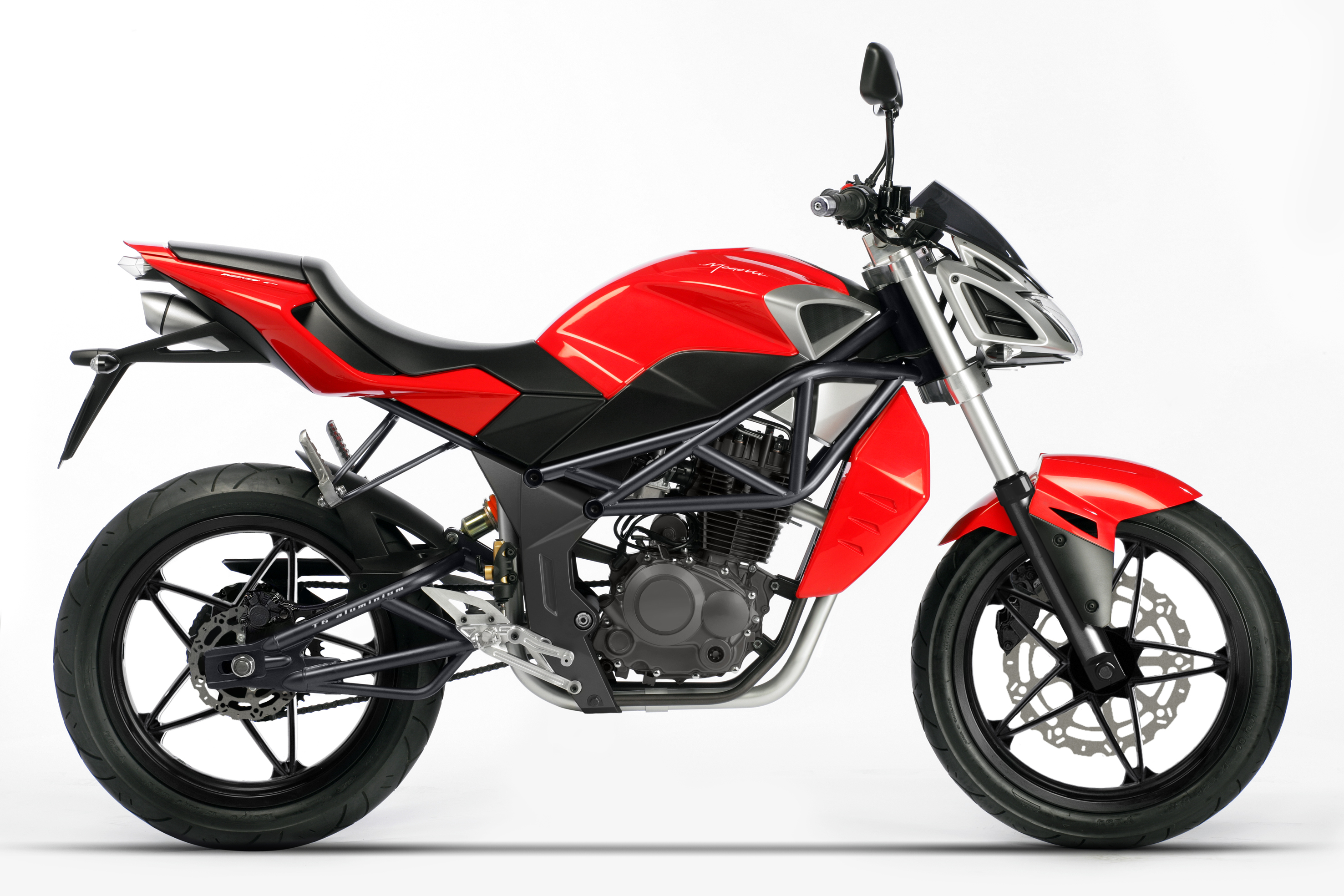
Megelli 125S

Finally, the Naked 125S version was almost identical to the 125R, albeit with significantly less aero parts and a single front headlight assembly. Seat height: 800 mm (31 in). Wheelbase: 1,349.6 mm (53.13 in).

=== 250 cc ===
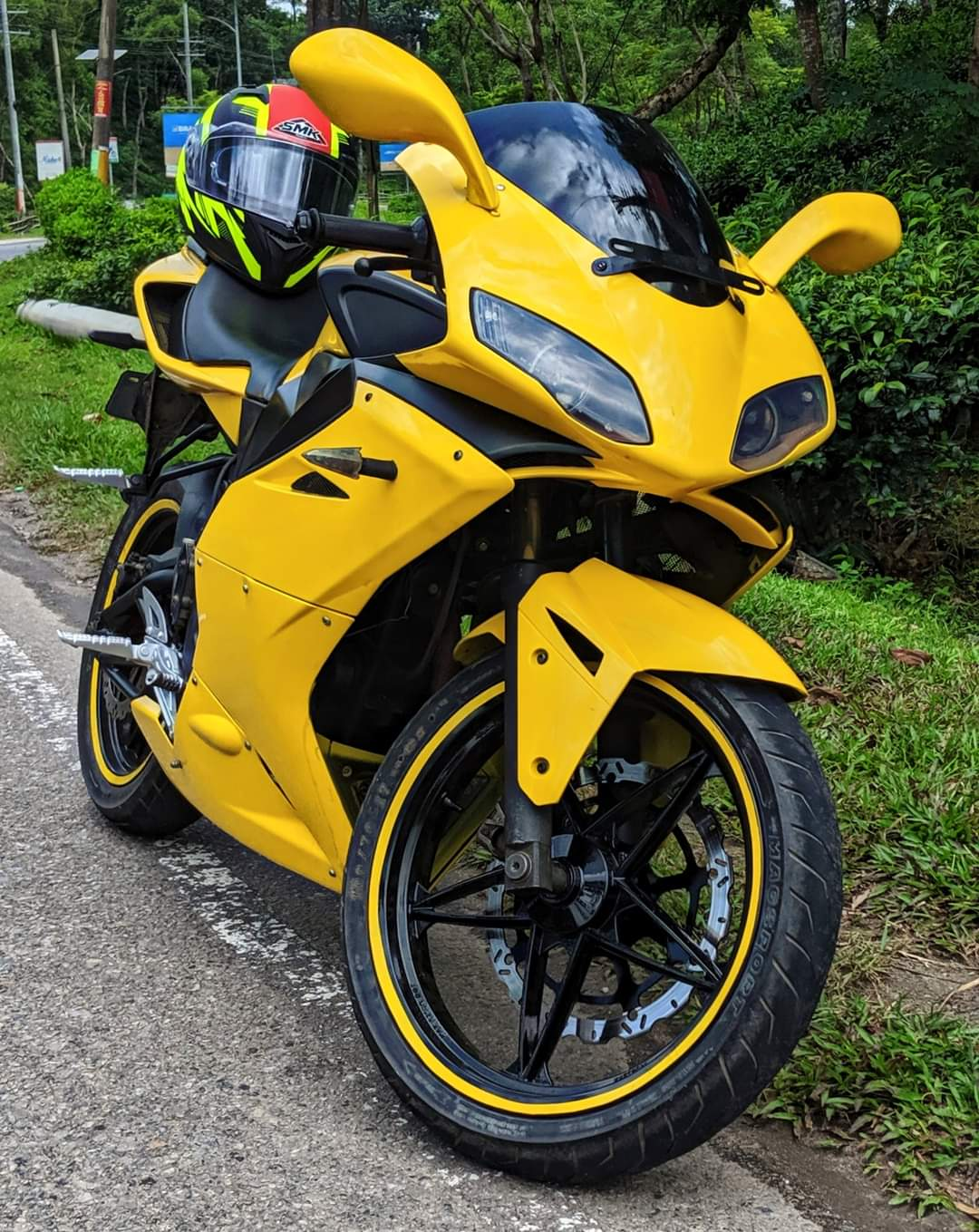
Megelli 250R

Megelli has finished working on a 250 cc engine for the American, Asia and Australian markets. The bore and stroke were increased from 56.5 mm × 49.5 mm (2.22 in × 1.95 in) to 65.5 mm × 68 mm (2.58 in × 2.68 in). Keeping the single-cylinder four-stroke design, horsepower was increased from 11 hp to around 26 hp. Weight was increased from 110 to 112.5 kg (243 to 248 lb). Like the 125 cc bikes, the 250 is available in the same three configurations: 250M, 250R and 250S.

== Specification ==
All three 250 cc models share the same four-stroke single cylinder engine with a compression of 10:1, DENI carburettor and CDI ignition. Drive is via a six-speed gearbox and it has electric start and disc brakes. The bike features a 4-valve OHC 26 HP single cylinder engine, an aluminium multi twin spar trellis frame and T6 aluminium trellis swing-arm. The suspension consists of a telescopic front fork with aluminium dropouts and a mono pre-load adjustable rear suspension.
