= SIS (motorbikes) =

SIS was an important Portuguese motorbike and moped manufacturer, based in Anadia. In addition to motorbikes it produced light three-wheeler pickup trucks (a type of vehicle once very popular, especially in Southern European countries). Its products used Sachs engines and were quite successful in the local market, especially in the 1970s. SIS Sachs exported to USA, Germany, Austria, Greece, Morocco, Angola and Mozambique. The most iconic model was the SIS Sachs V5 produced from 1965 until the 1980s with several upgrades and different versions.

Due to the growing competition of manufacturers from Asia, SIS had to close business in September 1995.

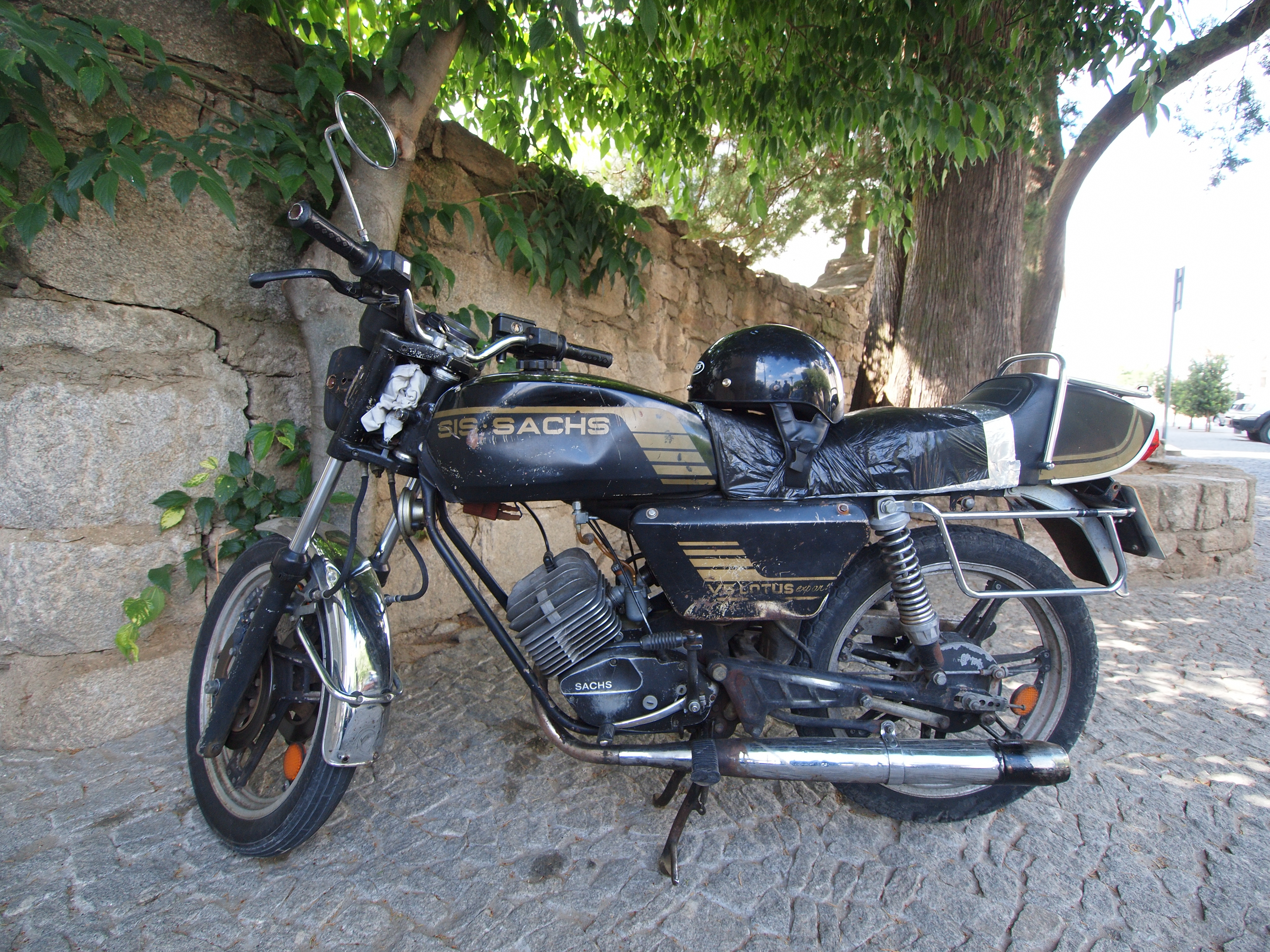
SIS Sachs model V5 Lotus
