= Abe-Star =

Japanese motorcycle model

The Abe-Star was a Japanese motorcycle built between 1951 and 1958. The top model was a 148cc four-stroke engine with the company's own overhead valve engine.
