= Nougier =

Nougier was a brand of French hand built road racing motorcycles made by Jean Nougier from 1937 to 1972.

Entirely hand-built, the engines were dual overhead camshaft unit with hairpin valve springs, which remained popular on racing engines since due to their ease of replacement. The motorcycles had maximum power at 10,000rpms, rear suspension (rare for the time), and a forward mounted rear brake.
