= Ackland Motorcycles Co =

British motorcycle manufacturer, 1919–1924

- Industry: Motorcycle manufacture
- Founded: 1919 in Southampton, England
- Founder: William Charles Ackland
- Defunct: 1924

The Ackland Motorcycles Co was a British motorcycle manufacturer. The company was founded by William Charles Ackland (1871–1942) in 1895 and originally manufactured cycles. The company was located on St. Mary's Road in Southampton. Ackland's son William George Ackland (1903–1994) later joined the company.

== Motorcycle production ==
In 1919 Ackland started producing motorcycles. He used proprietary components from suppliers for the hubs, engine and gearbox. Whilst most similar manufacturers chose two-stroke engines from Villiers Engineering, Ackland used the more expensive, heavy-duty V-twins from JA Prestwich Industries (J.A.P.). Production lasted from 1919 to 1924, although bicycle production continued until 1936.

A restored 1922 example is on display at Southampton Museum. This particular machine has a 680 cc JAP engine, a Sturmey Archer 3 speed box and carbide lighting.
