= Renard (motorcycle) =

Estonian motorcycle brand

- Industry: Motorcycle manufacturer
- Founded: 1938 in Tallinn, Estonia
- Founder: J. Lään
- Headquarters: Tallinn, Estonia
- Website: renardmotorcycles.com

Renard is a motorcycle manufacturer in Estonia. The brand was founded in 1938 by J. Lään and was based in Tallinn.

== Early production ==
Renard produced lightweight motorcycles from 1938. "Renard" is French for fox, and a fox's head was used as the brand's logo. The first models had a 98cc Sachs two-stroke engine, and had an appearance similar to a Wanderer motorcycle. They were finished in black with gold coach-lines. In March 1944, when the country was occupied by Nazi Germany, during a bombing raid by the Soviets, the factory suffered a direct hit and was destroyed. Production never started again. No examples of the machines exist, but frame no. 2 from 1938 frame survives.

== 2008 revival ==
In 2008, a number of Estonian engineers and business people, led by Andres Uibomäe, decided to revive the brand. In April 2010, a prototype of a new motorcycle was presented at the Hanover Technology Fair: the Renard Grand Tourer. This has a 125hp longitudinal eight-valve Moto Guzzi V-twin as power source. The machine had a very modern design, with a carbon fiber/Kevlar monocoque frame and a trailed swing front fork with a single, central coil spring. The first production bike was delivered in September 2015. Production is around 100 units a year.
