= Cofersa =

Spanish motorcycle manufacturer

Cofersa, acronym for Construcciones Ferrusola S.A., was a Spanish motorcycle manufacturer between 1954 and 1962, using Hispano-Villiers engines of 125 and 200cc.

== Origins ==
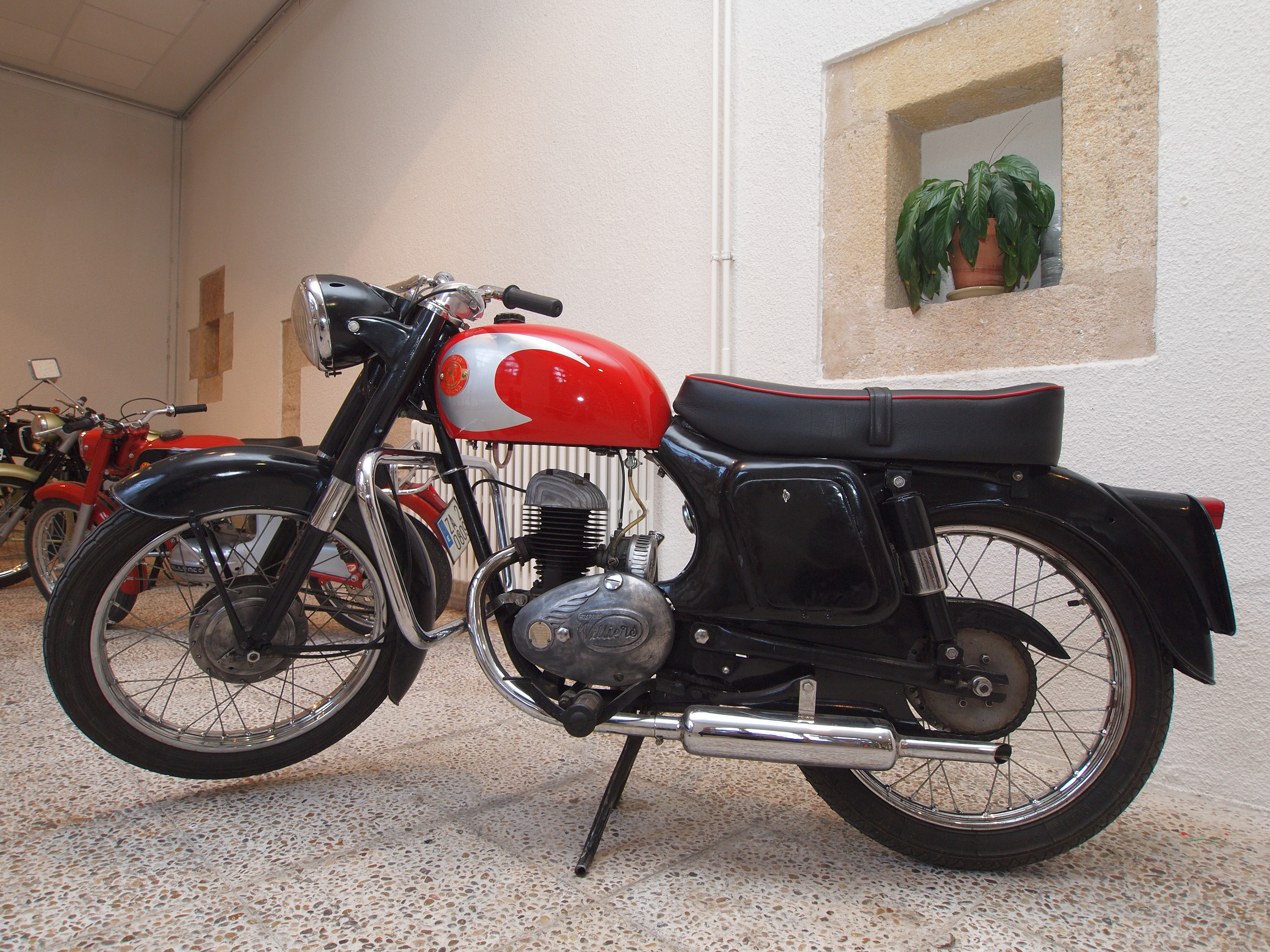
200cc Cofersa (1955)

José Mercader, the manufacturer, had begun building auxiliary engines to install on bicycles. With this experience, he created Construcciones Ferrusola SA in 1953, to undertake the manufacture of motorcycles in Madrid.

== Motorcycles ==
The first unit was put on sale in 1954, a 125cc model, emphasizing their functionality and quality of construction. Mechanical durability was ensured by the incorporation of Hispano-Villiers (Villiers manufactured under license in Spain) engines. With a conventional design, the make was highlighted by the robustness.

During the first year the company produced only a hundred motorcycles, but in a short time the staff of employees exceeded the number of 100, to meet the demand.

The JM model appeared in 1957, incorporating stamped sheet metal and four-speed gearbox. In 1959 the model Helix went on sale, with stamped metal construction again, and a protective grid on the rear fenders, probably to make it easier for women to sit aside on the motorcycle without the skirts been tangled with rear wheel.

As a manufacturer of motorcycles, Cofersa activity ceased in 1962.
