= Delta-Gnom =

- Founded: 1923
- Defunct: 1955
- Fate: defunct
- Headquarters: Vienna, Austria
- Products: Motorcycles

Delta-Gnom was an Austrian manufacturer founded in 1923 producing J.A.P.-engined motorcycles until the early 1930s. Production resumed after World War II using Rotax engines, until 1955.
