= Hunter Motorcycles =

Australian motorcycle brand

- Company type: Private
- Industry: Motorcycle
- Headquarters: Perth, Western Australia
- Products: Motorcycles, Clothing, ride wear, Accessories

Hunter Motorcycles Worldwide is an Australian motorcycle brand specialising in low-to-high capacity street and tourer style bikes. The first Hunter Motorcycle was approved for sale in Australia by the Department of Infrastructure in 2007. In 2017 Hunter Motorcycles were also approved for sale in Nepal and Indonesia.

== History ==
Hunter Motorcycles was started with an intention to fill a niche for good looking learner street bikes. The founder started the company as his own children came of riding age, realising there was little choice of learner-specific bikes on the market. In 2014 the company was bought out by Hunter distributor Ben Namnik and the headquarters were moved from New South Wales to Western Australia.

In 2017 Hunter Motorcycles expanded into Nepal, New Zealand, Malaysia, Iran and Indonesia.

== Model Range ==
There are six models in the Hunter Motorcycles range:

1. Spyder 350cc
2. Bobber 350cc
3. Cruiser 250 & 350cc
4. Cafe Racer 350cc
5. Daytona 350cc
6. Sniper TT350X

In 2017 the concept "Hollister" model was featured in Ben Bullock's From Perth to Perth ride. The bike was donated to the charity by Hunter Motorcycles. The Hollister is soon to be released in Australia along with rumours of another model to follow.
