= TIZ (motorcycle) =

Soviet motorcycle manufacturer

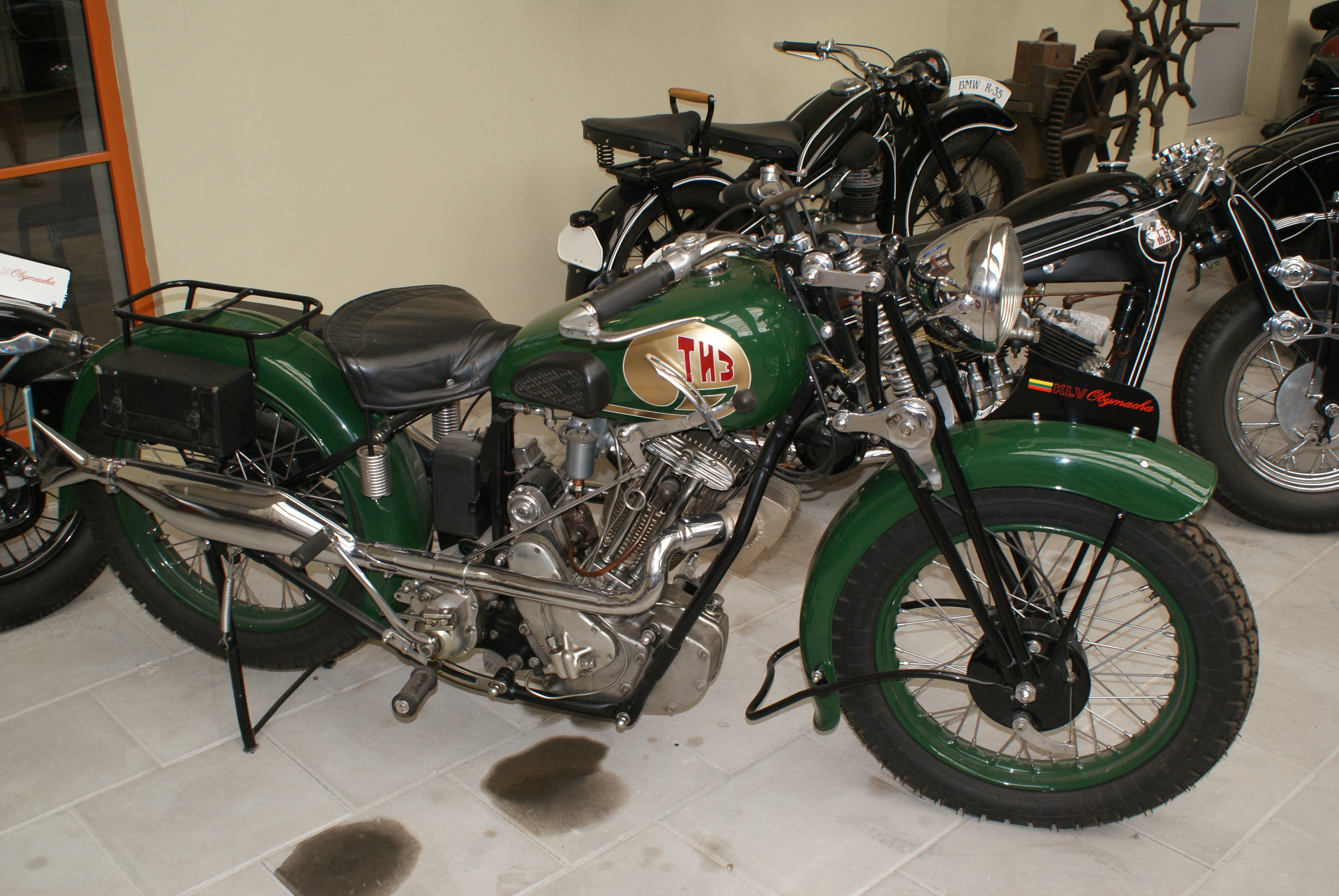
TIZ AM-600 motorcycle in Vilnius Energy and Technology Museum

TIZ (ТИЗ; Russian: Таганрогский инструментальный завод No. 65 им. т. Сталина, lit. 'Taganrogskiy Instrumentalniy Zavod No. 65 named after Stalin') was a motorcycle manufacturer.

Following the German Invasion of the Soviet Union, the plant was transferred east to the town of Tyumen in the Ural region and became known as TMZ (ТМЗ; Russian: Тюменский мотоциклетный завод, romanized: Tyumenskiy Mototsikletniy Zavod).

== History ==
In 1936 the plant commenced building the TIZ-AM-600 (Army Motorcycle), a Soviet copy of the BSA 1931 Sloper 600. With the German Invasion of the Soviet Union, the plant was transferred east to the town of Tyumen in the Ural region. The new plant was known as TMZ (ТМЗ; Russian: Тюменский мотоциклетный завод, romanized: Tyumenskiy Mototsikletniy Zavod). The motorcycle plant ceased to exist in 1943, and its assets were given to the Gorky Motorcycle Plant. After 1948 the Taganrog factory became known as the Taganrog Combine Plant.
