= DNA Motors =

South Korean automotive company

DNA Motors Co., Ltd.
- Company type: Subsidiary
- Industry: Motorcycle
- Predecessors: Daelim Motor Company, Ltd
- Founded: 14 March 1978
- Headquarters: Changwon, South Korea
- Area served: Asia; Europe
- Products: Motorcycle engines
- Owner: DL Motors
- Parent: DL Group
- Website: www.dnamotors.co.kr

DNA Motor (former Daelim Motor Company, Ltd) is a South Korean motorcycle, motorscooter and ATV manufacturer. It produces over 300,000 vehicles a year since production started in 1963. Daelim's products are popular in Germany, Spain, United Kingdom, Australia, France, Italy, Israel, Rwanda, Yemen and Sudan.

== History ==
Founded in 1962 as a division of the DL Industries, Daelim began producing Japanese Honda motorcycle designs under license for the South Korean market in Seoul, South Korea in 1963. In 1976, they established their own research and development center in Hamamatsu, Japan, and the next year, they began mass production of their own designs.

In 2018, the motorcycle division was separated and became a Daelim Motorcycle.

In 2021, the South Korean Daelim Motorcycles changed their name to the DNA Motors, although the export brand in the U.K. remains unchanged.

== Models ==
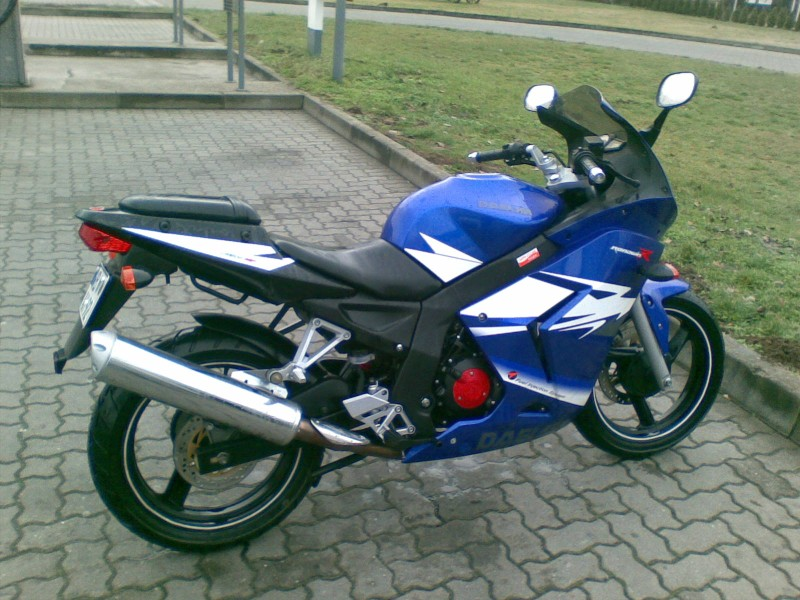
Daelim Roadwin R

- Motorcycles
  - VJF 125 Roadsport R 125
  - VJF 250 Roadsport
  - VJ 125 Roadwin E 2004-2007/Roadwin FI 2008 124cc- still trading
  - VL 125 Daystar 125
  - VC 125 Advance
  - VS
  - VT
  - CBX 125
  - GLX 125
  - VF 125 Dream
  - Alpha DS 125
  - DB 125
  - DX 125
  - GL 125 Goldwing
  - Hawk DH 100
  - Punch 100
  - VR 125
- Scooters
  - S3 125 FI/250 Advance
  - S2 125/250
  - S1 125
  - Besbi 125
  - Delfino 125
  - B-Bone 125
  - S-Five 50
  - E-Five 50
  - A-Four 50
  - Cordi 50
  - NS 125
  - VF 100 R
  - UCR 100
  - UHR 125
  - VX 125
  - XQ 300
  - Tact 50
  - Lead 50
  - Super Lead 90
  - Super Lead 125
  - Wink
  - Handy
  - Handy 2
  - Solar
  - Message
  - Trans RV
  - M-Boy
  - M-Boy Mini
- Business
  - Citi 100 (1987 - 2004)
  - Citi Plus (1997 - 2003)
  - Citi Ace 110 (2002 - 2008)
  - Citi Ace II (2008–present)
  - New Citi 100 (CA 100)
  - Citi Best (CB 115)
  - Super Cub DH 88
- Electric Scooters
  - EMote
  - EM-1/S/D
  - KS5
  - eCiti
  - Coolmax
- Three-wheel Scooters
  - TeunTeun (Strong) e
  - eCiticom Cargo
- Four-wheel Scooters
  - The Pyeon-an (Comfort) e
  - E Pyeon-an (Comfort) B
- ATV
  - ET 250/300
  - AT 100 TF
  - All Court 100
- Cars
  - Accord (1989 - 1993)
