= Hansen & Schneider (motorcycle) =

- Headquarters: Baden-Baden, Germany
- Key people: Michael Hansen; Roland Schneider
- Products: Motorcycles (1976-1982)

Hansen & Schneider were a range of limited production motorcycles produced by the German MV Agusta importers Michael Hansen and engineer Roland Schneider based on the MV Agusta 750 Sport America and the 350 Ipotesi models. The machines were manufactured from 1975 to 1982.

== History ==
Hansen GmbH in Baden-Baden, became the German importers of MV Agusta in 1970.

With nothing in the MV range between the 350 cc Ipotesi and the 750 Sport America, Hansen produced a 500 cc machine, the 500 S, by overboring the 350 Ipotesi. A racing version, the 500 SS, with double overhead camshafts was also produced.

Hansen arranged the production of two special models in 1976 from the factory, the naked 800 SS Super America and the fully faired 800 SS Super Daytona America, both based on the Sport America. These were "luxury sports machines", and the impression was created that these motorcycles were made more as a kind of hobby than commercial reasons.

Hansen commissioned Magni to build a 892 cc machine, the 900 S Cento Valli in 1977. Roland Schneider worked closely with Arturo Magni on the development of this model, the increased stroke crankshaft being produced in Germany.

In 1979 Hansen was given permission by the MV directors and the Agusta family to continue using the MV name on the 4-cylinder machines. The Corona, Grand Prix and Agostini models were built by Schneider, using some parts, such as cylinders, chain drive conversions and frames made by Magni. Production of these models continued to 1982.

Hansen were the German distributor for Magni parts, and when Magni produced the Magni-Honda in 1980, many of the 300 produced were sold by Hansen. Such was the cooperation between the two companies it has been speculated that the MB model designation stood for Magni-Hansen rather than Magni-Honda Following the success of the Honda engine machine, Hansen requested that Magni made a version with BMW. The Magni-BMW did not sell well.

Hansen, now run by Roland Schneider, continued with the supply of parts and restoration of MV Agustas until the 1990s when MSM-Performance took over the operation.

== Models ==
=== 500 S ===
Based on the 350 cc MV Ipotesi, the engine's bore was increased to 75 mm, giving a displacement of 472 cc and a power output of 53 hp (40 kW) @ 8,900 rpm. Larger 3.00x18 front and 3.50x18 rear tyres were fitted. An optional reduced-power version with 43 hp (32 kW) @ 8,200 rpm was available. These machines were produced in 1976 and 1977.

=== 500 SS ===
In 1977 a racing version of the 500 S was offered to special order. The machine had a completely revised engine with double overhead camshafts and produced 66 hp @ 11,100 rpm. Five examples were built.

=== 800 SS Super America ===
In 1976 Hansen arranged with the MV factory for them to produce an enhanced version of the 750 Sport America. The standard model of the America was marketed as the 800 S America in Germany and the enhanced model was designated the 800 SS Super America. A rear disc brake was fitted and engine output raised to 82 bhp (61 kW) @ 9000 rpm from the 789 cc engine. The model was optionally available with a Magni exhaust system and EPM magnesium wheels. The model was produced from 1976 to 1978.

=== 800 SS Super Daytona America ===
The 800 SS Super Daytona America was a further development of the 800 SS Super America. It was fitted with a full fairing, a Magni 4-into-1 exhaust and EPM wheels. Power output was raised to 90 bhp (67 kW)) @ 10,000 rpm. The model was produced from 1976 to 1977.

=== 900 S Cento Valli ===
Hansen Roland Schneider commissioned Magni to build a 900 cc model, the 900 S Cento Valli. The engine used a 70 mm bore and a German crankshaft with a 2 mm increase in stroke, giving 892 cc. Valve sizes were increased to 31.8 mm inlet and 29 mm exhaust, four Dell'Orto PHF 30A carburettors were fitted and power increased to 104 bhp (78 kW) @ 10,000 rpm. The standard MV frame and shaft drive were retained, but with Koni rear shock absorbers. About 10 of these models were made, which was also known as the 900 S Arturo Magni Cento Valli.

=== 1000 S Corona ===
Introduced in 1978, the 1000 S Corona was a larger capacity version of the Cento Valli. On the MV 4-cylinder engines the cylinders were cast individually. The 70 mm bore used on the Cento Valli left the cylinder liner very thin. By casting the cylinders in pairs, Magni was able to fit larger liners to match the increased bore. These cylinders are recognisable by having 9 cooling fins; the individually cast items having 11 fins. Using the Magni paired cylinders and increasing the engine stroke to 62 mm give the Corona a 954 cc capacity. A racing camshaft was fitted giving a power output of 106 bhp (79 kW) @ 10,200 rpm.

=== 1100 Grand Prix ===
In March 1978 Hansen announced the largest four of the range with a displacement of 1066 cc. Specially cast 9 fin, paired barrels had a 74 mm bore. To accommodate the larger bore, a new crankshaft carrier had to be produced. A specially produced crankshaft with a 62 mm stroke was used. The engine produced 119 bhp (89 kW) @ 10,200 rpm. 5 engines were made. Initially two were fitted in MV frames, modified for the chain drive of this model, and two fitted in Magni frames. The final engine was not fitted into a frame until the 2000s.

=== 1000 Agostini ===
The 1000 Agostini was a development of the 1000 S Corona and was introduced in 1979. It used the same engine. The model was fitted with chain rear drive, a Magni frame with a box section swinging arm and Magni "banana" exhausts. Only 4 examples of this model were made.

== Technical details ==
	500 S	500 SS	800 SS Super America	800 SS Super Daytona America	900 S Cento Valli	1000 S Corona	1100 Grand Prix	1000 Agostini
Production	1976-1977	1977	1976–1978	1976–1978	1977–1978	1978–1982	1978–1982	1979–1980
Capacity	472 cc	472 cc	789 cc	789 cc	892 cc	954 cc	1066 cc	954 cc
No. of cylinders	2	2	4	4	4	4	4	4
Valve actuation	OHV	DOHC	DOHC	DOHC	DOHC	DOHC	DOHC	DOHC
Bore/Stroke	75 x 56 mm	75 x 56 mm	67 × 56 mm	67 × 56 mm	70 × 58 mm	70 × 62 mm	74 × 62 mm	70 × 62 mm
Power	53 hp (40 kW) @ 8,900 rpm	66 hp (49 kW) @ 11,100 rpm	82 bhp (61 kW) @ 9.000 rpm	90 bhp (67 kW) @ 10.000 rpm	104 bhp (78 kW) @ 10,000 rpm	106 bhp (79 kW) @ 10,200 rpm	119 bhp (89 kW) @ 10,200 rpm	104 bhp (78 kW) @ 10,000 rpm
Final drive	Chain	Chain	Shaft	Shaft	Shaft	Shaft	Chain	Chain
Wheelbase	1310 mm	1310 mm	1420 mm	1420 mm	1420 mm	1390 mm	1450 mm	1450 mm
Maximum speed			210 km/h (130 mph)		235 km/h (146 mph)	230 km/h (140 mph)	237 km/h (147 mph)	230 km/h (140 mph)
Production quantity		5			10	12	5	4
Footnotes								

== Bibliography ==
- Cathcart, Alan (May 2003). "Magni-ficent machines". Italian Bike. pp. 47–51. Archived from the original on 2012-04-27.
- Cloesen, Uli (2014). Italian Café Racers. Veloce Publishing Ltd. ISBN 9781845847494.
- Falloon, Ian (2011). The Book of the Classic MV Agusta Fours. Veloce Publishing Ltd. ISBN 9781845842031.
- Maierbacher, Peter (1980). "Faszinatio". Motorräd (in German). No. 11. pp. 6–11. Archived from the original on 2019-11-09.
- Schafer, Michael (1992). "Eilige Armei". Test & Technik (in German). No. 21. pp. 46–51. Archived from the original on 2019-11-09.
- Schermer, Franz Josef (September 1977). "Quadrophonie". Motorräd (in German). No. 14. Archived from the original on 2019-06-10.
- Schwab, Ulrich (22 March 1978). "GroBer Preis". Motorräd (in German). No. 6. pp. 14–15. Archived from the original on 9 November 2019.
- Schwab, Ulrich (1987). Motorräder : 1970-1987; Typen, Daten u. Preise in Deutschland (in German) (1. Aufl ed.). Motorbuch-Verlag. ISBN 9783613011724.
- Tragatsch, Erwin (2000). Berühmte Motorräder (in German) (Spezialausg ed.). Motorbuch-Verl. ISBN 9783613020382.
- Motorrad Katalog 1977 (in German). Motorpresse, München. 1977.
