= WSK (motorcycle) =

Defunct Polish motorcycle brand

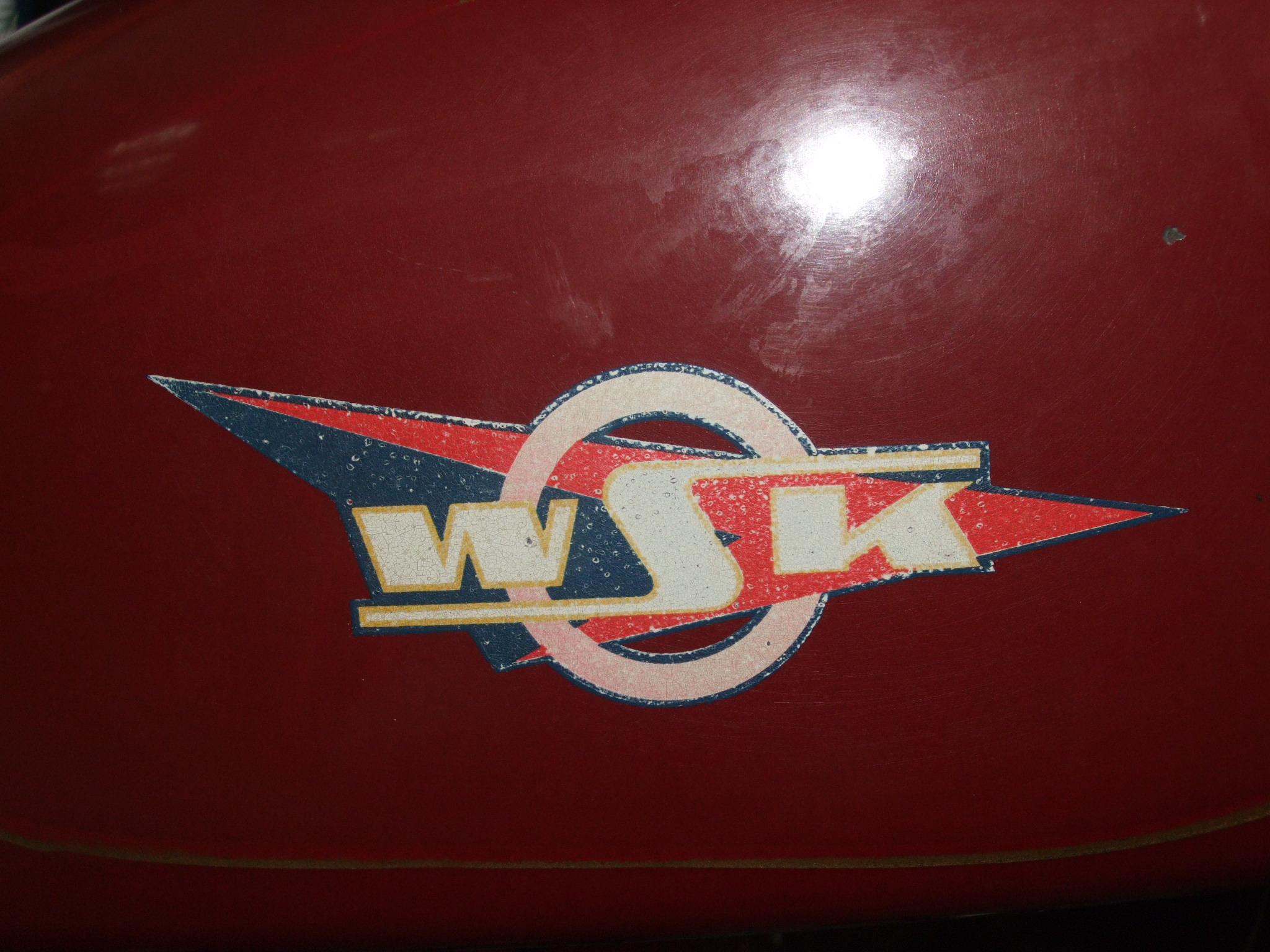
- WSK logo

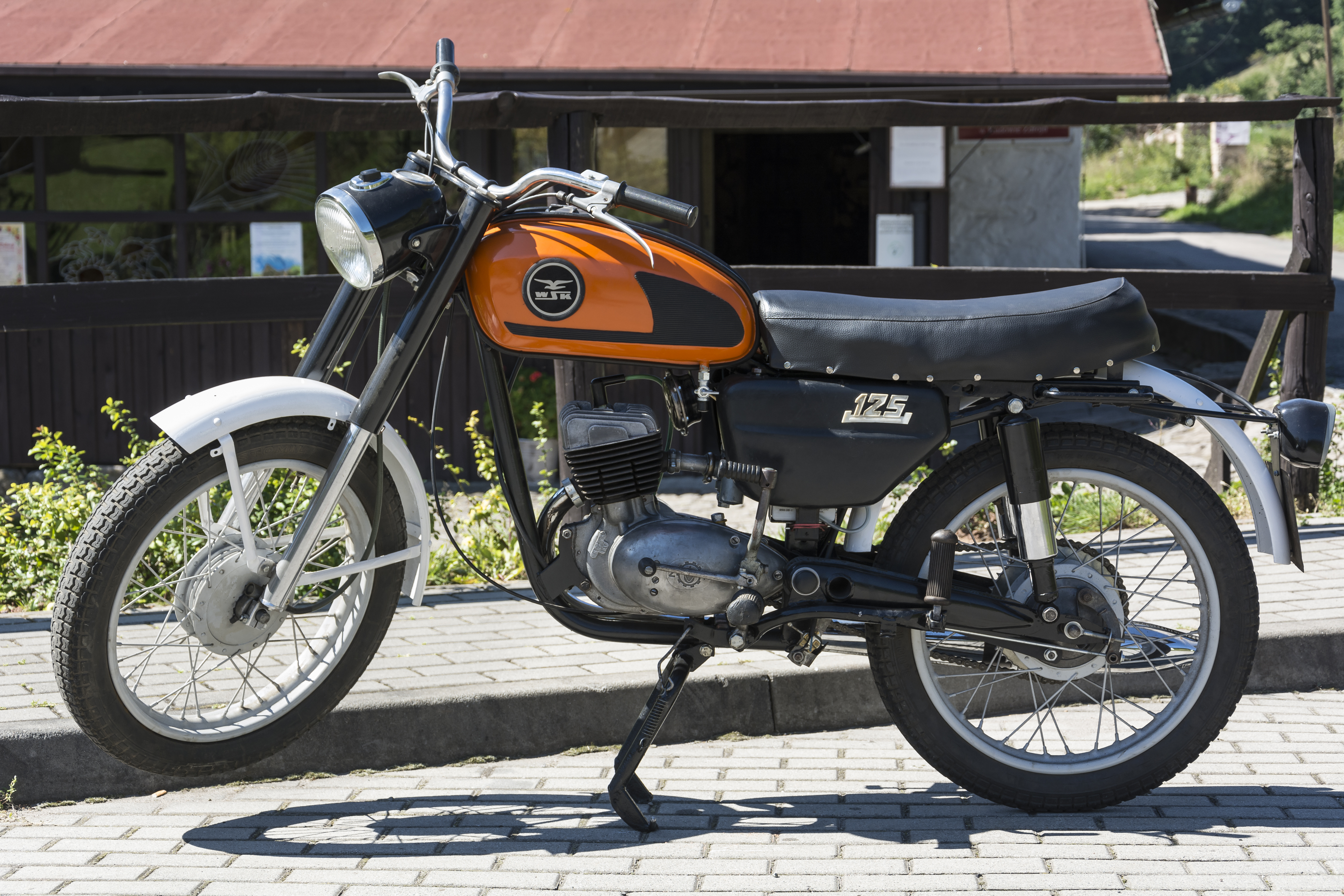
- WSK M06B3 Kos
- Industry: Motorcycle manufacturers
- Founded: 1955 in Świdnik, Poland
- Defunct: October 1985

WSK was a brand of motorcycles produced between 1955 and 1985 by the aerospace company PZL-Świdnik (formerly Wytwórnia Sprzętu Komunikacyjnego) in their factory in Świdnik, Poland. The name and trademark were derived directly from the name of the manufacturer: Wytwornia Sprzetu Komunikacyjnego (English: Communications Equipment Factory).

== History ==
In 1955 Wytwórnia Sprzętu Komunikacyjnego was asked to produce the 125 cc WFM M06 motorcycles as WFM were unable to meet market demands. Except for the tank badge the WSK and WFM models were identical. The WSK engineers started work on an improved model. The new machine had a new engine, the S-017, a new frame made of welded from closed rectangular sections and telescopic forks. This went into production in 1959 as the M06Z and a lower specification model, the M06L was also introduced. Derivatives of this model continued to be produced until motorcycle production ceased in 1985.

A 150 cc motorcycle was produced in 1960 by fitting a WFM S06 engine in the M06Z. The model, 150Z, was only produced that year.

In 1972 a 175 cc model was introduced, the M21 W2. Derivatives of this model were produced until the factory closed.

The factory was closed in October 1985, by which time around 2,000,000 motorcycles has been produced, 1,700,000 of which were in the 125 cc class.

== Competition machines ==
The factory produced a limited number of 125 and 175 cc road racers.

The company also produced the WSK FIS speedway bike from 1955–1959. The engine used in these machines was a copy of the British JAP speedway engine.

== Museum ==
On 13 May 2010, the first museum dedicated to this brand of motorcycles was opened in Świdnik. Currently, Moto Strefa WSK is one of the components of the Świdnica History Zone, opened on 7 September 2013.
