= Sondors =

American electric motorcycle manufacturer

Sondors, stylized SONDORS, was an electric bicycle maker based in California. It expanded its business to electric motorcycle manufacturing through a 2015 IndieGogo crowdfunding campaign netting over 5 million USD, one of the highest grossing crowdfunding campaigns at the time. The company faced controversy over its business practices and unreasonably low expected price for its planned electric motorcycle, listed in its crowdfunding campaign at $600. The motorcycle eventually sold for $5000, and over 1400 units were received by customers. The motorcycles experienced widespread failures in many of their components. The company faced accusations of mismanagement and fraudulent business practices, and entered receivership in 2023, leaving its manufacturers with thousands of unsold units.
