= Matter Electric =

Indian electric two-wheeler manufacturer

- Type: Private
- Industry: Automotive; Electric vehicles; Motorcycle
- Founded: 2019; 7 years ago
- Founders: Mohal Lalbhai
- Headquarters: Ahmedabad, Gujarat
- Area served: India
- Products: Aera 5000; Aera 5000+

Matter Electric is an Indian electric two-wheeler manufacturer headquartered in Ahmedabad, Gujarat. It was founded by Mohal Lalbhai in 2019.

== History ==
Matter Electric was founded in 2019 by Mohal Lalbhai. In June 2024 Matter raised INR 82.6 crore from Helena Special Investments Fund, Japan Airlines & Translink Fund, Capital 2B Fund, and Abhay P. Shah from Miracle Carriers. In the same year Julym Matter raised INR 290 crore from Helena Special Investments Fund.

In 2023 March Matter launched its first electric motorcycle, the Aera. The motorcycle featured a 4-speed manual gearbox and a liquid-cooled battery system and a four-speed manual transmission. The company develops components such as the motor, power electronics, and battery management systems in-house, also the motor, power electronics, and battery management systems (BMS) were developed in-house

== Product ==
Matter Aera is a motorcycle launched in march 2023. The launch of the motorcycle marked the company's entry into the part of the market.

Aera is powered by a liquid-cooled electric motor producing around 10.5–11.5 kW of power and connected to a 4-speed manual transmission. The motorcycle uses a 5 kWh battery that provides a range of about 125 km to 172 km on a full charge. It can accelerate from 0 to 60 km/h in under 6 seconds and has a top speed of approximately 105 km/h. Apart from these Matter Aera features a 7-inch touchscreen TFT instrument cluster with Bluetooth connectivity, 4G LTE, and Wi-Fi support.

== Event ==
The company organised a nationwide ride initiative, covering multiple states to promote electric mobility and environmental awareness in 2024. In April 2025 Gujarat Chief Minister Bhupendra Patel inaugurated electric motorcycle manufacturing facility in Changodar, Ahmedabad.
