= Gesits Motor Nusantara =

Motorcycle manufacturers of Indonesia

PT Gesits Motor Nusantara
- Formerly: PT Wijaya Karya Industri Manufaktur (2018-2023)
- Industry: Automotive
- Founded: 28 June 2018; 7 years ago
- Headquarters: Bogor, West Java
- Area served: Indonesia
- Products: Electric motorcycles and scooters
- Owner: PT Industri Baterai Indonesia (53,93%); PT Wijaya Karya Industri & Konstruksi (47,04%)
- Website: gesitsmotors.com

PT Gesits Motor Nusantara is a subsidiary of Indonesia Battery Corporation engaged in the production of electric motorcycle. The company has a factory in Cileungsi, West Java with a production capacity of around 200 units per day. Due to the COVID-19 pandemic, the company's production capacity was reduced to 60 units per day.

Gesits then underwent a durability test by driving from Jakarta to Bali. The aspects tested included performance, range, power consumption, and safety. President Joko Widodo then confirmed that Gesits was ready to enter the domestic automotive market and was ready for mass production in 2019.
