= Greta Electric Scooters =

Electric two-wheeler manufacturer

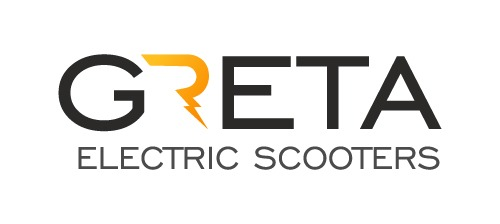
- Company type: Private limited
- Industry: Electric vehicles
- Founded: 2019
- Headquarters: Gujarat, India
- Products: Electric 2-wheelers
- Services: Motor vehicle manufacturing
- Parent: Raj Electromotives Pvt. Ltd
- Website: https://gretaelectric.com/

Greta Electric Scooters is an Indian electric two-wheeler manufacturer, based in Gujarat. Its manufacturing plants are located in Gujarat and Haryana.

The company is the subsidiary of Raj Electromotives Pvt. Ltd.

== History ==
Greta Electric Scooters was founded in 2019 by Raj Mehta. The Gujarat-based EV startup is engaged in the manufacturing of electric scooters.

In 2021, Greta opened its first international showroom in Nepal, and e-scooters are under road test in Europe.
