= Lark Streamliner =

- Manufacturer: Shea Nyquist
- Class: Land-speed record streamliner
- Engine: Electric
- Power: 200 kW_{e}
- Transmission: Single speed, 3:1 reduction
- Frame type: Tubular steel
- Weight: 1,700 lb (770 kg) (dry)

The Lark Streamliner is an electric streamliner motorcycle built to challenge the standing land speed record for two-wheeled vehicles. The builder, Shea Nyquist, is an American aerospace engineer educated at San Jose State University. Nyquist salvaged many of the parts, including the 22 kWh LiFePO_{4} battery pack and the 200 kW electric motor. It was reported in 2019 that the vehicle reached 80 miles per hour (130 km/h) at 10% throttle. The machine weighs 1,700 pounds (770 kg) without fairings. The fairings are made from secondhand carbon fiber by Nyquist in his barn.

As of 2021, Nyquist plans to run the bike at Bonneville salt flats. The motorcycle will run in the Omega class as a streamliner motorcycle. Standing SCTA record is 175 mph.
