= Z Electric Vehicle =

Z Electric Vehicle Corporation
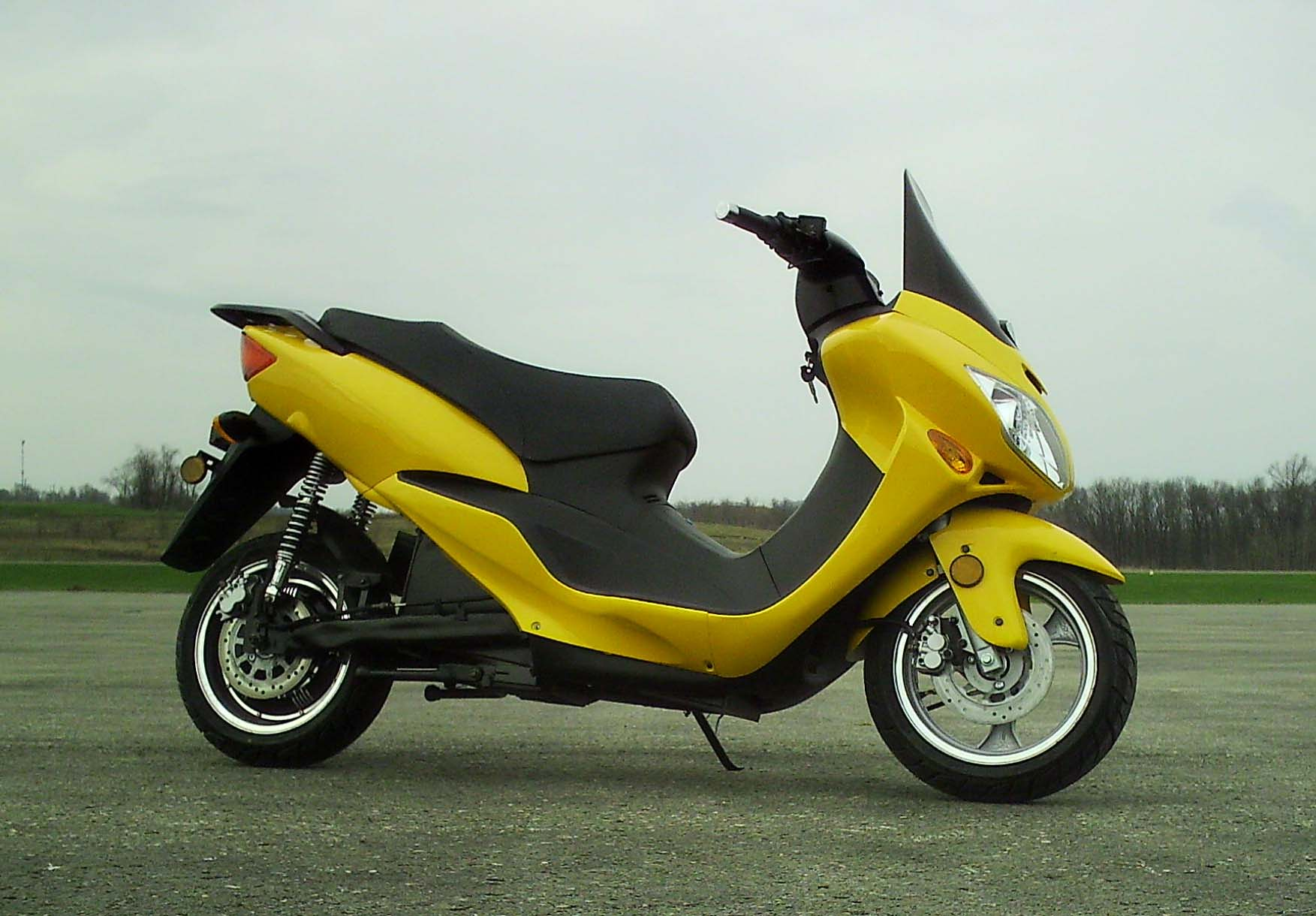
- Founder: Darus H. Zehrbach, Jr.
- Headquarters: Morgantown, West Virginia, US
- Area served: US, Europe, Asia, Australia
- Products: Electric Vehicles
- Website: zelectricvehicle.com

Z Electric Vehicle Corporation (ZEV) is an American owned and operated electric scooter manufacturer and distributor based in Morgantown, West Virginia, with test facilities in Waynesboro, Pennsylvania. Its vehicles are assembled in both the US and China with assembly shops in the US, Australia, and Vietnam. ZEV says its electric scooters are the world's most powerful, fastest, and have the longest range.

== History ==
Zev began as a garage project for Darus Zehrbach Jr., in his home garage in 2006. He saw the potential for a global market, while traveling the world as a mechanical engineer. In 2009 operations moved to an airport hangar in Waynesburg, PA before moving back to Morgantown, WV in 2013 where the company is currently located. Zehrbach's son, Darus Zehrbach III, joined the family business at age 24 after earning an MBA from West Virginia University.

== Scooters and motorcycles ==
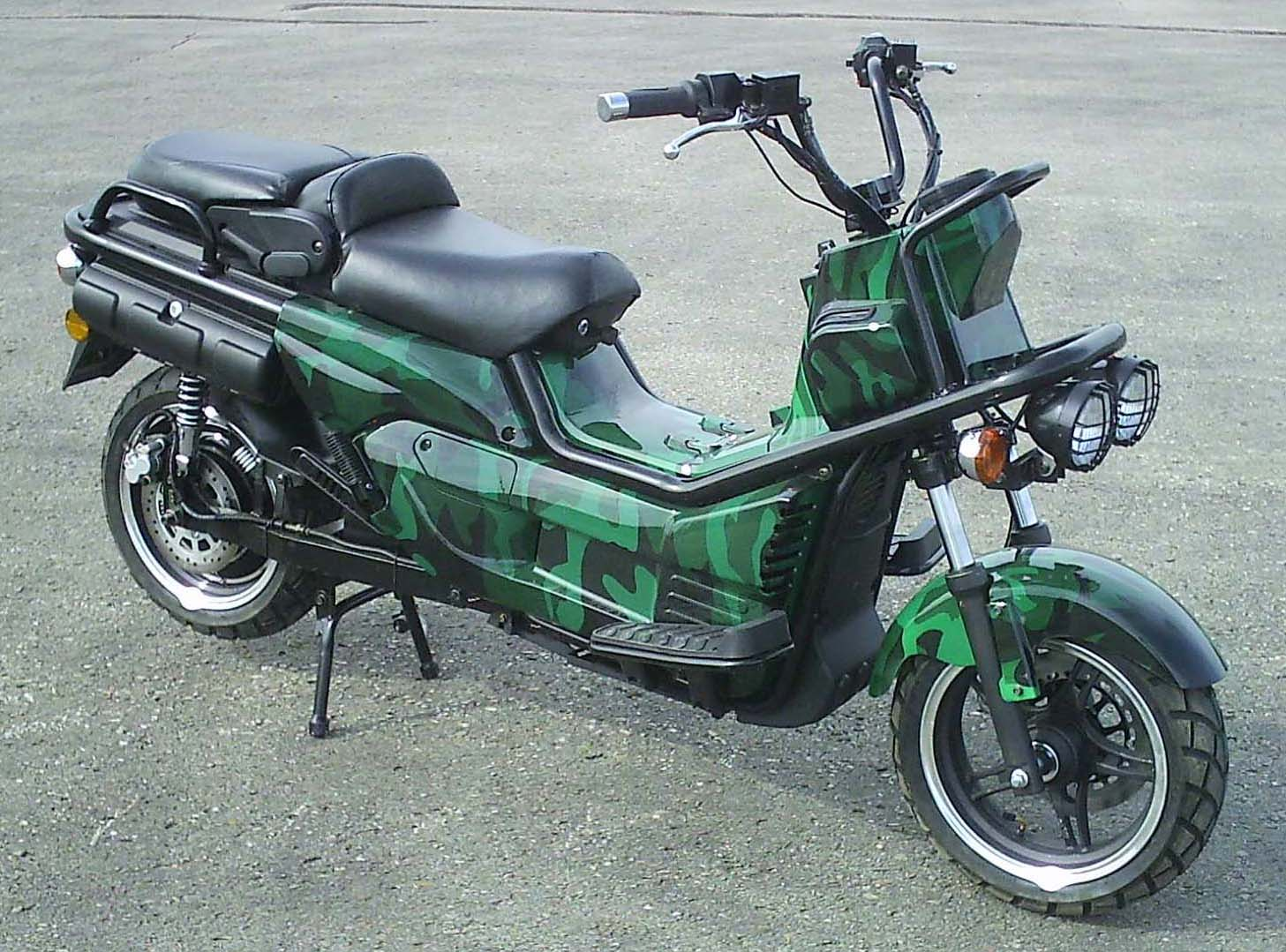
ZEV T series

ZEV has 19 electric scooter models The scooters range from the ZEV 3600 with a top speed of 60 kilometres per hour (37 mph) and a range of 32 miles (51 km), to the 10 kW (13 hp) 10 LRC, with a range (at 65% power) of 140 miles (230 km), and a top speed of 130 kilometres per hour (81 mph).

ZEV also makes a line of electric motorcycles, full fairing sports bikes referred to as their M-S line.

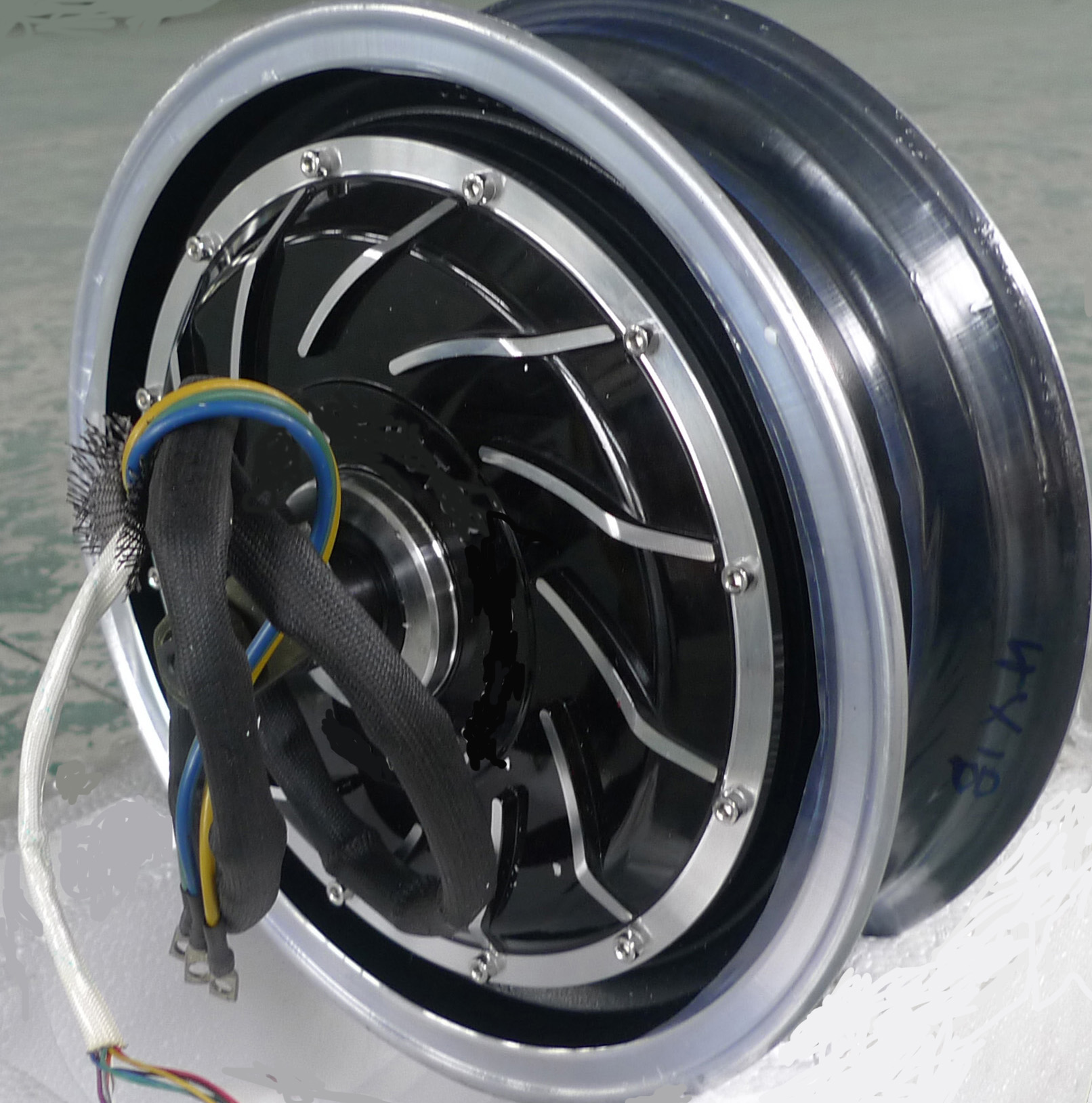
ZEV hub motor

ZEV uses a gearless electromagnet powered hub style motor and powers its scooters with lithium batteries, as well as less costly lead/sodium silicate batteries. ZEV's large-diameter, multiphase motors, are cooled using an oil bath arrangement, which lets ZEV run a large motor at high speeds without the power sapping and motor-destroying effects of excess heat.

ZEV claims that its motors are among the world's most efficient in that they have more range than other competing bikes with up to 30% more battery capacity. ZEV competed in the 2016 Vetter Challenge, an Ohio efficiency rally—though ZEV's scooters were disqualified for failing to finish.

"What we try to do is offer higher speeds and performance than the competition, generally at 25 percent less price. We're the only company that uses hub motors, built in the back wheel. There's no chain, there's no belt drive and no air being forced through the motor, so you'll find our bikes are significantly quieter than anybody else's electric bike," said Zehrbach.

== Markets ==
In addition to sales in the US, as of 2013 ZEV was exporting scooters to 24 countries worldwide, and has won awards for exports and marketing. With 19 models of scooter, and a motorcycle, ZEV is reported to have the widest range of models of any electric motorcycle and scooter manufacturing company in the world.

== Past convictions of founder ==
In 1994 a court upheld the conviction of Darus Zehrbach and an associate on charges of bankruptcy fraud dating back to 1989. Zehrbach was accused of rigging an auction of the assets of a bankrupt aircraft manufacturing company, by paying off others to refrain from bidding. Zehrbach was sentenced to imprisonment for 21 months, followed by three years of supervised release.

In 2004 a court confirmed another conviction of Zehrbach and an associate of conspiracy to defraud buyers of aircraft kit engines between 1994 and 1996. Zehrbach was found to have promised to deliver aircraft engine kits that did not yet exist. The court concluded the engines did not exist, he had no intention of delivering them, and simply took the buyers’ money and never repaid it. The court affirmed his sentence of 54 months imprisonment, and required restitution of $224,148.10.

In April 2019 Zehrbach was again sentenced to prison time; this time for lying to a federal agent about his violation of economic sanctions against Iran by exporting scooters there.

== See also ==
- Electric motorcycles and scooters
- A tour of ZEV vehicles - goo.gl/31biEF
- ZEV Electric vehicle review goo.gl/mZqNuX
