= Electric motorcycles and scooters =

Plug-in electric vehicles with two or three wheels

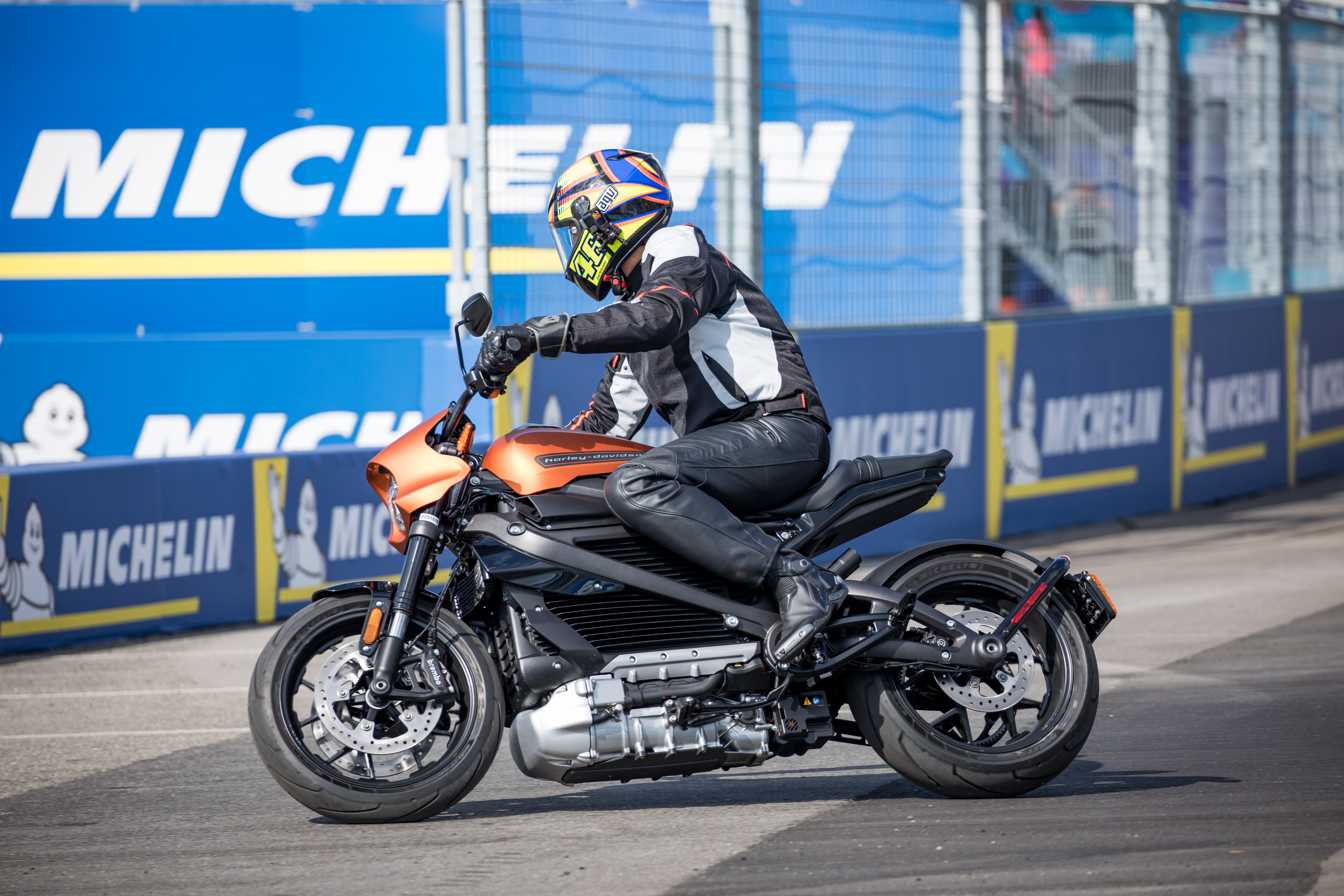
Harley-Davidson LiveWire

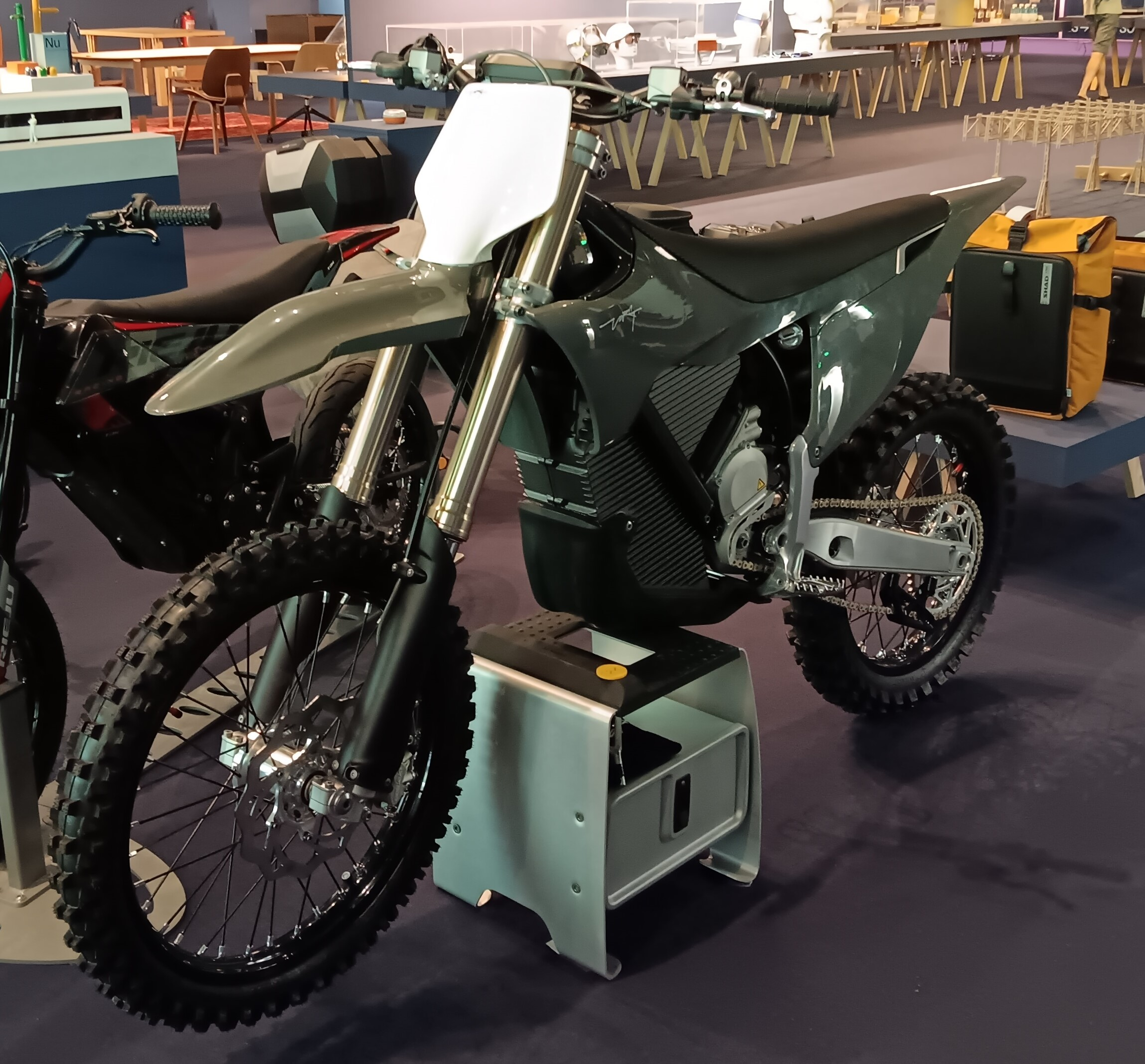
Stark Varg

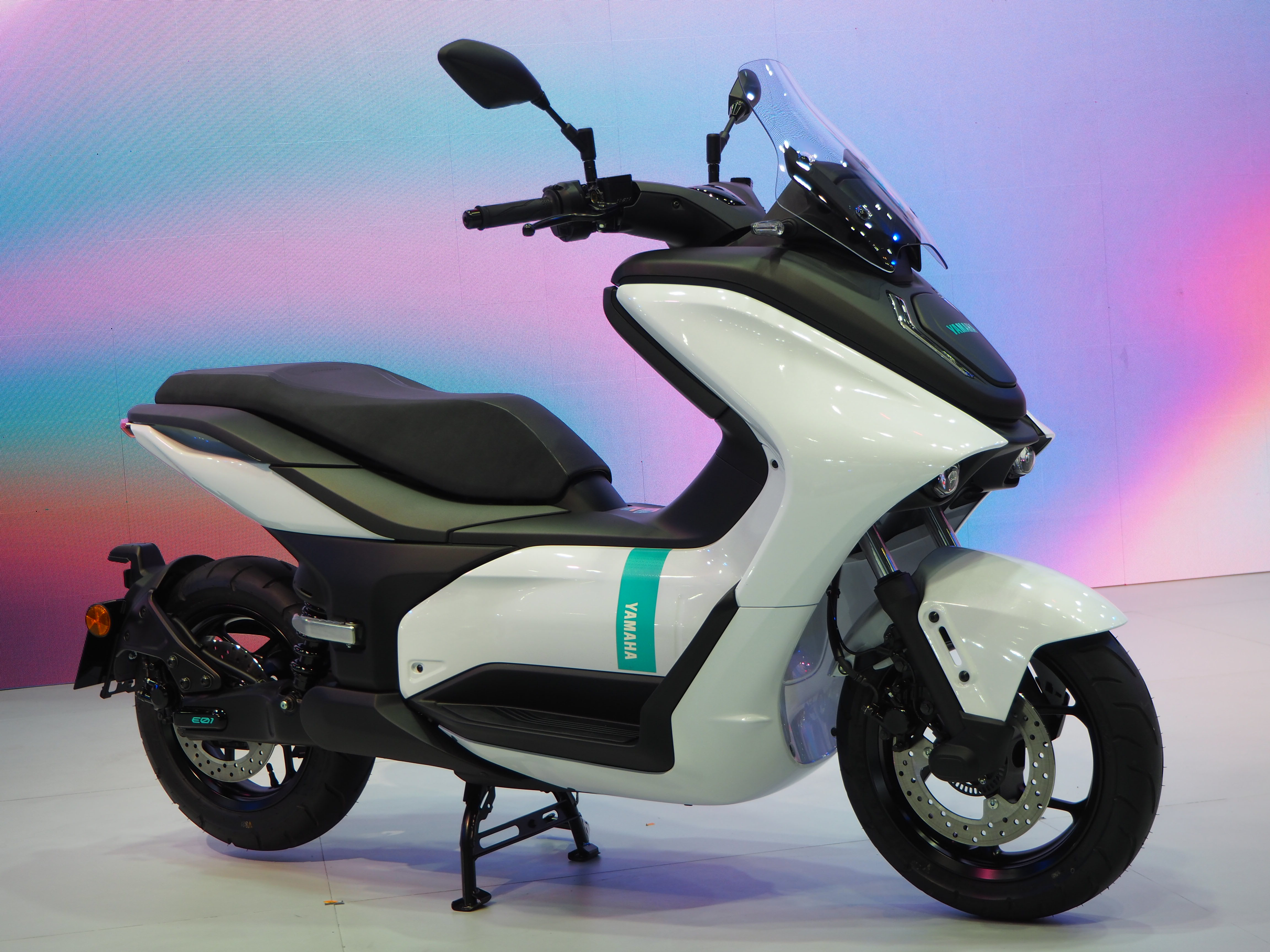
Yamaha E01

Electric motorcycles and scooters are plug-in electric vehicles with two or three wheels. Power is supplied by a rechargeable battery that drives one or more electric motors. Electric scooters are distinguished from motorcycles by having a step-through frame, instead of being straddled. Electric bicycles are similar vehicles, often distinguished by retaining the ability to be propelled by the rider pedaling in addition to battery propulsion.

Electric scooters with the rider standing are known as e-scooters.

== History ==
Timeline
1895	Earliest known electric motorcycle patent.
1911	Popular Mechanics article introduces an electric motorcycle.
1919	Ransomes, Sims & Jefferies make an electric motorcycle prototype.
1936	Socovel electric motorcycle company founded.
1940	Norwegian motorcycle company "Tempo" produced the Tempo Electro Transportsykkel
1946	Marketeer company founded, based on an electric motorcycle made by Merle Williams.
1967	Karl Kordesch makes a hydrazine fuel cell motorcycle
1974	Mike Corbin's motorcycle Quick Silver sets electric motorcycle speed record of 266.165 km/h (165.387 mph)
1996	First mass-produced electric scooter, Peugeot Scoot'Elec, released
2011	Chip Yates sets Guinness record of fastest electric motorcycle with 316.899 km/h (196.912 mph)
2013	First FIM eRoad Racing World Cup

=== Selected electric motorcycles and scooters ===
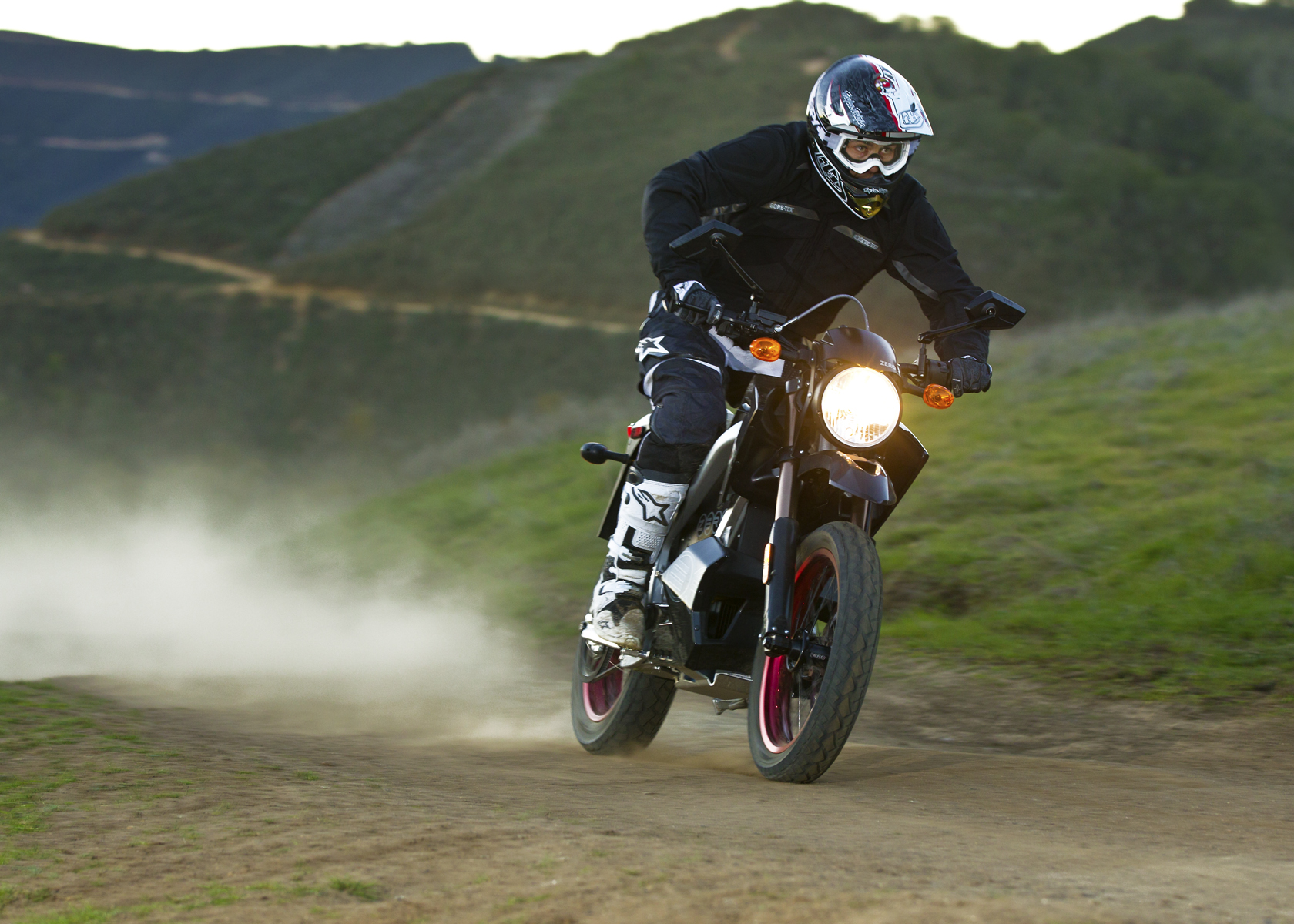
Zero DS (motorcycle)

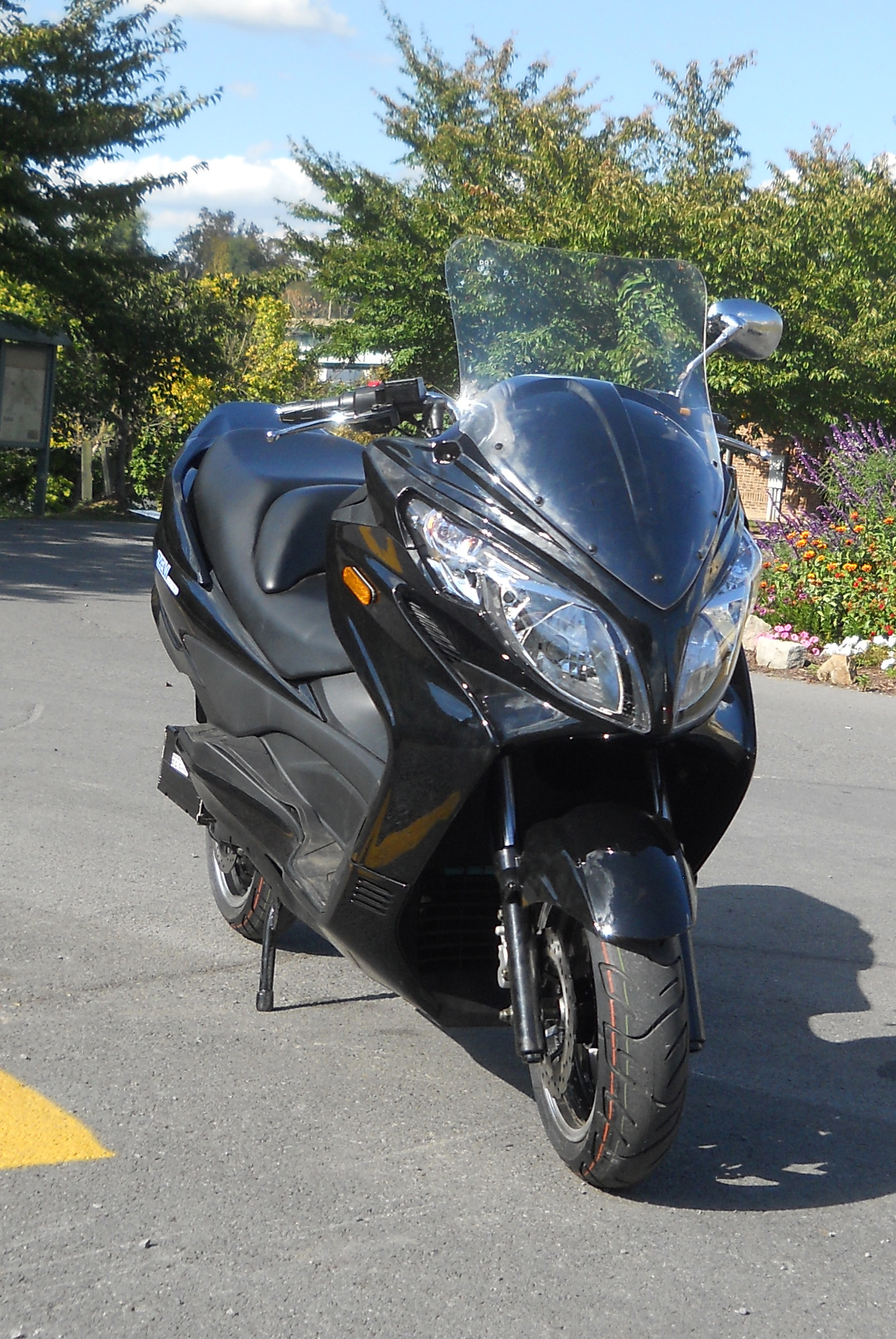
ZEV LRC (scooter)

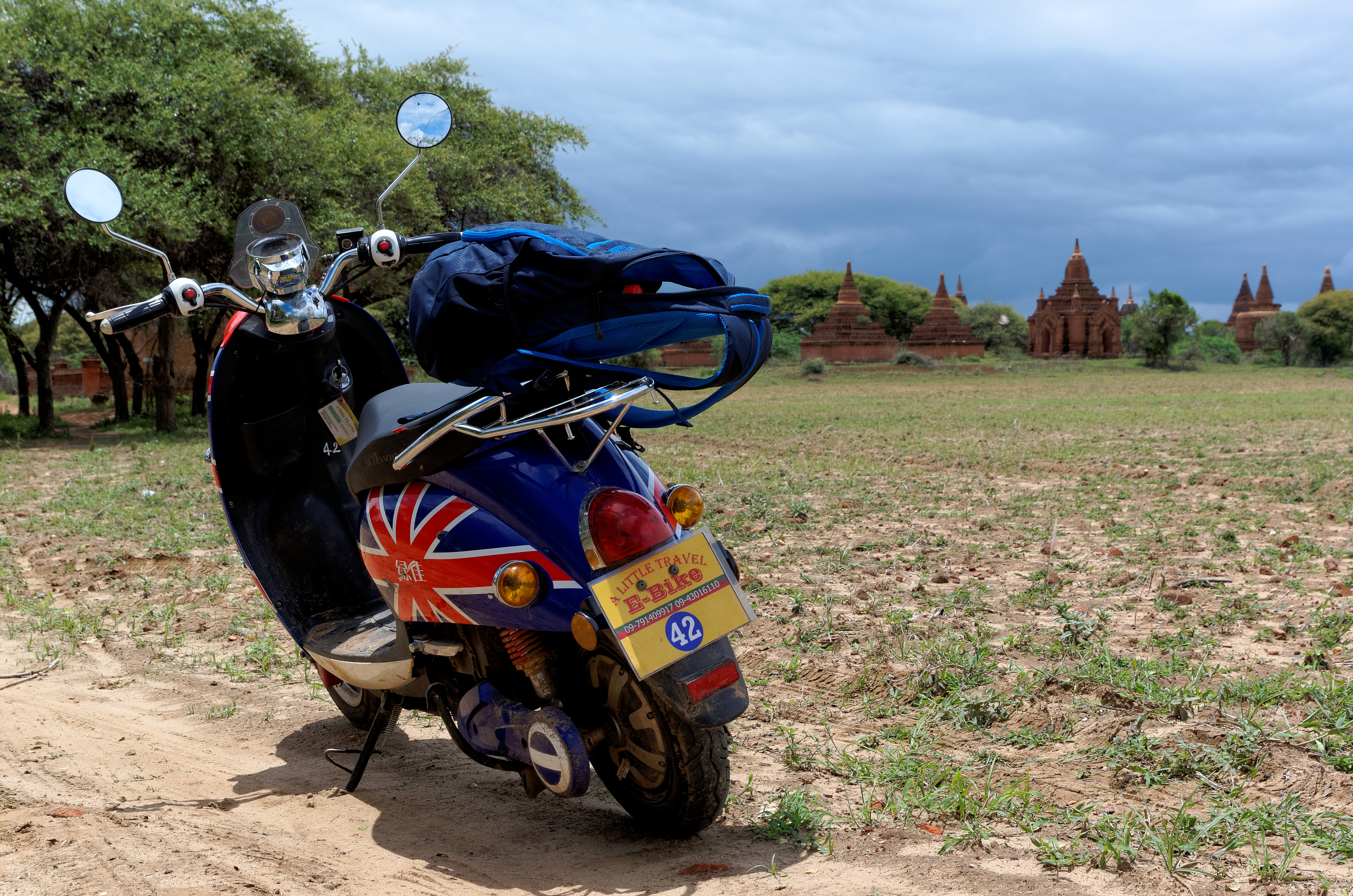
Electric scooter on the field on Bagan Plain in Myanmar

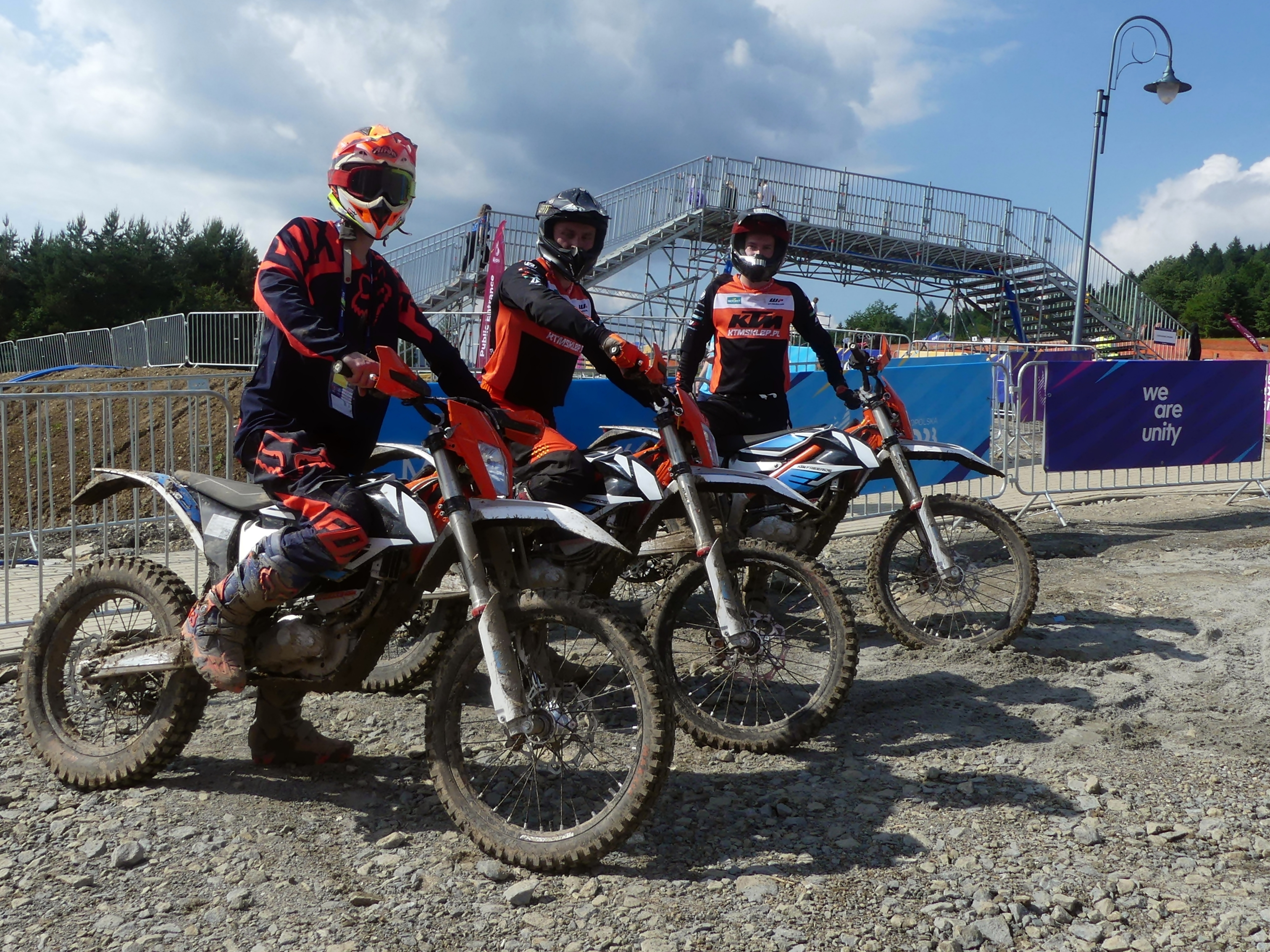
KTM, electric off-road motorcycles

=== 1895 to 1950 ===
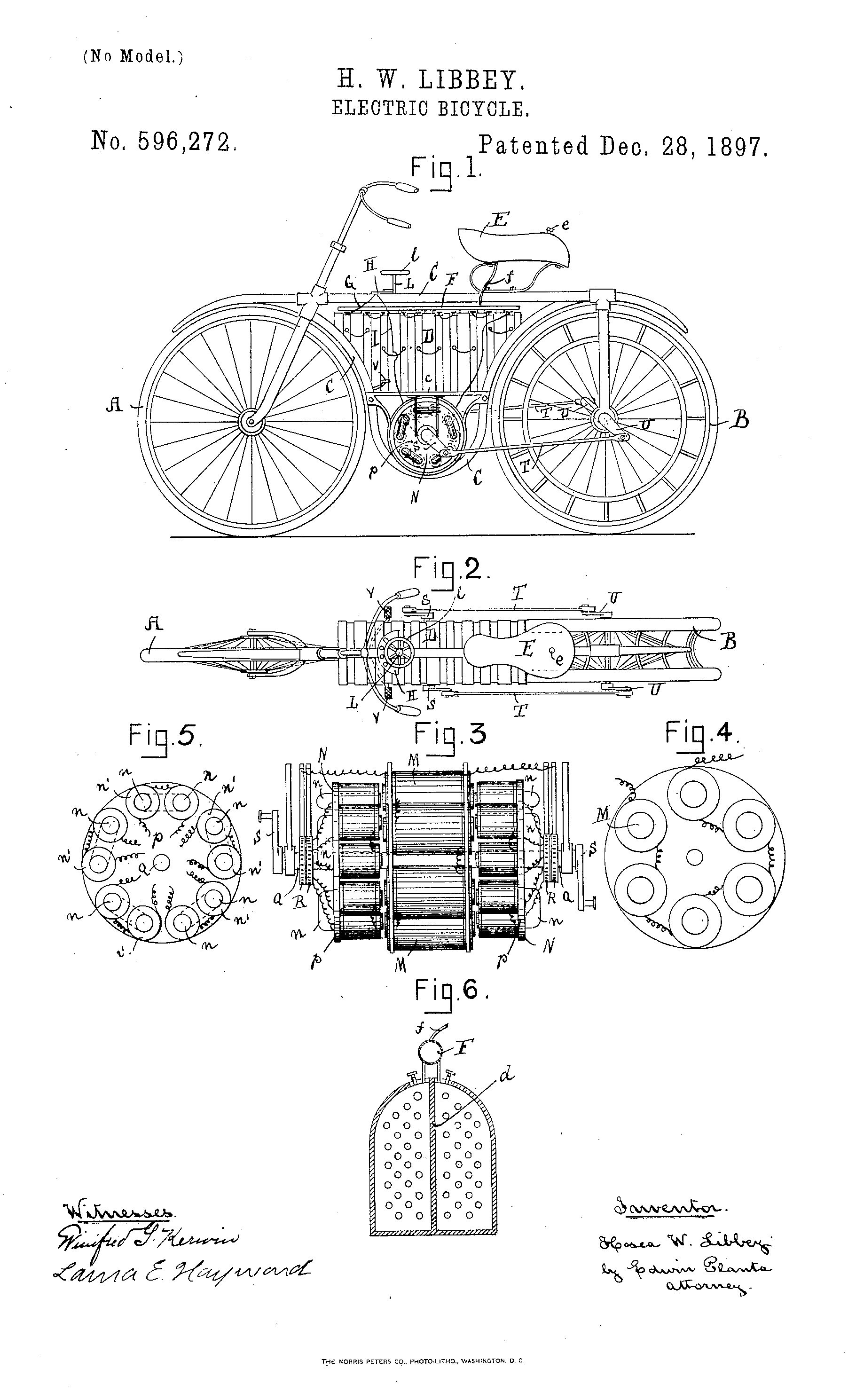
Patent drawing for an "Electric Bicycle" (1895)

The early history of electric motorcycles is somewhat unclear. On 19 September 1895, a patent application for an "electrical bicycle" was filed by Ogden Bolton Jr. of Canton Ohio. On 8 November of the same year, another patent application for an "electric bicycle" was filed by Hosea W. Libbey of Boston.

At the Stanley Cycle Show in 1896 in London, England, bicycle manufacturer Humber exhibited an electric tandem bicycle. Powered by a bank of storage batteries, the motor was placed in front of the rear wheel. Speed control was by a resistance placed across the handlebars. This electric bicycle was mainly intended for racetrack use.

The October 1911 issue of Popular Mechanics mentioned the introduction of an electric motorcycle. It claimed to have a range of 120 km (75 miles) to 160 km (100 miles) per charge. The motorcycle had a three-speed controller, with speeds of 6, 24 and 56 km/h (4, 15 and 35 mph).

In 1919, Ransomes, Sims & Jefferies made a prototype electric motorcycle in which the batteries were fitted under the seat of the sidecar. Even though the vehicle was registered for road use, it never went past the trial stage.

In 1936, the Limelette brothers founded an electric motorcycle company called Socovel (Société pour l’étude et la Construction de Véhicules Electriques or Company for research and manufacture of electric vehicles) in Brussels. They continued production during the German occupation with their permission. Due to fuel rationing, they found some degree of success. But after the war, they switched to conventional models. The electric models remained available until 1948.

During the World War II, compelled by fuel rationing in the United States, Merle Williams of Long Beach, California, invented a two-wheeled electric motorcycle that towed a single-wheeled trailer. Due to the popularity of the vehicle, Williams started making more such vehicles in his garage. In 1946, it led to the formation of the Marketeer Company (current-day ParCar Corp.).

=== 1950 to 1980 ===
In 1967, Karl Kordesch, working for Union Carbide, made a fuel cell/Nickel–cadmium battery hybrid electric motorcycle. It was later replaced with a hydrazine fuel cell, giving it a range of 200 mpg_{‑US} (240 mpg_{‑imp}; 0.012 L/km) and a top speed of 40 km/h (25 mph).

In the same year, a prototype electric motorcycle called the Papoose, was built by the Indian Motorcycle Company under the direction of Floyd Clymer.

In 1974, Auranthic Corp., a small manufacturer in California, produced a small motorcycle called the Charger. It had a 48 km/h (30 mph) top speed and an 80 km (50 miles) range on a full charge.

In the early 1970s, Mike Corbin built a street-legal commuter electric motorcycle called the Corbin Electric. Later in 1974, Corbin, riding a motorcycle called the Quick Silver, set the electric motorcycle speed world record at 266.165 km/h (165.387 mph). The motorcycle used a 24 volt electric starter motor from a Douglas A-4B fighter plane. In 1975, Corbin built a battery-powered prototype street motorcycle called the City Bike. This motorcycle used a battery manufactured by Yardney Electric.

In June 1975, the first Annual Alternative Vehicle Regatta was held at Mt. Washington, New Hampshire. The event was created and promoted by Charles McArthur, an environmentalist. On June 17, Corbin's motorcycle completed the 13 km (8 miles) uphill course in 26 minutes.

=== 1980s to 2000s ===
In 1988, Ed Rannberg, founder of Eyeball Engineering, tested his electric drag motorcycle in Bonneville. In 1992, the January issue of Cycle World carried an article about his bike called the KawaSHOCKI. It could complete 400 m (1/4 mile) in 11–12 seconds.

In 1995, Electric Motorbike Inc. was founded by Scott Cronk and Rick Whisman in Santa Rosa, California. In 1996, they released the EMB Lectra which used a variable reluctance motor. It had a top speed of about 72 km/h (45 mph) and a range of 55 km (35 miles). Around 100 were built.

In 1996, the first mass-produced electric scooter, Peugeot Scoot'Elec, was released, using Nickel-Cadmium batteries to propel it to a range of 40 km (25 miles).

=== 2000s ===
On 26 August 2000, Scotty Pollacheck established a drag racing record of completing a 402 m (1/4 mile) in 9.450 seconds on the Woodburn track in Oregon. Pollacheck rode a Killacycle using lead acid batteries at a speed of 244.73 km/h (152.07 mph).

In 2006, Vectrix introduced the VX-1. Following insolvency and initial bankruptcy reorganization, the Gold Peak battery group purchased the company in 2009. Vectrix expanded product lines, offering the VX-2 and the three wheeled VX-3 but ceased operations in January 2014 and filed for Chapter 7 bankruptcy liquidation, with its remaining assets auctioned off.

On April 4–5, 2009, Zero Motorcycles hosted the "24 Hours of Electricross" event in San Jose. It is considered the first all-electric off-road endurance race.

On June 14, 2009, the first electric Time Trial Xtreme Grand Prix (TTXGP) all-electric street motorcycle race took place on the Isle of Man in which 13 machines took part. Rob Barber riding a motorcycle built by Team Agni won the race. He completed the 60.72 km (37.73 miles) course in 25 minutes 53.5 seconds, an average speed of 140.711 km/h (87.434 mph).

In February 2009, Mission Motors started selling the Mission One. In September 2009, Jeremy Cleland broke the AMA electric motorcycle land speed record during the BUB Motorcycle Speed Trials at the Bonneville Salt Flats in Utah, US riding a Mission One. The bike registered a speed of 241.497 km/h (150.059 mph).

=== 2010s ===
In 2010 John Scollon broke the electric motorcycle record record time to climb Pikes Peak on an ElectroCat, created by mechanical engineer Eva Håkansson. He completed the 19 km (12 miles) course in 16 minutes 55.849 seconds. ElectroCat uses batteries manufactured by A123 Systems.

On June 26, 2011, Chip Yates broke Scollon's previous record at Pikes Peak. He completed the course in 12 minutes 50.094 seconds. On 30 August 2011, Yates riding his prototype Swigz electric superbike established the official Guinness record of the fastest electric motorcycle. The motorcycle clocked a speed of 316.899 km/h (196.912 mph) at Bonneville.

In 2012, Paul Ernst Thede set an SCTA record run of 348.9 km/h (216.8 mph) at Bonnevile Salt Flats, Utah, US. This did not qualify as a Guinness World record as it wasn't timed by the FIM timing association.

In 2012, Electro Force cycles made their debut as a commuter cycle for commuters to ride to work or for enjoyment. These cycles were built by Jennifer Northern of Issaquah, Washington, US. The maximum speed reached was 137 km/h (85 mph), while immediate speeds reached up to 97 km/h (60 mph) in 6 seconds, programmable with regenerative braking or on the throttle. Their range was up to 100 miles while maintaining 105 km/h (65 mph) in all weather and hills. It was the first of their kind built by a woman in the US.

In 2012, Jim Higgins rode the street-legal Mission Motors' Mission R at the Sonoma Raceway quarter-mile drag strip and set a National Electric Drag Racing Association (NEDRA) street-legal electric motorcycle record for the SMC/A3 class with a time of 10.602 at 197.26 km/h (122.57 mph).

On June 30, 2013, Carlin Dunne riding a Lightning Motorcycle-built electric bike beat conventional motorcycles at Pikes Peak. He clocked a 10 minutes 00.694 seconds at the 20.0 km (12.42 miles) course.

In the later 2010s, many companies tried their first crack at making an electric motorcycle or scooter, including Scorpio Electric and Harley-Davidson. On November 20, 2018, VinFast from Vietnam introduced two electric scooter models in Hanoi, with 4 model: VinFast Klara A1 (Lithium-ion battery), VinFast Klara A2 (Lead–acid battery), VinFast Ludo and VinFast Impes.

In 2019, the Lark Streamliner, a streamliner motorcycle, was built to challenge a land speed record in its class.

=== 2020s ===
In the 2020s many companies have started and many have folded. The cost of batteries and the speed of charging are still limiting factors in making appealing long-range motorcycles but in-city commuting, motocross, trials, and pleasure riding have seen significant adoption. In 2026, Michael Hicks won silver at World Supercross on a Stark Varg.

India's OLA S1 Pro Gen 2 Electric Scooter is a market leader and has sold more than 800,000 scooters.

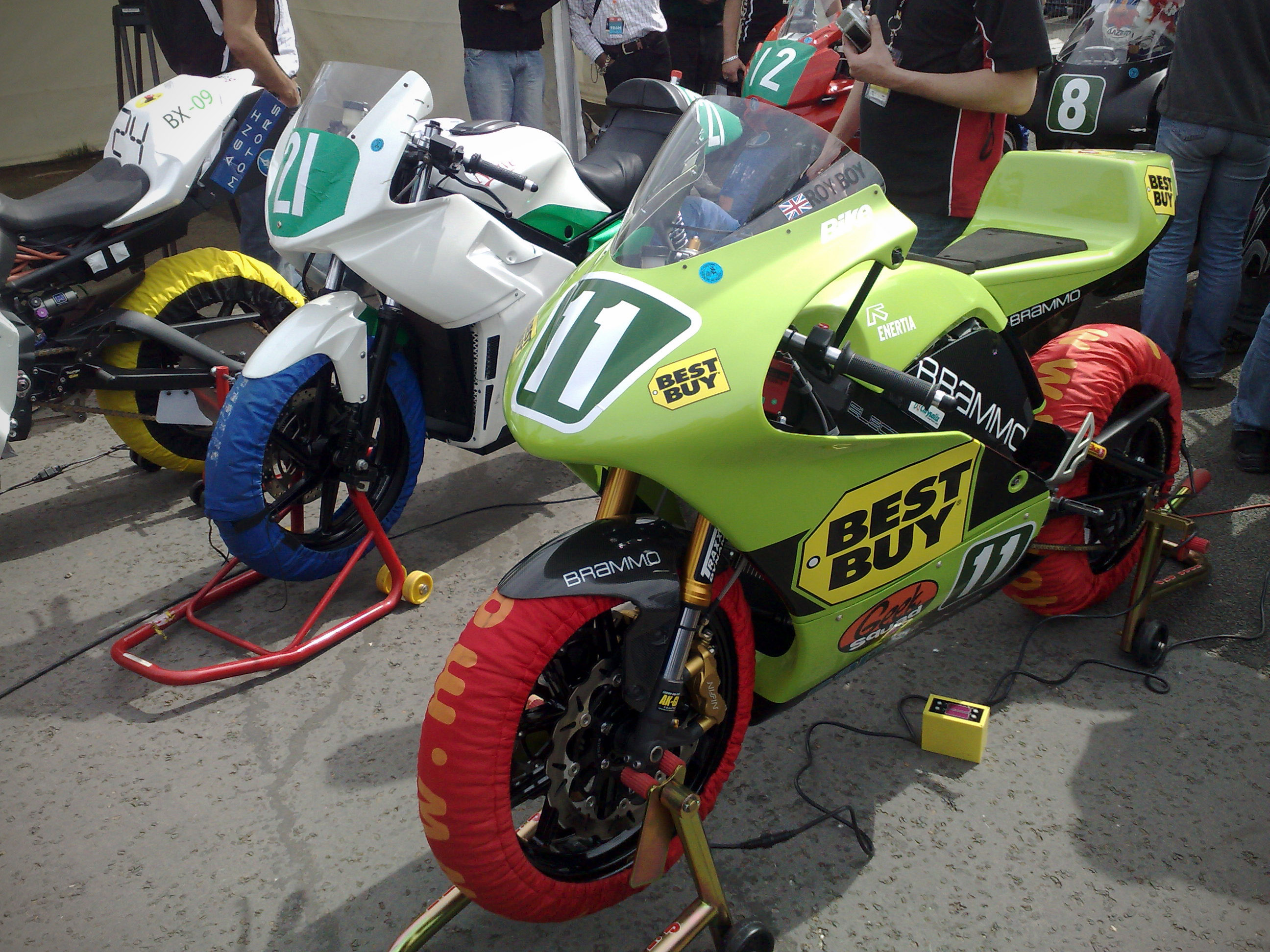
TTXGP bikes at Isle of Man TT 2009

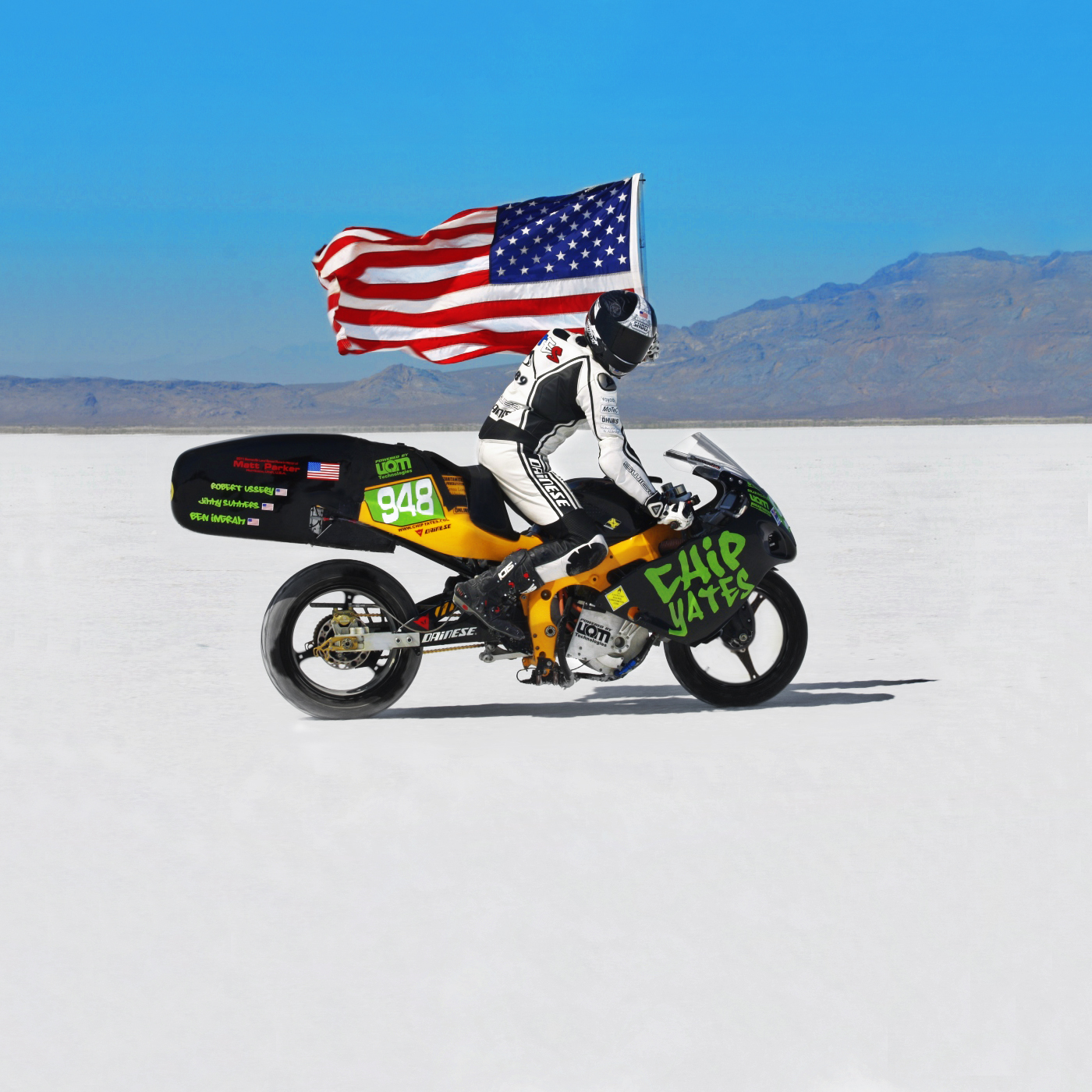
Chip Yates at Bonneville Salt Flats in 2011

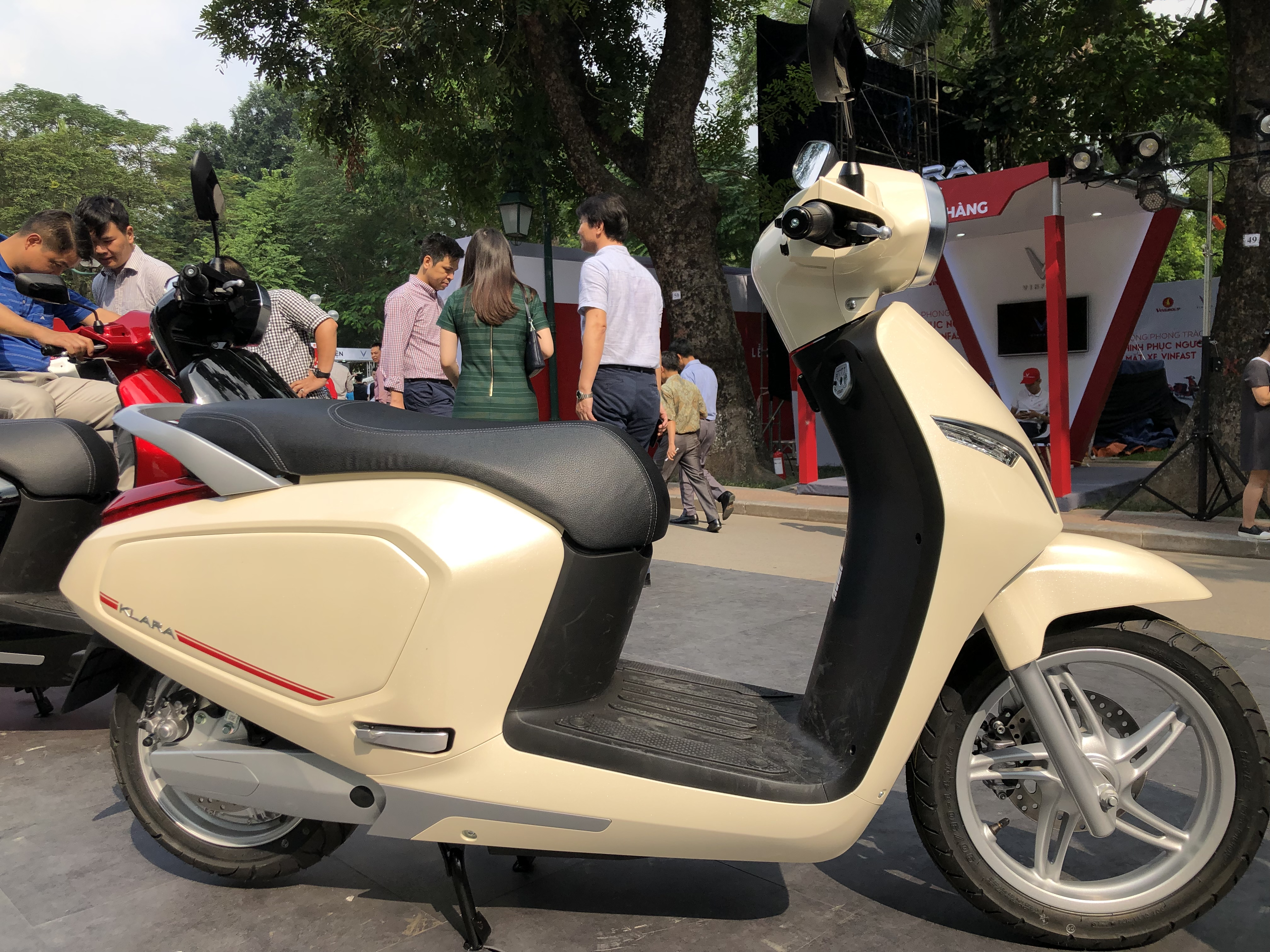
Cream VinFast Klara electric scooter

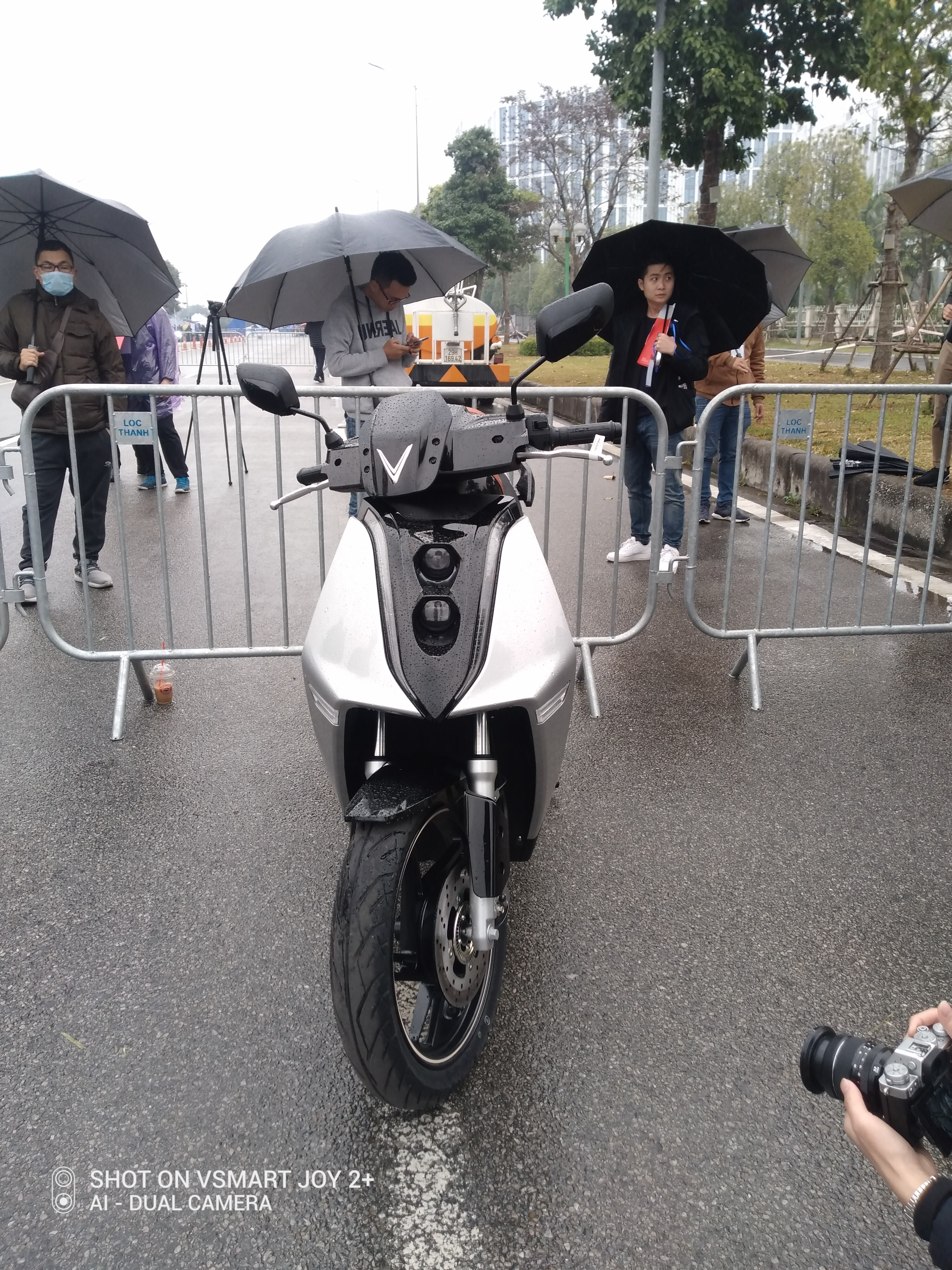
VinFast Theon S in 2022 at VinHomes Riverside

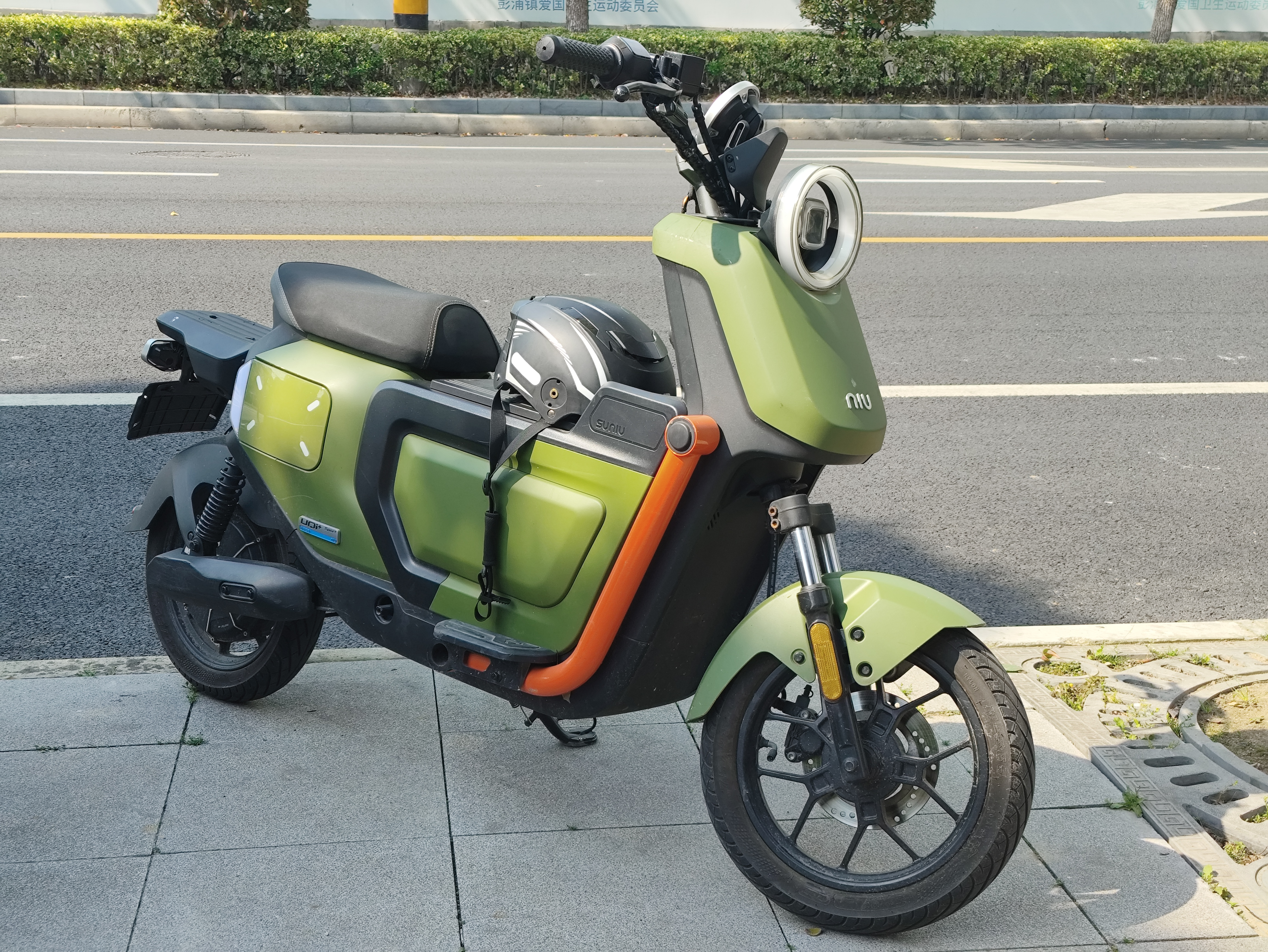
Niu UQi Sport in Shanghai, 2026

== Types ==
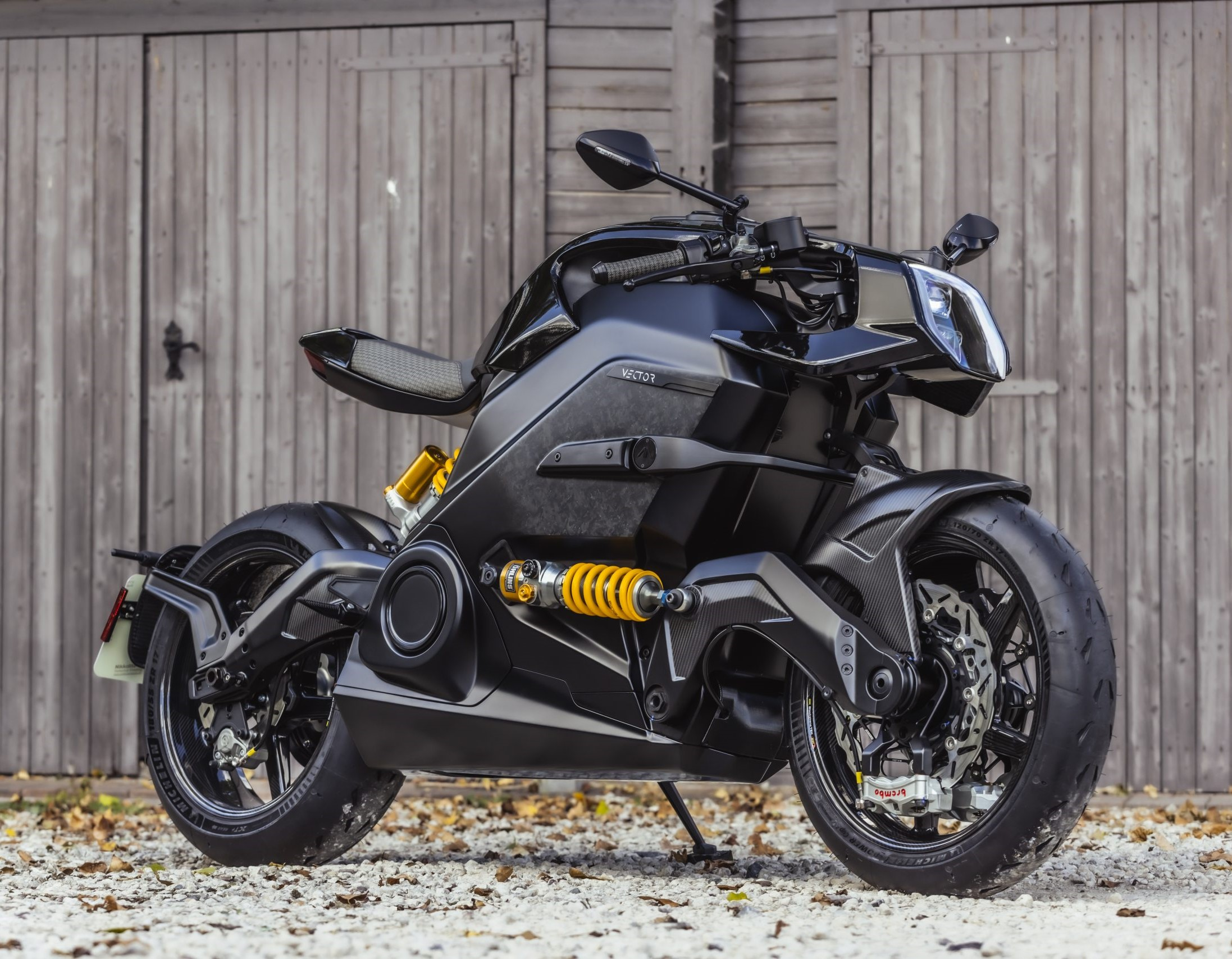
Electric motorcycle
Rider sits astride frame

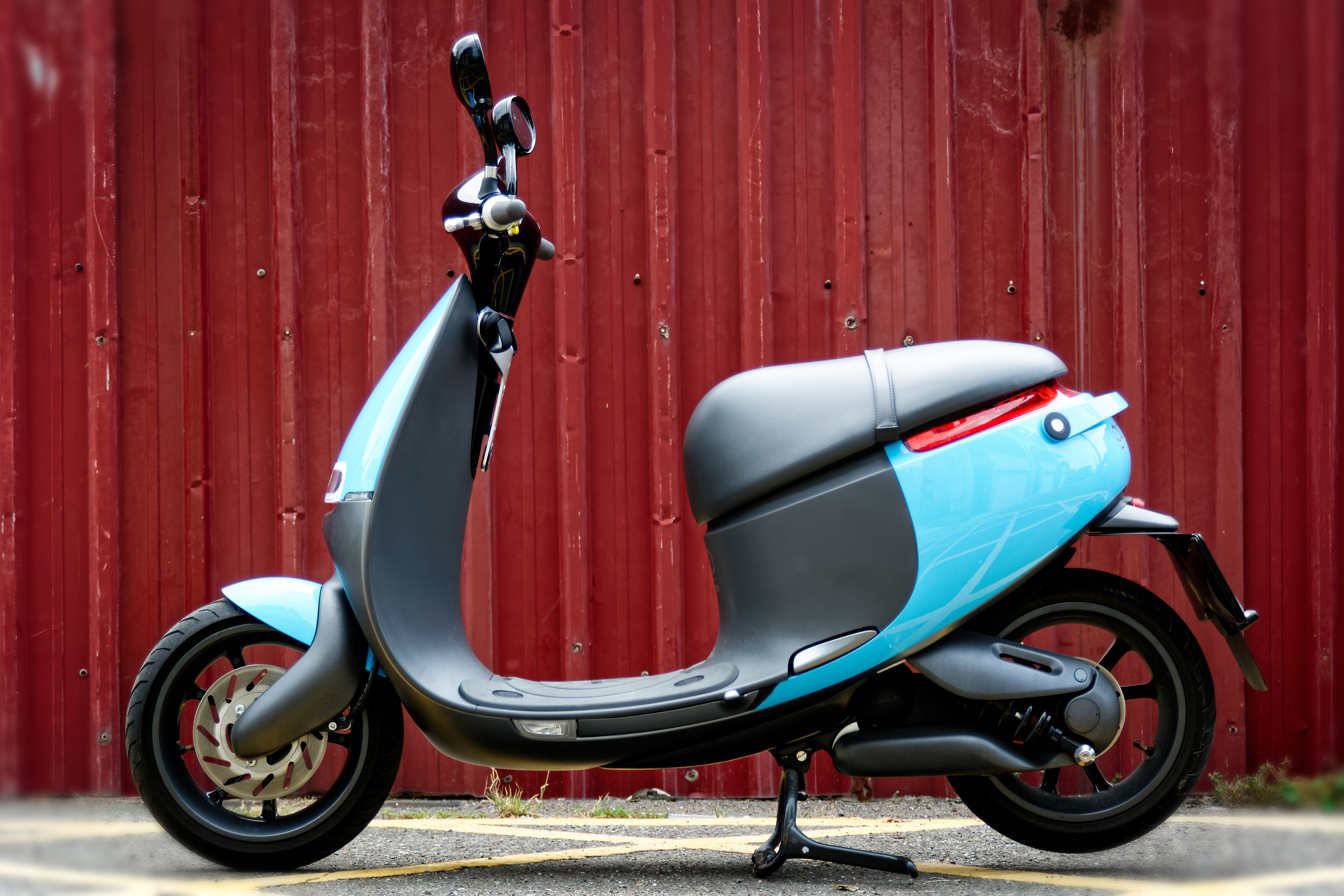
Electric scooter
Step-through frame with floor panel

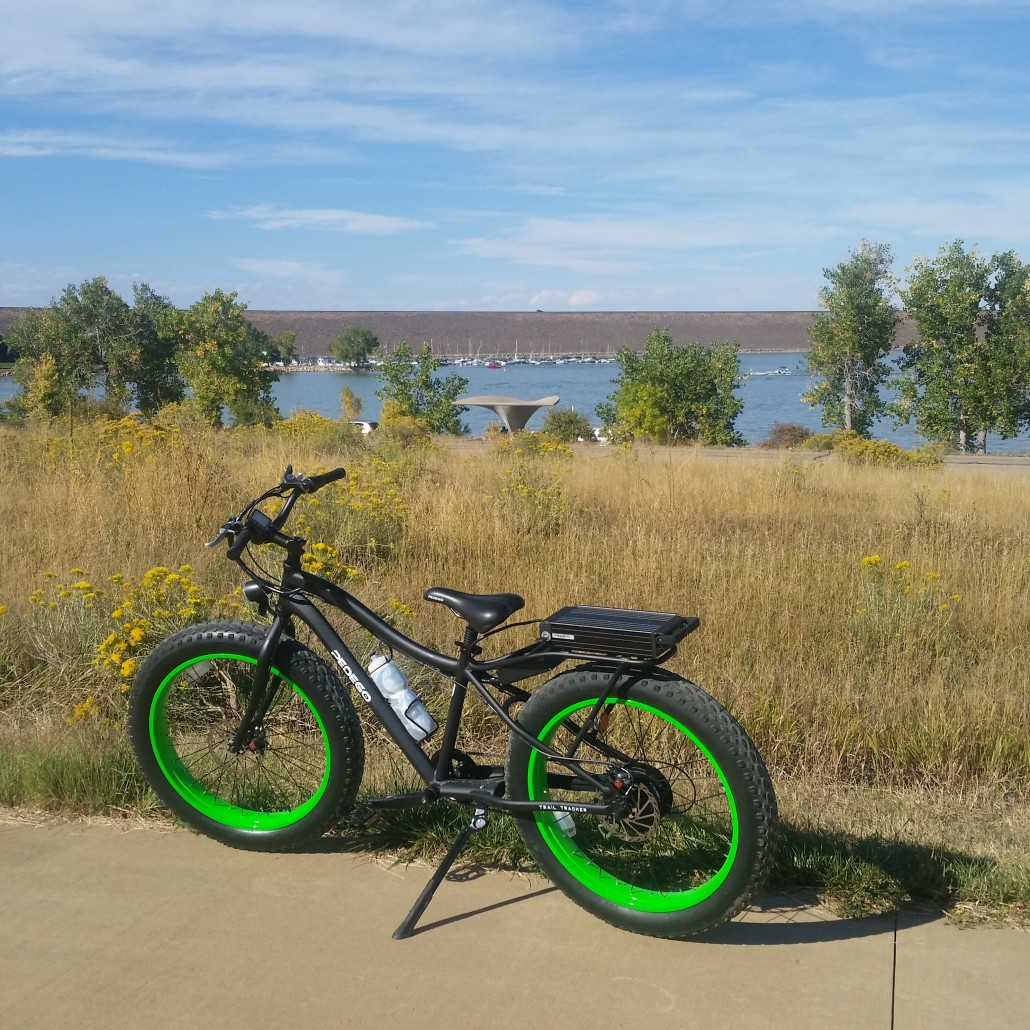
Electric bicycle
Retains pedals; motor used to assist

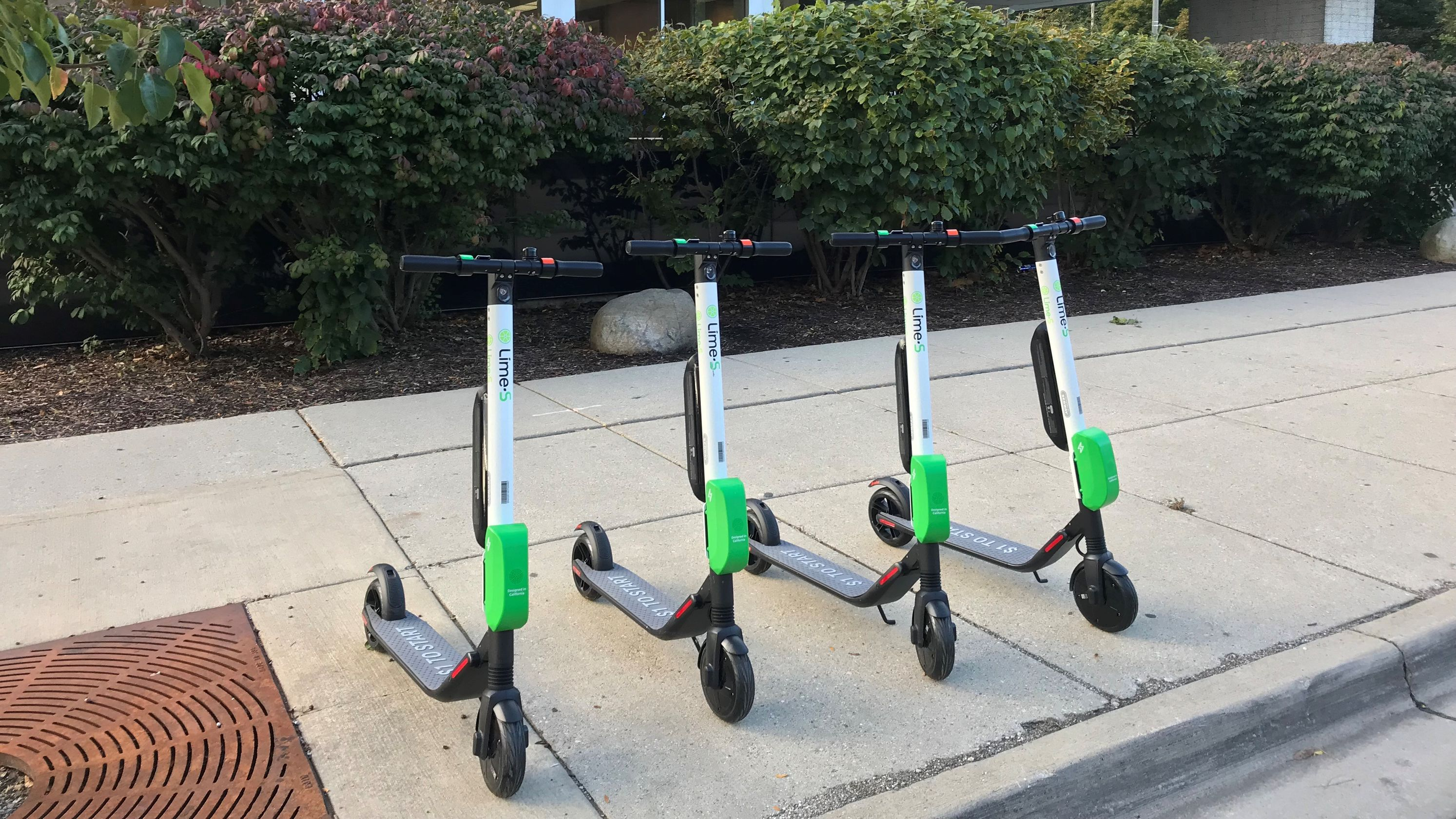
e-scooter
Standing deck

A two- (or sometimes three-) wheeled powered vehicle if ridden with rider astride is termed a motorcycle; if it has a step-through frame with rider seated with feet on a floor panel it is a motor scooter. A smaller vehicle, typically just a deck to stand on with two (or three) wheels and a handlebar on a vertical stem is also termed a scooter; such scooters if unpowered are termed kick scooters, and e-scooters if battery powered. E-scooters are made available for hire by several companies in a scooter-sharing system.

== Power source ==
Since electric motorcycles and scooters have relatively small frames, they typically have short ranges, restricted by the volume available for energy storage.

Most electric motorcycles and scooters are powered by rechargeable lithium ion batteries, though some early models used nickel–metal hydride batteries.

Alternative types of batteries are available. Z Electric Vehicle pioneered use of a battery with lead electrodes and an electrolyte of a liquid low sodium silicate compound, a variation on the classic lead–acid battery invented in 1859 and still used for electrical power in internal-combustion-engine automobiles, that compares favorably with lithium batteries in size, weight, and energy capacity, at considerably less cost.

EGen says its lithium-iron phosphate batteries are up to two-thirds lighter than lead-acid batteries and offer the best battery performance for electric vehicles.

In 2017, the first vehicle in the US to use the new Lithium Titanium Oxide (LTO) battery non-flammable battery technology was a scooter called The Expresso. This technology allows a battery to charge in less than 10 minutes, and is capable of 25,000 charges, the equivalent of 70 years of daily charges. The technology, created by Altairnano, is used in China, where over 10,000 urban buses run on these batteries.

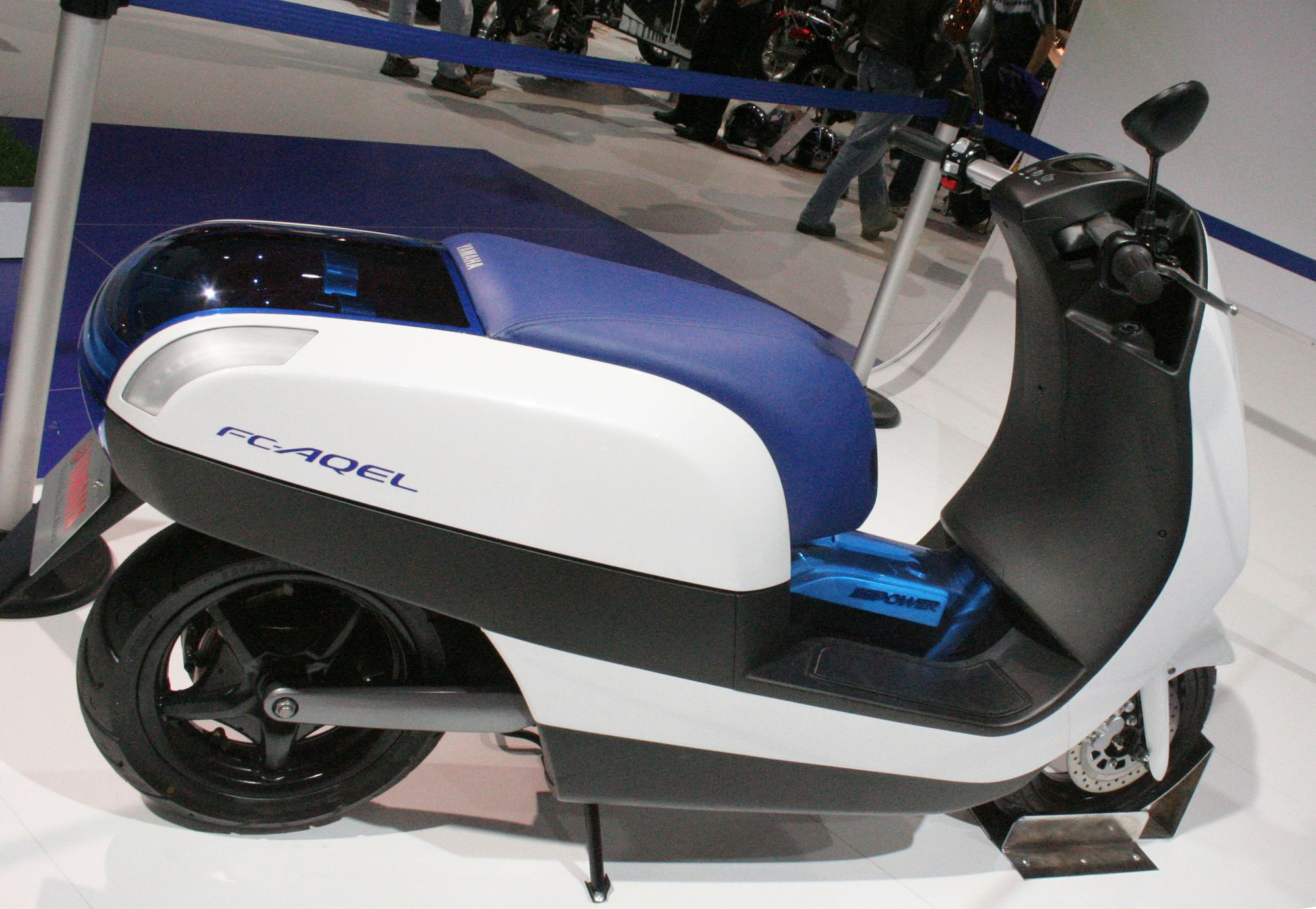
Yamaha FC-AQEL (fuel cell prototype)

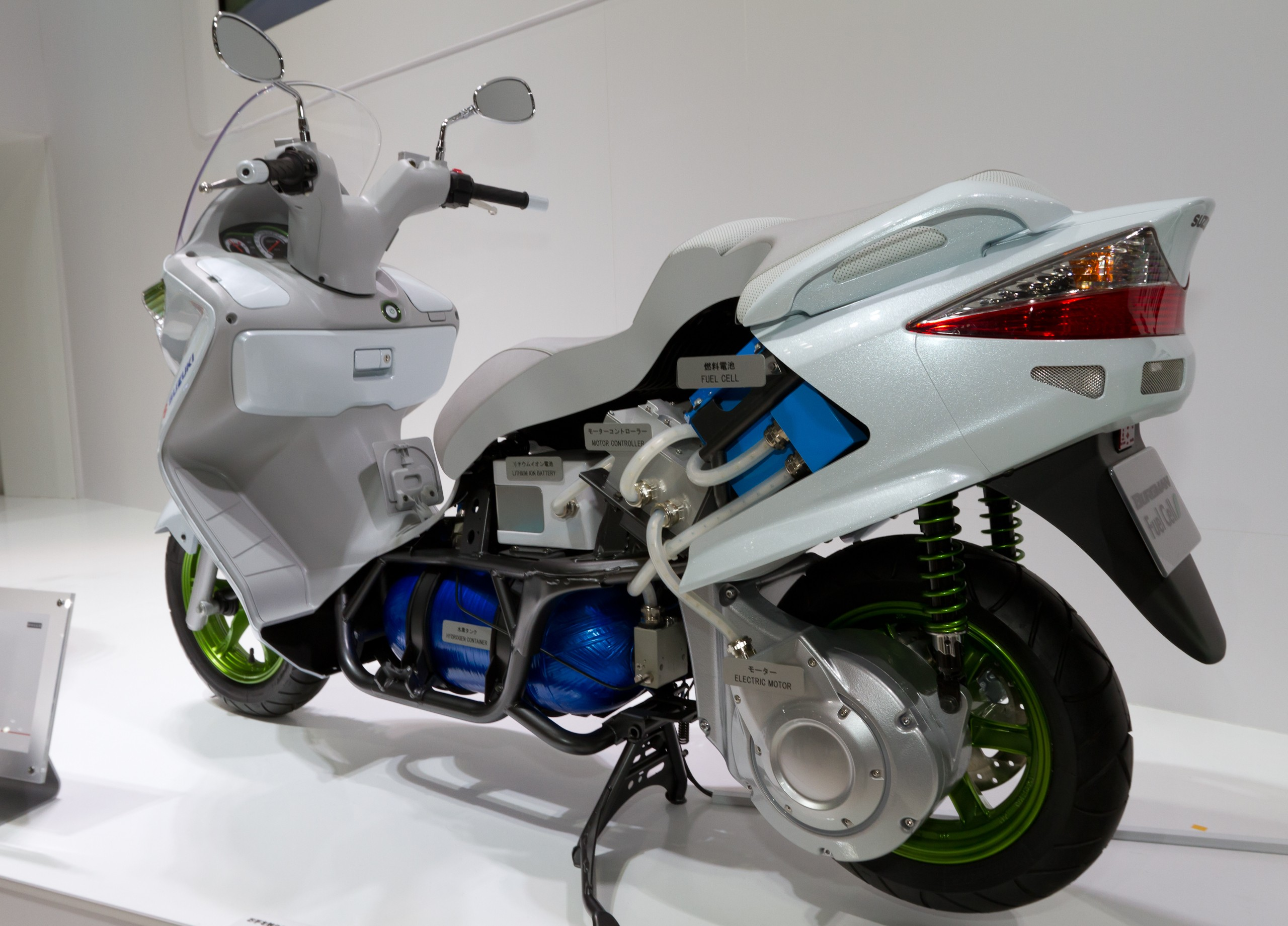
Suzuki Burgman (fuel cell prototype)

=== Charging ===
All electric scooters and motorcycles provide for recharging by plugging into ordinary wall outlets, usually taking about eight hours to recharge (i.e., overnight). Some manufacturers have designed in, included, or offer as an accessory, the high-power CHAdeMO level 2 charger, which can charge the batteries up to 95% in an hour.

=== Battery swapping ===
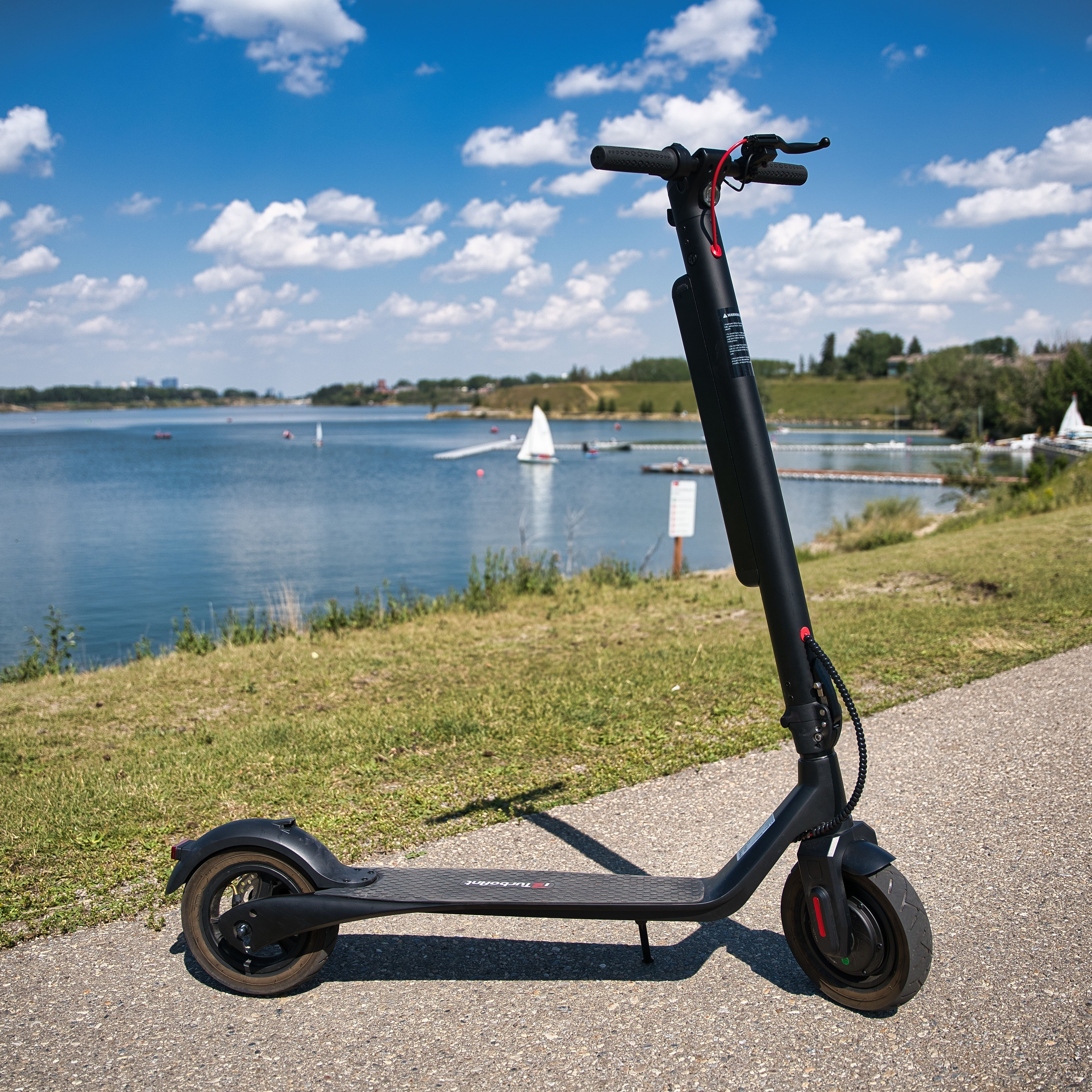
TurboAnt e-scooter with detachable battery on stem

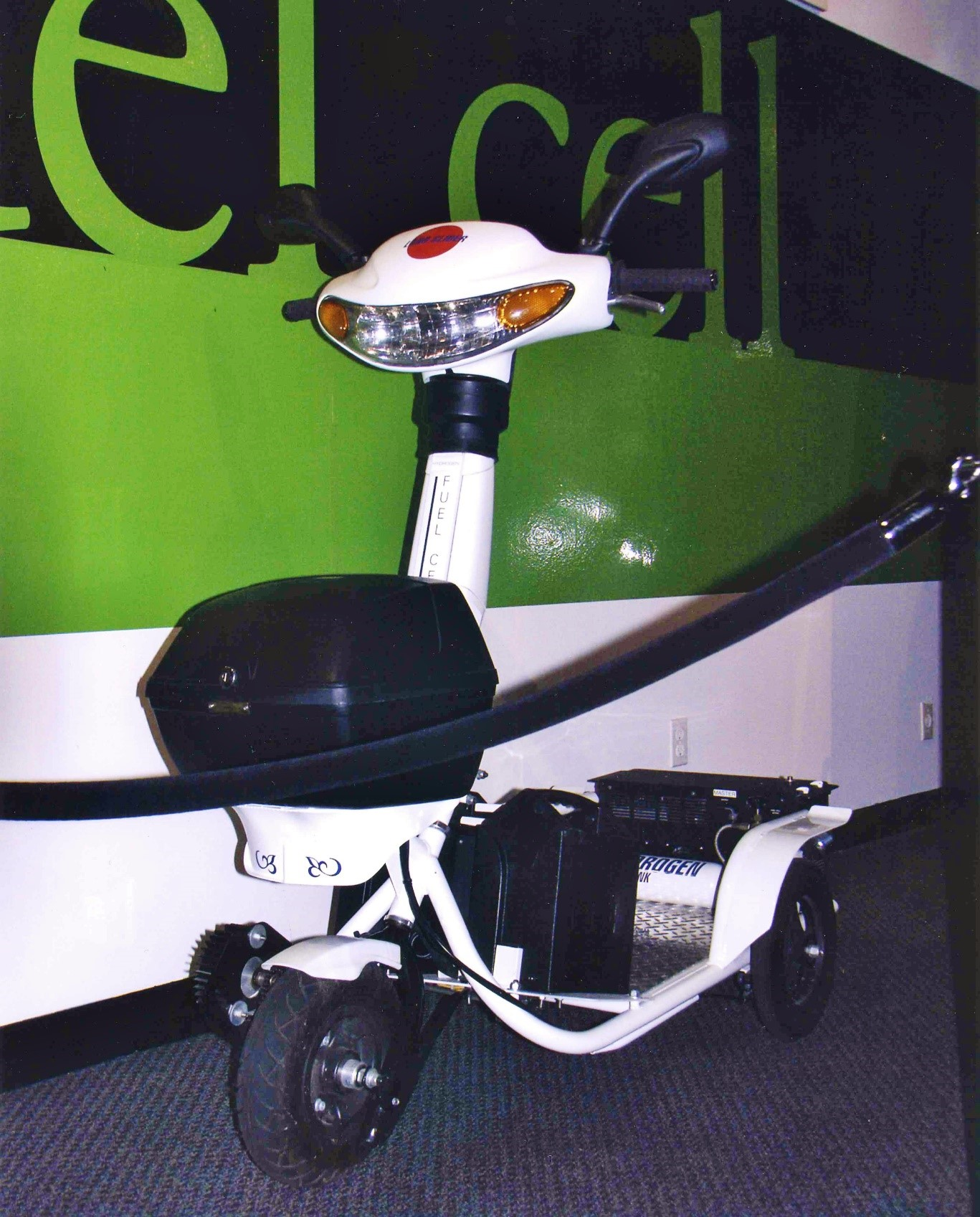
The Fuel-Cell Battery-Swap Land Glider, designed by Todd Bank, at the Petersen Automotive Museum in Los Angeles, 2005

Manufacturers like Zero Motorcycles and recent entrants to the scooter market Nanu EV, Gogoro, Unu, and TurboAnt have designed machines which allow quick battery swapping, to allow charging without the vehicle needing to be near a charge point, or, with a spare battery or an available battery network, to allow continued travel after a battery is drained.

In the mid-1990s, Personal Electric Transports-Hawaii (formerly Suntera, now P.E.T.) was making a 113 km/h (70 mph) capable 3-wheel enclosed-electric motorcycle called the Sunray – designed by noted solar EV pioneer Jonnathan Tennyson. The Sunray's battery cartridge was on rollers and slid out of the front of the vehicle so it could be swapped out for a freshly charged battery at a battery-swap station conveniently located along a highway or in a city. P.E.T. also had a streamlined two-wheel seated motor scooter called Caballito – designed by Budd Steinhilbur, who was a well known designer of the Tucker 48 automobile. Budd's Caballitos were also adapted for battery-swapping at P.E.T.’s future battery-swap stations. In 2000, P.E.T. added light-electric motorcycle and scooter visionary Todd Bank to their team and P.E.T. secured major funding from the Los Angeles Department of Water and Power to design and prototype the first battery-swap station's for light-electric vehicles and NEV's. P.E.T. prototypes and designs are now on display at museums across America.

Battery swapping is popular in India, with Sun Mobility planning modular batteries. "A moped would require one, a rickshaw two and a car four."

=== Hybrid ===
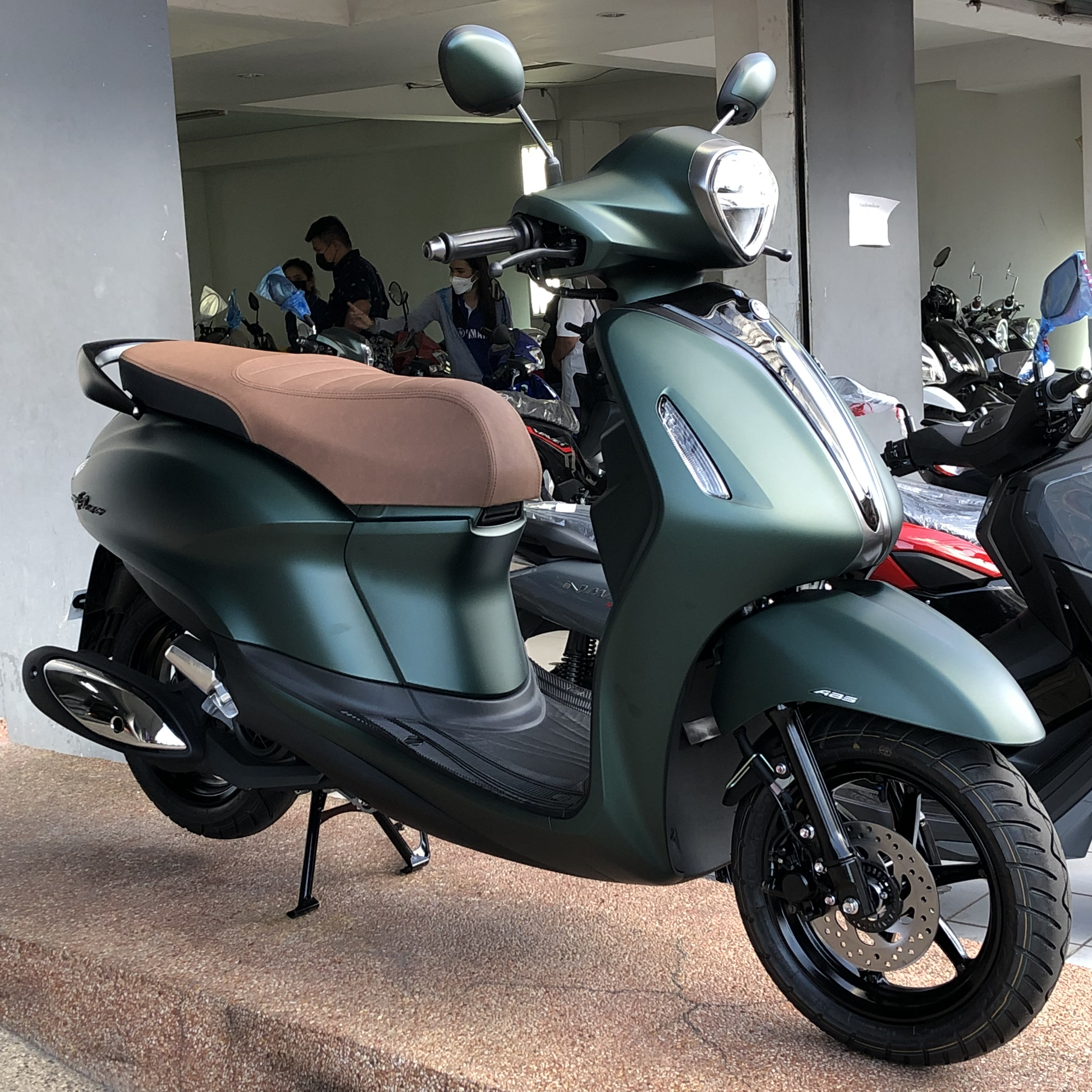
A 2022 Yamaha Grand Filano, a hybrid scooter

Honda has developed an experimental internal combustion/electric hybrid scooter. Yamaha has also developed a hybrid concept motorcycle called Gen-Ryu. It uses a 600 cc engine and an additional electric motor. Piaggio MP3 Hybrid uses a 125 cc engine and an additional 2.4 kW motor.

=== Fuel cell ===
There are several experimental prototypes using fuel cell technology. ENV developed by Intelligent Energy is a hydrogen fuel cell prototype. The motorcycle has a range of 100 miles (160 km) and can reach a top speed of 80 km/h (50 mph). Suzuki has also developed a concept hydrogen fuel cell scooter based on the Suzuki Burgman. Yamaha has created a hydrogen fuel cell prototype called FC-AQEL, which is considered equivalent to a 125 cc vehicle. Honda has also developed a hydrogen fuel cell scooter which uses the Honda FC Stack.

== Electric vs. gasoline machines ==
=== Performance ===
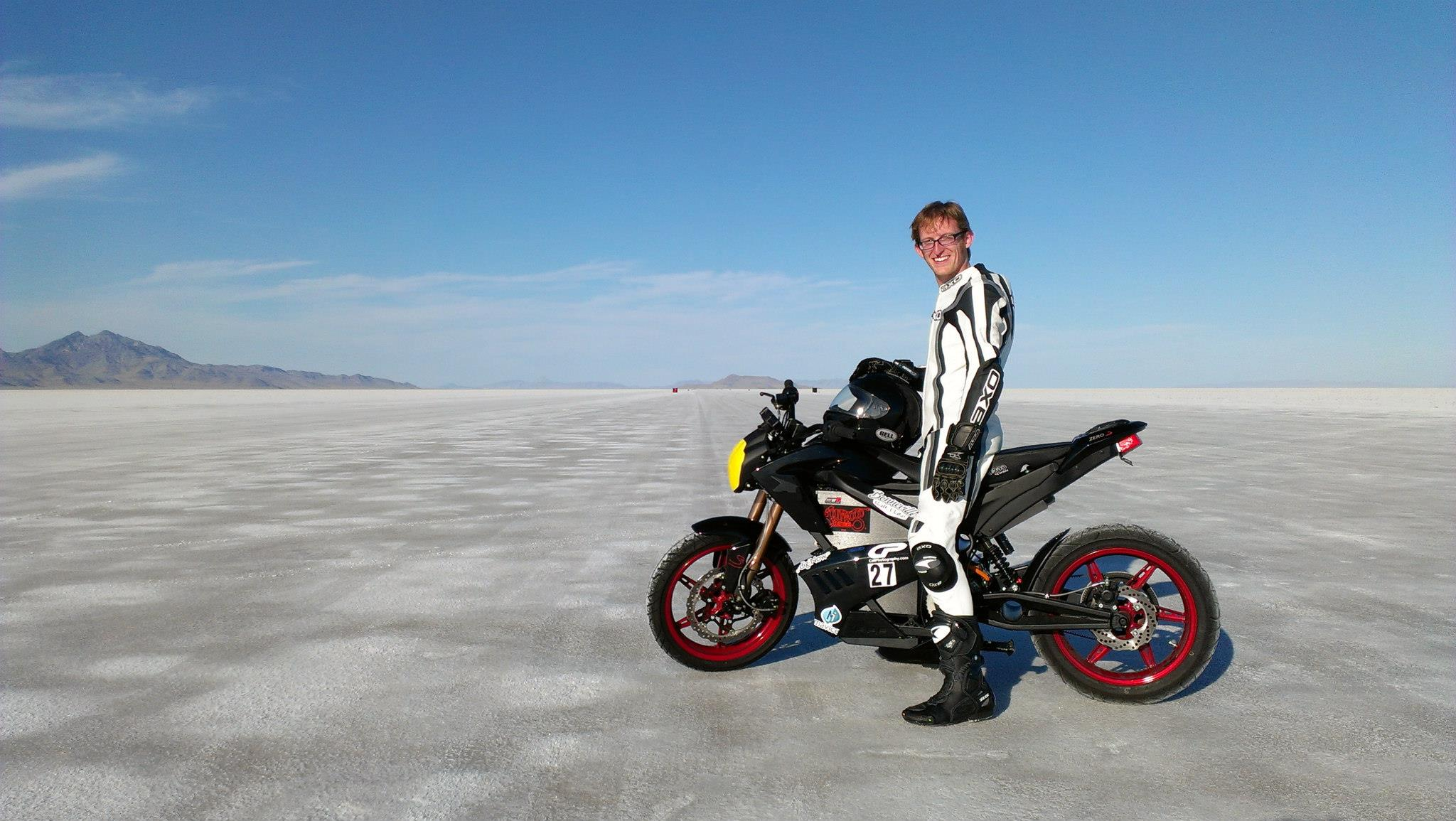
Brandon Nozaki Miller on the first production electric motorcycle to break 161 km/h (100 mph), a 2012 Zero S ZF6 at Bonneville Salt Flats (2012)

Electric and gasoline powered motorcycles and scooters of the same size and weight are roughly comparable in performance. In August 2013 Road & Track evaluated a high-end electric motorcycle as faster and better handling than any conventionally powered bike. Electric machines have better 0 to 60 acceleration, since they develop full torque immediately, and without a clutch the torque is instantly available.

=== Range ===
Electric motorcycles and scooters suffer considerable disadvantage in range, since batteries that fit in a motorcycle frame cannot store as much energy as a tank of gasoline. Anything over 130 miles (210 km) on a single charge is considered an exceptionally long range. Consequently, while electric machines excel for city dwellers traveling relatively short distances, on the open road riders experience inhibiting range anxiety. Electric power also trades off range against speed; for instance according to the manufacturer the long-range ZEV LRC electric scooter can travel 225 km (140 mi) at 88 km/h (55 mph), but the range drops to about 129 km (80 mi) at 112 km/h (70 mph).

Manufacturers are striving to increase range; as of 2022 a range of 259 km (161 miles) was reported. At the other end of the scale, much shorter ranges such as 64 km (40 miles) were available at very much lower cost.

=== Maintenance ===
Electric scooters and motorcycles need very little maintenance. As Wired magazine's transportation editor Damon Lavrinc reported after an experiment of trying to go six months using nothing but a Zero electric motorcycle: "[w]ith only a battery, a motor, and a black box (i.e. the controller) to keep you moving, electric motorcycles are a breeze to maintain compared to a conventional motorcycle, what with all the lubricating and adjusting and tuning you have to do. You basically just worry about consumables: brake pads, tires, maybe a brake fluid flush. That's about it." Electric scooters and motorcycles equipped with regenerative braking typically have longer brake pad life because a significant portion of braking duty can be performed with the electric motor instead of the mechanical friction brakes.

=== Fuel cost ===
At between one and two cents per mile (depending on electric rates), electric machines enjoy an enormous fuel cost advantage. Three months and 2,800 km (1,700 mi) of commuting on an electric motorcycle cost Lavrinc less than $30 for electricity; on a BMW gasoline bike a single trip of 650 km (400 mi) cost nearly the same. In Australia, UBCO battery Electric Motorbike running cost is 88¢ per 100 km. In India, Ampere Electric Scooter's running cost is at Rs. 0.15 per km.

=== Recharging time ===
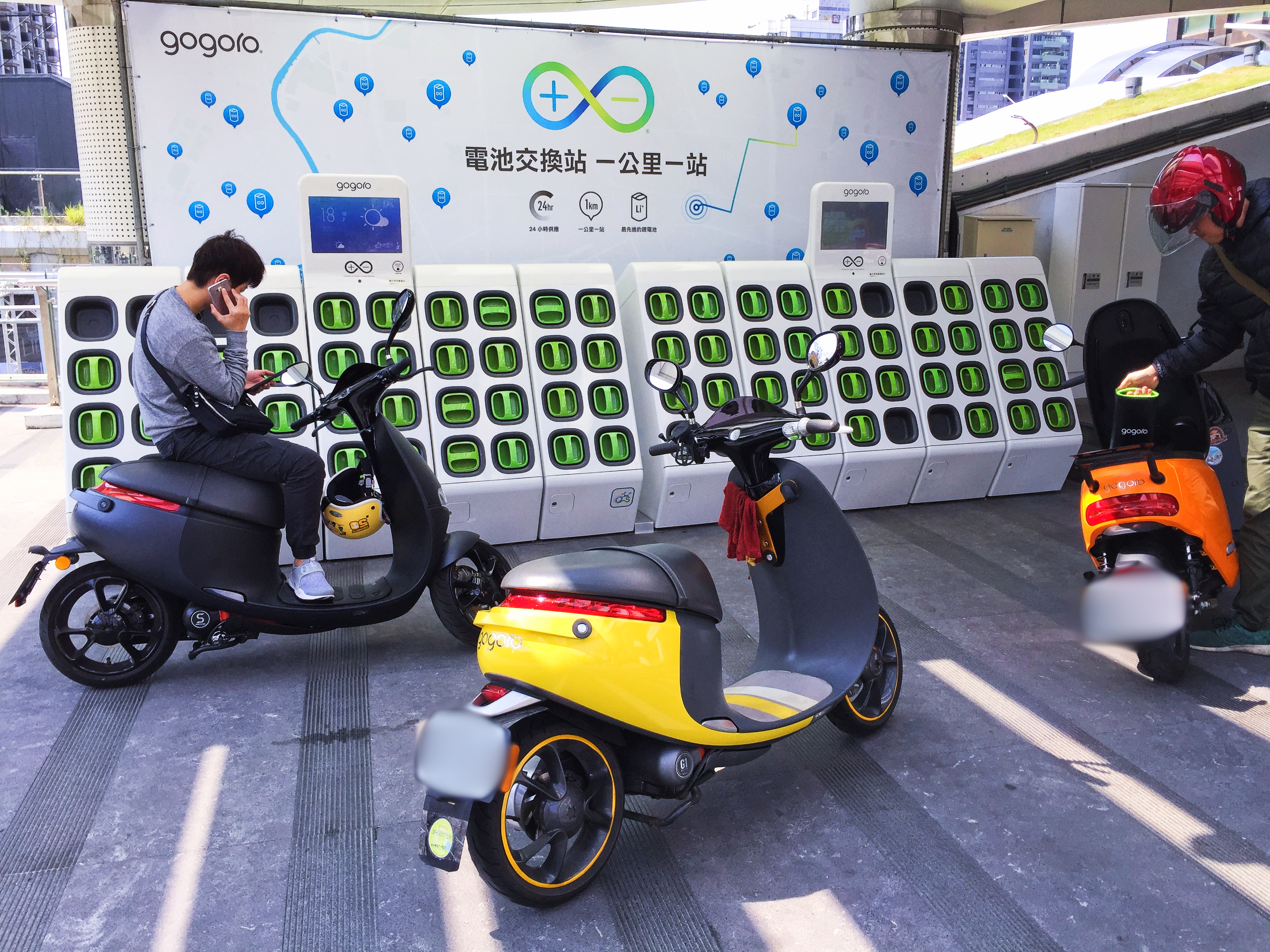
A battery station, the person on the right is swapping a depleted battery for a charged one

Even with special equipment, charging a battery takes significantly longer than filling a gasoline tank. With the maximum number of accessory chargers, it takes over an hour to charge a Zero S ZF6.5's 6.5 kWh battery to 95% capacity. This refuel time also increases with battery capacity; the Zero S ZF13.0 (which has a 13 kWh battery) takes over 2 hours to charge to 95% capacity using the maximum number of accessory. This affects journeys longer than the single-charge range of a motorcycle.

=== Noise ===
Electric vehicles are far quieter than gasoline powered ones, so that they may approach a pedestrian who is not watching unnoticed. Some are equipped to produce a warning sound as they travel and the UK is running trials to see if escooters with artificial noise are safer. Popular Mechanics called the comparative quiet of electric motorcycles the greatest difference between them and their gasoline counterparts, and a safety bonus because the rider can hear danger approaching. Whether a loud motorcycle is safer than a quiet one due to being more noticeable is a matter of dispute. At high speed the whine of a typical electric motorcycle is said to sound "like a spaceship".

On the other hand, electric motorcycles contribute much less to noise pollution, although at high speeds wind and tire noise do become a significant portion of total vehicle noise.

== Sales and adoption ==
China leads the world in electric scooter sales, comprising 9.4 million of the total 12 million sold worldwide in 2013. As of November 2020, the number of electric scooters in China had reached around 300 million, with annual sales of more than 30 million units. There were only 31,338 electric scooter sales outside the Asia-Pacific region including Europe. The US market is comparatively small, with an estimated 2,000 sold in 2012.

While steadily becoming more practical, high prices and a limited range suited best for commuting have been impediments to electric motorcycles and scooters increasing their market share. In the US at least, cheaper motorcycles that can refuel in minutes at any gasoline station better suit weekend riders, the predominant users. According to a market report published in 2013, the sales of electric motorcycles and scooters in expected to rise over 10-fold by 2018 in North America, to about 36,000 by 2018.

In India, high costs and power grid problems have contributed to slow sales. In states like Tamil Nadu, where power supply of rationed electricity was reduced, a corresponding drop in sales has been observed by electric scooter manufacturers like Ampere, Hero Electric, Ola Electric and Ather Energy.

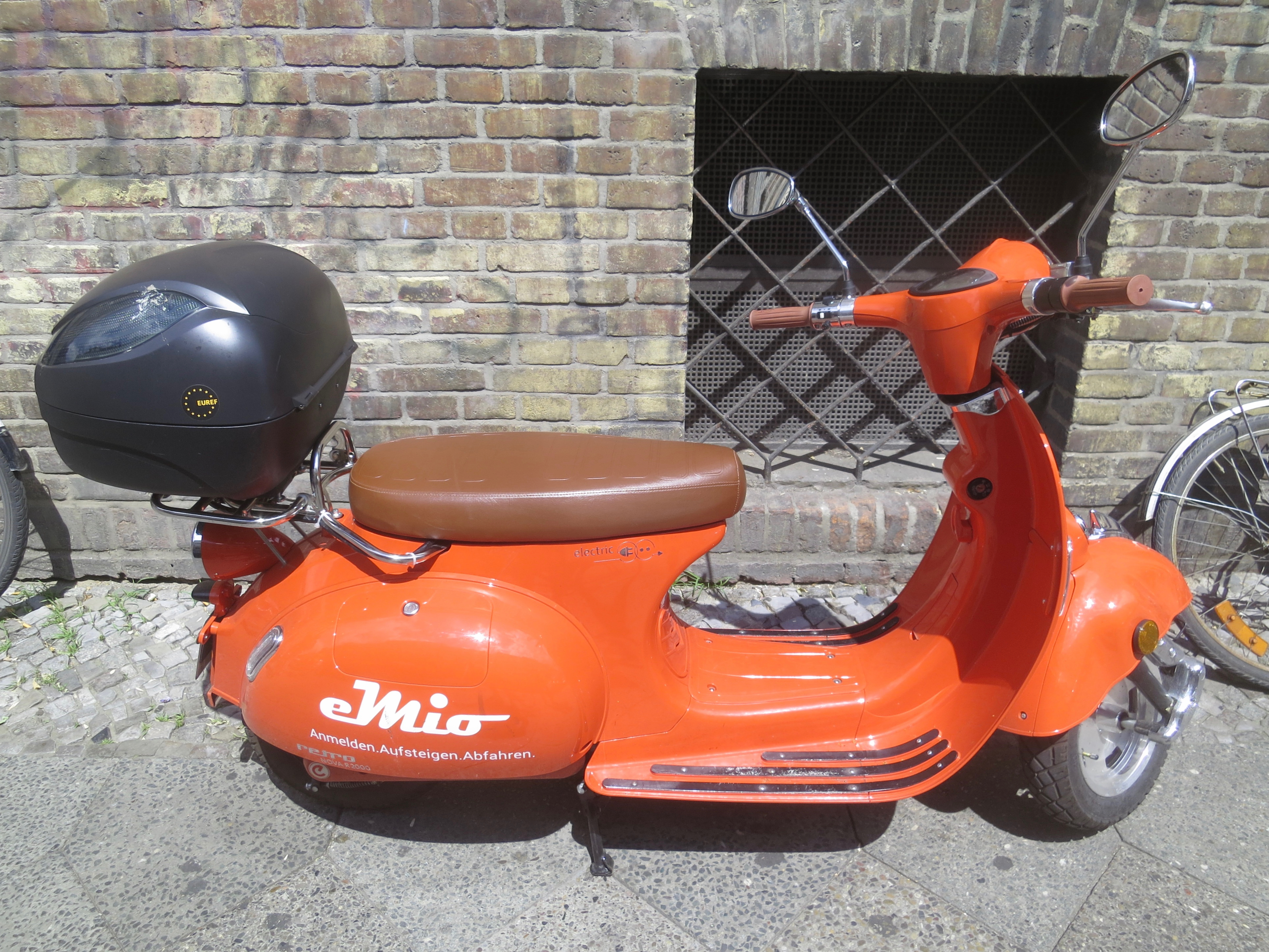
Electric Scooter in Berlin. Designed for an app-based sharing system.

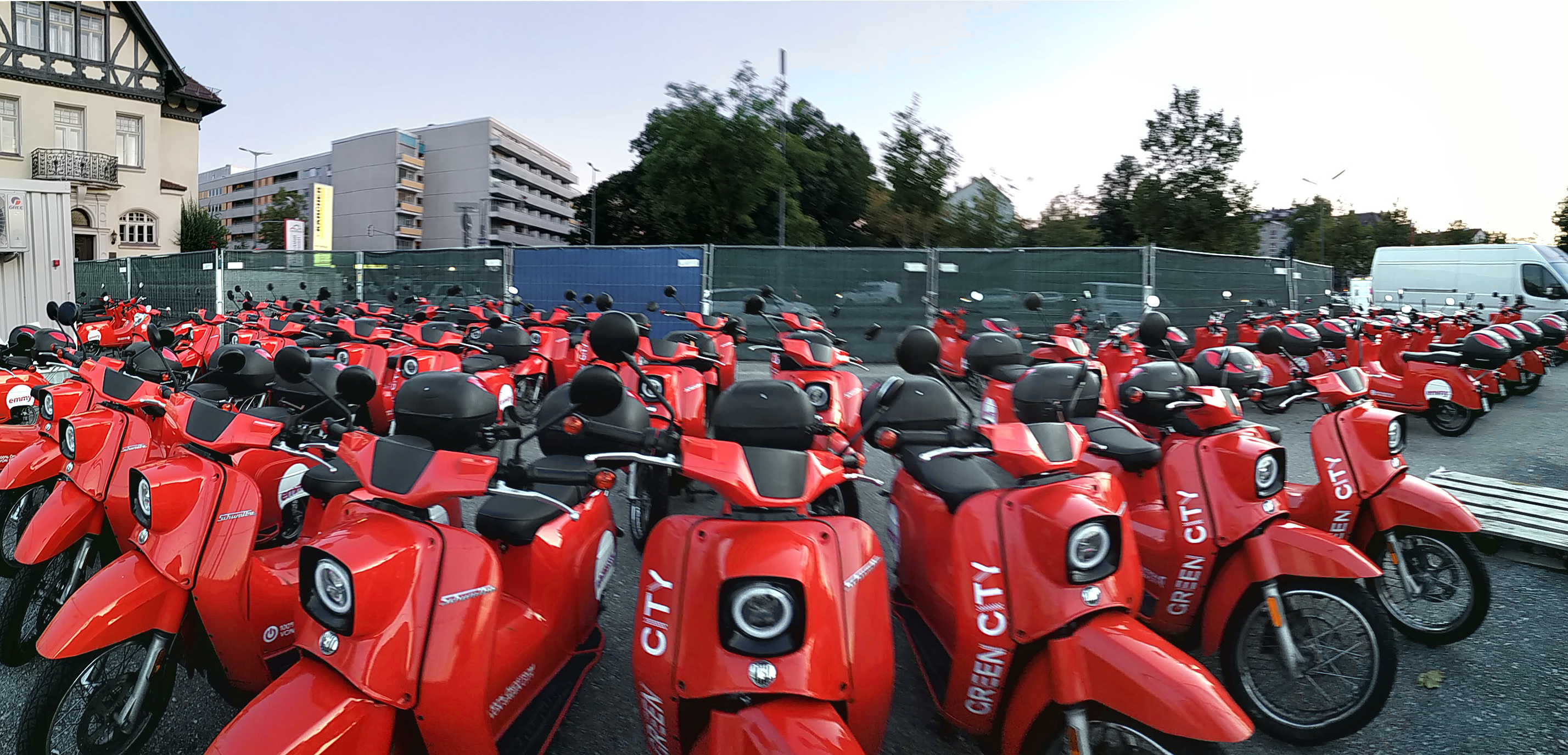
E-Scooters of scooter-sharing company Emmy in Munich (2019)

== Government promotion and incentives ==
=== India ===
In January 2013, the Indian government announced a plan to provide subsidies for hybrid and electric vehicles. The plan will have subsidies up to ₹150,000 (approximately US$2,200) for cars and ₹50,000 for two wheeled vehicles. India aimed to have seven million electric vehicles on the road by 2020. The scheme was launched in April 2019 using the name FAME, or Faster Adoption and Manufacturing of (Hybrid and) Electric vehicles.

=== Indonesia ===
The Indonesian government announced in March 2023 that it would allocate a total of Rp 7 trillion (US$455.88 million) to incentivize electric motorcycle sales through 2024. These funds will subsidize 800,000 new electric motorcycle sales and 200,000 conversions of existing internal combustion motorcycles to electric. Each new electric motorcycle sale will receive a Rp 7 million subsidy.

=== Taiwan ===
The premier of the Republic of China (Taiwan) Liu Chao-shiuan said in 2008 that the government-financed Industrial Technology Research Institute (ITRI) will help domestic manufacturers mass-produce 100,000 electric motorcycles in four years.

=== Senegal ===
In March 2022, Tamir Faye, Director General of ANPEJ, signed an agreement for the creation of 50,000 jobs to provide opportunities for young people by using electric motorcycles to strengthen the transport industry.

== Motorsports ==
=== MotoE World Championship ===
The FIM Enel MotoE World Championship (formerly known as the MotoE World Cup) is a class of motorcycle racing that uses only electric motorcycles. The series is sanctioned by the FIM and the inaugural season in 2019 was due to support MotoGP at five of the European circuits.

Having run as a World Cup from 2019 until 2022, MotoE officially gained World Championship status starting in 2023. The races are for 35 km (approx 8 laps).

=== Pikes Peak International Hill Climb (PPIHC) ===
The Pikes Peak International Hill Climb began in 1916 and is the second oldest motor sports race in the United States. The PPIHC is a long-standing tradition in the Colorado Springs and Pikes Peak Regions. The race takes place on a 12.42-mile (19.99 km) course beginning at an elevation of 9,390 ft (2,860 m), containing 156 turns and ending at the 14,110 ft (4,300 m) summit of Pikes Peak. One of the main obstacles of the race is the increasingly thin air that slows reflexes, diminishes muscle strength and reduces the power of internal combustion engines by 30 percent as competitors advance up the peak. The electric motorcycle division has an advantage with the all-electric motorcycles because they do not experience power loss with increased elevation and thinner air.

The Lightning Motorcycle Super-bike electric motorcycle set the fastest overall time in the motorcycle division, beating all gasoline powered motorcycles in 2013.

=== TT Zero ===
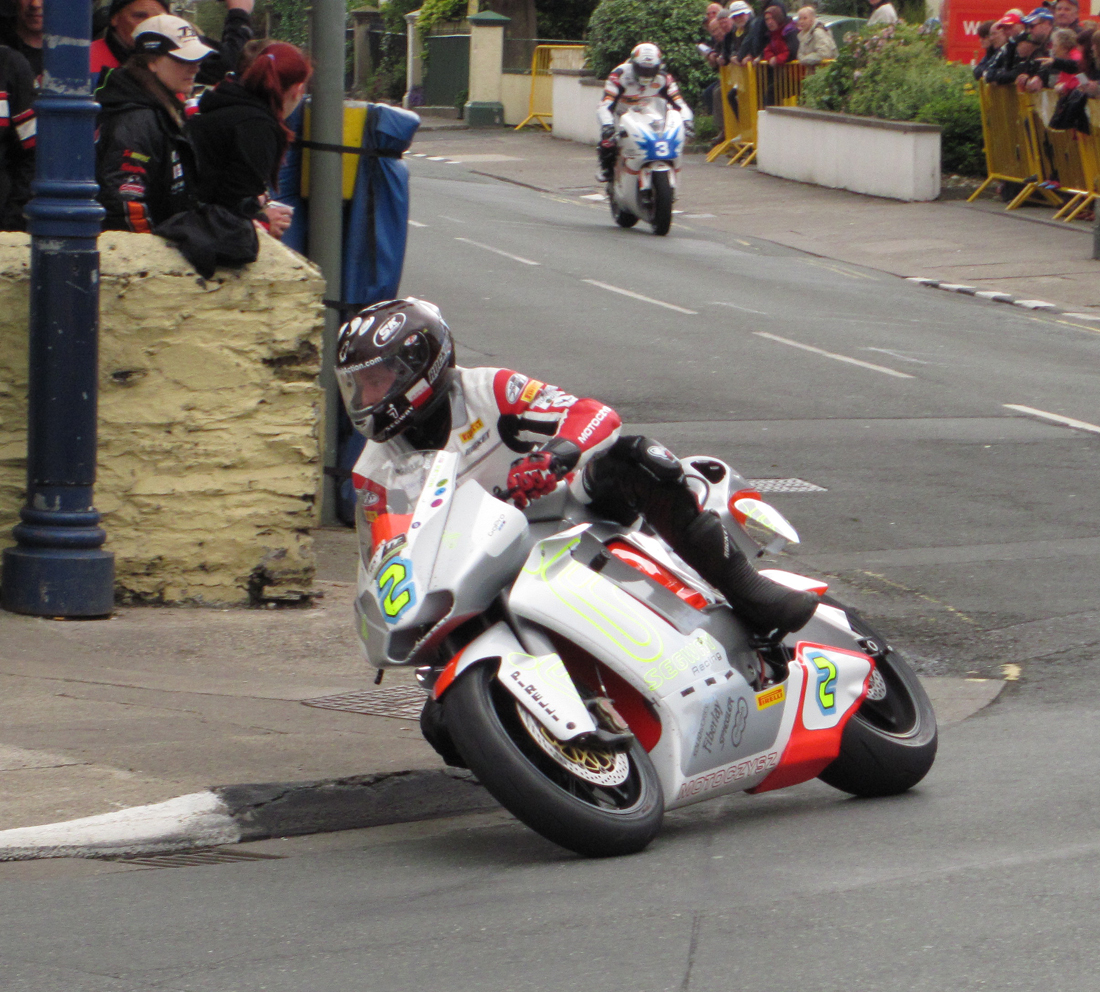
Mark Miller riding a MotoCzysz E1pc at TT Zero (2012)

TTXGP was conceived by Azhar Hussain. The first race was held on 30 June 2009 on the Isle of Man in which 13 teams took part. The event was endorsed by the Fédération Internationale de Motocyclisme (FIM). In May 2010, TTXGP started a world championship series. It went on to organize several races in US, Europe and Australia. In 2010, TT Zero replaced the TTXGP event in the Isle of Man TT race. Neither TTXGP nor Azhar Hussain were involved in the event. The event followed FIM rules.

=== FIM eRoad Racing World Cup ===
On 18 November 2010, Fédération Internationale de Motocyclisme (FIM) announced an ePower International Series for electric motorcycles, causing a split between TTXGP promoters and FIM. FIM, unlike TTXGP, was unable to gather many teams of the series. In March 2011, TTXGP announced it would again collaborate with FIM.

In 2013, TTXGP and FIM collaborated to organize the FIM eRoad Racing World Cup with races in US, Europe and a final race in Asia.

==== Motocross ====
In 2013, FIM announced an all-electric event, called E-MX, which was held in Belgium during Clean Week 2020 on 2 May. MiniMoto SX Energy Crisiscross is a regular event where electric off-road motorcycles are allowed to compete against conventional motorcycles.

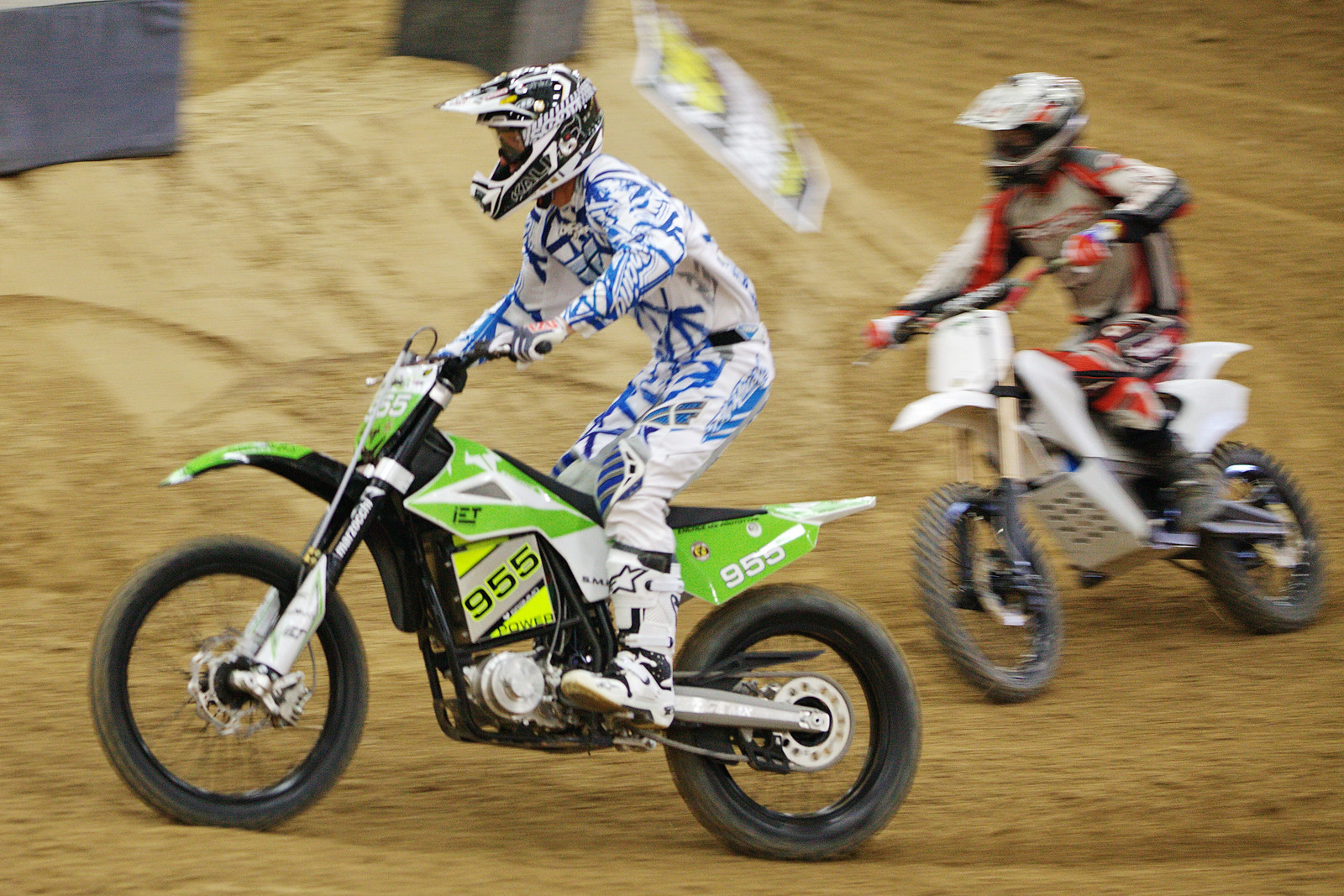
A Brammo Engage at MiniMoto SX (2011)

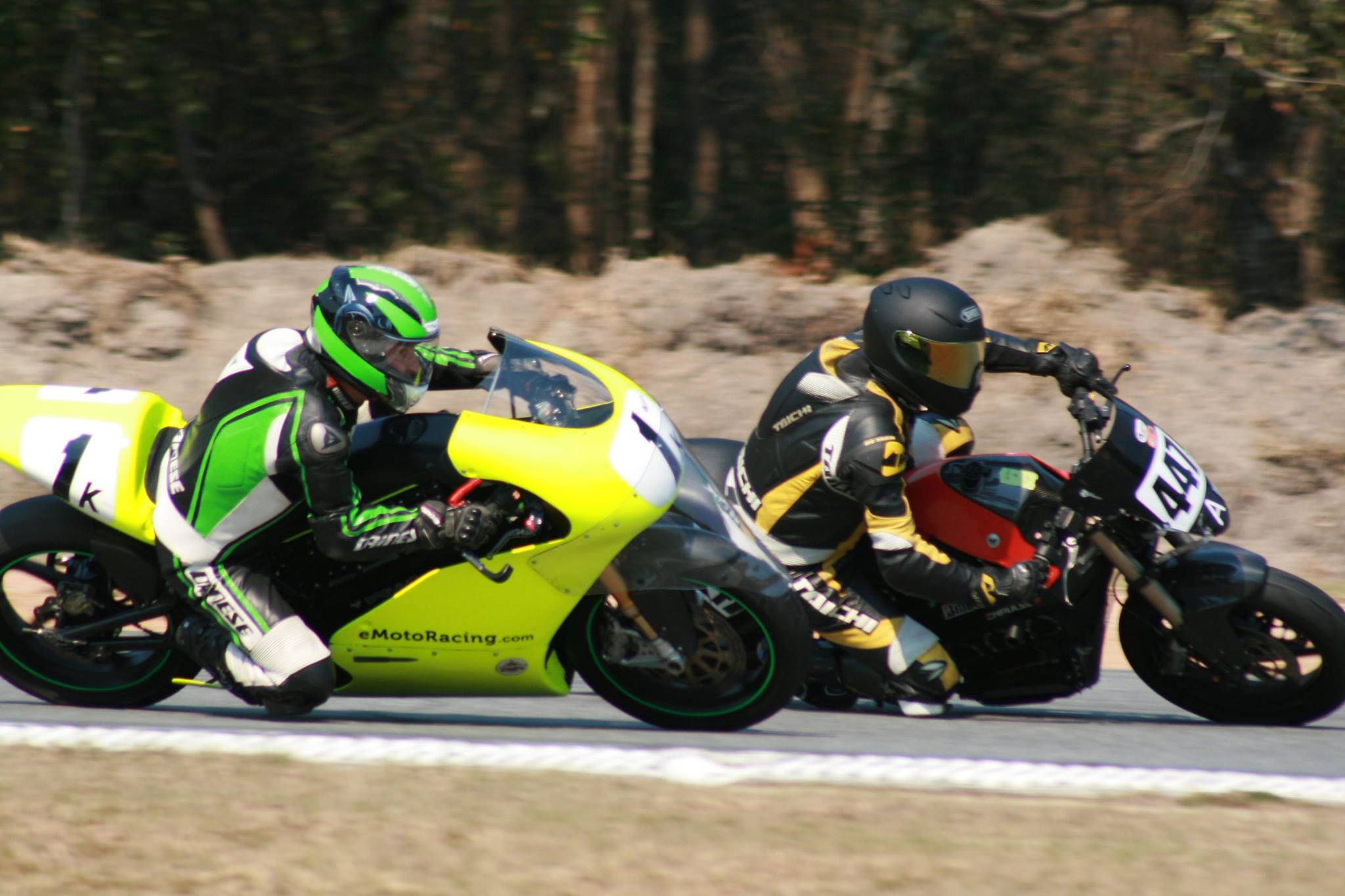
eMotoRacing founder Arthur Kowitz, and Pete Nicolosi, 2016 series points leader (as of race #6), vie for the lead during 2016's 1st race, held at Roebling Road, Georgia, US.

==== eMotoRacing ====
After the TTXGP concluded its 2013 race season, it pulled out of the US, and Arthur Kowitz, who had participated in the FIM eRoad Racing World Cup founded eMotoRacing to fill the void. eMotoRacing kicked off its first season in 2014, running in conjunction with AHRMA which gave access to ten high-profile tracks around the US. In addition to its regular race season, eMotoRacing held its first annual "Varsity Challenge" on July 11–13, 2014, at the New Jersey Motorsports Park, urging engineering teams from universities to race custom-built electric motorcycles. At the start of its third season in 2016, AHRMA announced it had adopted eMotoRacing's "eSuperSport" class as a permanent addition to their roadracing lineup.

=== FIM E-Xplorer World Cup ===
In July 2021 the FIM announced a new electric off-road series, the FIM E-Xplorer World Cup. The series was backed by Alejandro Agag who was involved in Extreme E, Formula E and the E1 Series. Teams of two riders, one make and one female, compete against each other in the series.

The inaugural 2023 season had rounds in Catalonia, Spain, Crans-Montana in the Swiss Alps, the French region of Auvergne and a double header in the sand dunes of Sardinia. The Sardinia rounds were held in conjunction with the Extreme E series. Team MIE (Sandra Gomez and Jorge Zaragoza) won the series.

== See also ==
- Electric kick scooter
- Electric rickshaw
- Electric trike
- Electric vehicle conversion
- Energy density
- Government incentives for plug-in electric vehicles
- List of fastest production motorcycles by acceleration
- List of battery electric motorcycles and scooters
- Miles per gallon gasoline equivalent
- Mobility scooter
- Plug-in electric vehicle
- Scooter-sharing system
