= Leon Camier =

British motorcycle racer (born 1986)

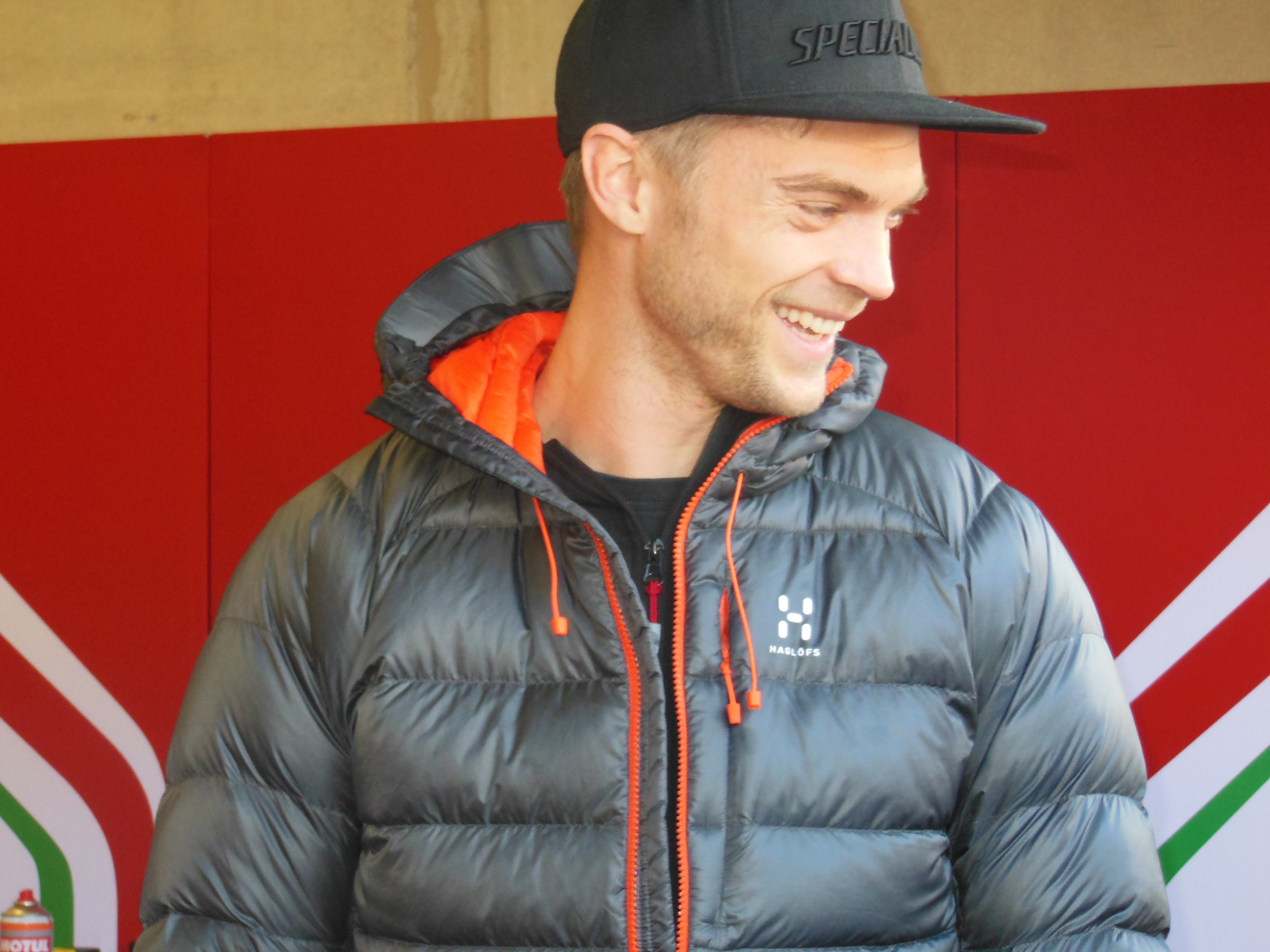
- Camier at Assen in 2016
- Nationality: British
- Born: 4 August 1986 (age 40); Ashford, Kent, England
- Current team: Team HRC Superbike
Motorcycle racing career statistics
MotoGP World Championship
Active years	2014
Manufacturers	Honda
Championships	0
2014 championship position	27th (1 pt)
Starts / Wins / Podiums / Poles / F. laps / Points; 4 / 0 / 0 / 0 / 0 / 1
125cc World Championship
Active years	2002–2003
Manufacturers	Italjet, Honda
Championships	0
2003 championship position	NC (0 pts)
Starts / Wins / Podiums / Poles / F. laps / Points; 12 / 0 / 0 / 0 / 0 / 0
Superbike World Championship
Active years	2009–2020
Manufacturers	Yamaha, Aprilia, Suzuki, BMW, MV Agusta, Honda
Championships	0
2020 championship position	NC (0 pts)
Starts / Wins / Podiums / Poles / F. laps / Points; 223 / 0 / 9 / 0 / 1 / 1272.5
Supersport World Championship
Active years	2006
Manufacturers	Honda
Championships	0
2006 championship position	32nd (6 pts)
Starts / Wins / Podiums / Poles / F. laps / Points; 1 / 0 / 0 / 0 / 0 / 6
British Superbike Championship
Active years	2007–2009
Manufacturers	Honda, Ducati, Yamaha
Championships	1
2009 championship position	1st (549.5 pts)
Starts / Wins / Podiums / Poles / F. laps / Points; 70 / 22 / 33 / 9 / 20 / 1054.5
British Supersport Championship
Active years	2004–2006
Manufacturers	Honda
Championships	1
2006 championship position	4th (112 pts)
Starts / Wins / Podiums / Poles / F. laps / Points; 37 / 4 / 13 / 0 / 0 / 413

Leon Stuart Camier (born 4 August 1986) is an English former solo motorcycle racer.

After working as a race team manager, Camier became a rider-coach for Sam Lowes and Elf Marc VDS Racing. The team competes in Moto2 and entered the Superbike World Championship using a Ducati Panigale 955.

For the 2021 season, Camier was announced as team manager for Honda World Superbike team, run under Honda Racing Corporation. After a long career in solo motorcycle racing he struggled with injuries and finally decided to end his competitive riding.

After difficult 2018 and 2019 seasons with Honda satellite team Moriwaki Althea and suffering from injuries, Camier was contracted to ride for Barni Ducati in WSBK in 2020, but continued to have shoulder injury problems and was unable to start the season and parted ways with Barni Ducati.

== Career ==
=== Early career ===
After beginning Grasstrack racing at the age of six and winning five British championships, Camier became British Junior 80 cc Road Racing champion in 1998. He won the British 125 cc title in 2001 and the British Supersport crown in 2005. This period built a working relationship with Honda which included contesting the 2005 Suzuka 8 Hours race in 2005 at the age of 18 (unusually young for a non-Japanese rider).

Camier was the 2005 British Supersport and 2009 British Superbike Champion. 2010 was his first full season in the World Superbike series.

=== British Superbike Championship (2007–2009) ===
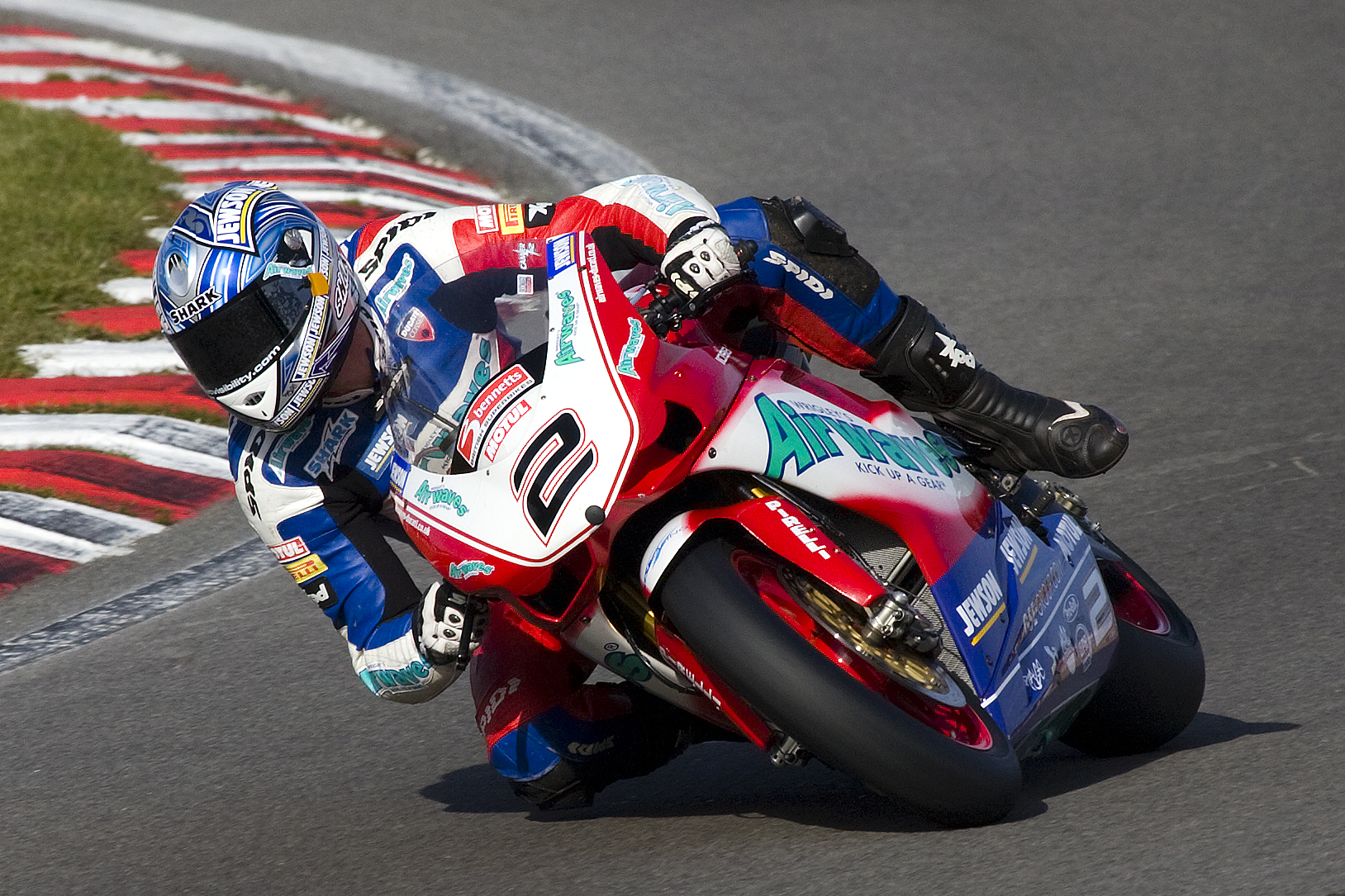
Leon Camier races at Brands Hatch in 2008

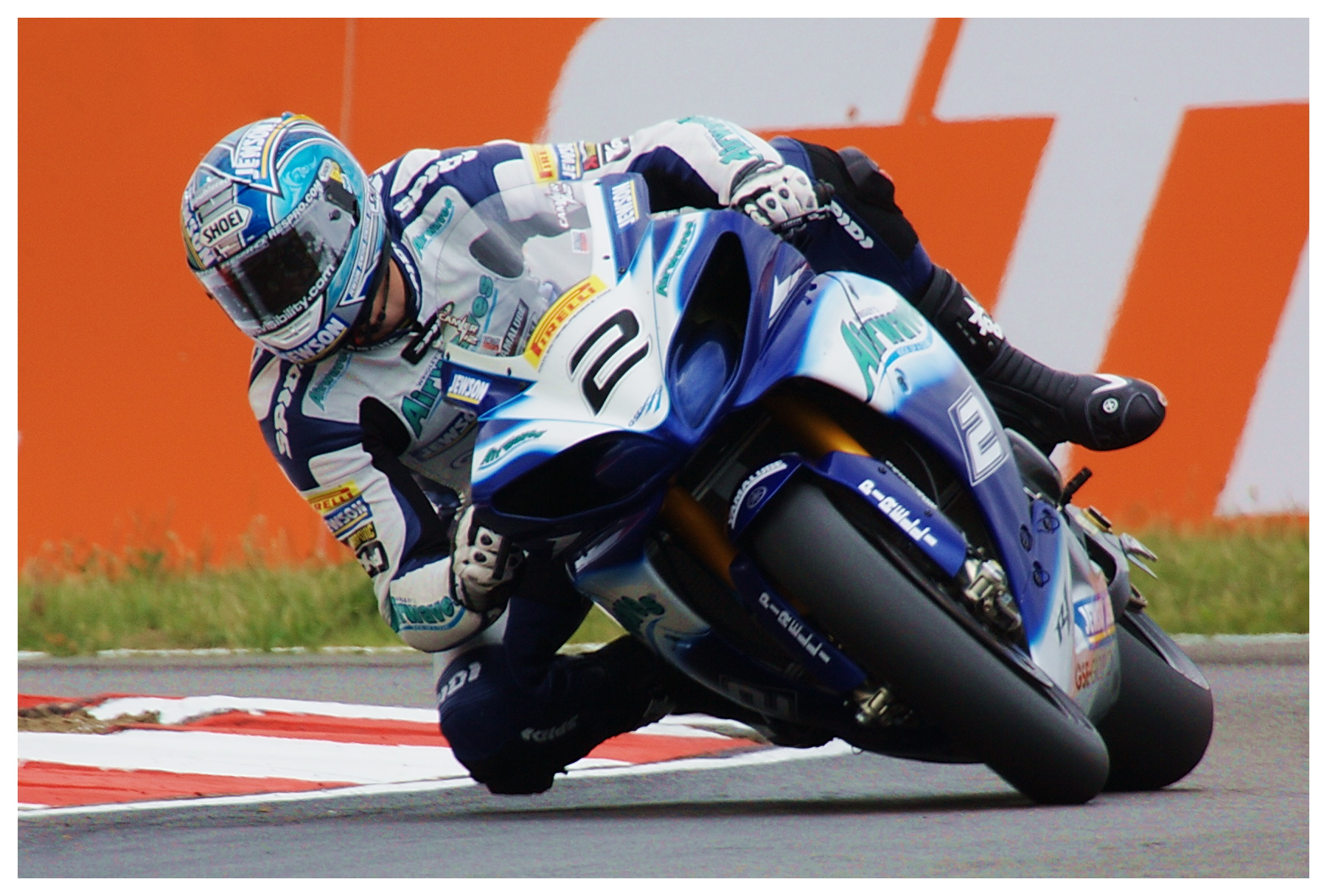
Camier riding his Airwaves Yamaha during the 2009 BSB championship at Snetterton

2007 was Camier's first season in the British Superbike Championship on a Bike Animal Honda. He led the first corners of his very first race and was on the podium in the first three races. A crash in race 6 at Silverstone and two eighth places at Oulton Park damaged his momentum however. At Snetterton, a bike failure in qualifying saw him start 29th but he moved up to sixth in both races amidst Honda dominance. His season ended with a large crash at Cadwell Park causing a broken left femur and right pelvis.

For 2008, Camier joined the GSE Racing Airwaves Ducati team alongside former champion Shane 'Shaky' Byrne. He finished fifth overall, taking his first three wins.

For 2009, GSE switched to Yamahas and James Ellison joined as him teammate. Camier quickly dominated the series, winning even more races than Byrne had in 2008. He won the title with four races to go by overtaking closest rival Ellison on the penultimate lap of race 1 at Silverstone. Immediately on returning to the pits he was greeted by Niall Mackenzie (the last man to win the BSB title on a Yamaha) dressed in his original 1998 Rob Mac Cadbury's Boost leathers. Camier ultimately won a record-breaking 18 races despite only leading out of the first corner twice. His success led to the organisers of the series to adopt the "Showdown Rule" for 2010. This revised the points system to the split-season format popularly used by saloon-car series in the United States.

=== Superbike World Championship (2009–2020) ===
After winning the title, Camier was invited to join the Aprilia squad in the Superbike World Championship for the final two races of the season, replacing the injured Shinya Nakano. His first meeting at Magny-Cours saw him qualify 16th improving to set the fourth fastest warm-up time. Unfortunately, two technical problems meant he took no points. However, in the last meeting of the season at Portimao, Camier finished sixth and seventh.

Camier raced full-time with Aprilia in World Superbike in 2010. He finished second to teammate Max Biaggi in race two at Miller Motorsport Park, giving Aprilia their first 1–2 in the series. At his home round at Silverstone, Camier started 16th but fought back to finish sixth and third in the two races.

In late 2017, Camier signed to compete in the 2018 Superbike World Championship series aboard a Honda Fireblade SP2 for Ten Kate Racing as teammate to Jake Gagne. Camier continued with Honda into 2019, for the first time a full factory-backed team, with teammate Ryuichi Kiyonari.

For the 2020 season, Camier was contracted to ride for Barni Ducati, but continuing shoulder injury problems prevented a start the season and he parted ways with Barni.

Previously, Camier competed since 2015 for MV Agusta Reparto Corse in World Superbikes aboard an MV Agusta F4.

== Career statistics ==
=== All-time statistics ===
Series	Years active	Races	Poles	Podiums	**Wins**	**2nd place**	**3rd place**	Fastest laps	Titles
British Supersport Championship	^{2004–2006}	37	0	13	4	5	4	0	1
Supersport World Championship	^{2006}	1	0	0	0	0	0	0	0
British Superbike Championship	^{2007–2009}	70	9	33	22	6	5	20	1
Superbike World Championship	^{2009−}	162	0	9	0	2	7	1	0
Total		270	9	55	26	13	16	21	2

=== British Supersport Championship ===
==== Races by year ====
(key)

Year	Class	Bike	SIL (England)	BHI (England)	SNE (England)	OUL (England)	MON (Republic of Ireland)	SNE (England)	BHGP (England)	KNO (Scotland)	MAL (England)	CRO (England)	CAD (England)	OUL (England)	DON (England)	Pos	Pts	Ref
2004	BSS	Honda	5	Ret	Ret	6	8	2	Ret		3	2	Ret	4	15	7th	99	

Year	Class	Bike	BHI (England)	THR (England)	MAL (England)	OUL (England)	MON (Republic of Ireland)	CRO (England)	KNO (Scotland)	SNE (England)	SIL (England)	CAD (England)	OUL (England)	DON (England)	BHGP (England)	Pos	Pts	Ref
2005	BSS	Honda	4	1	1	Ret	Ret	2	1	1	4	3	2	7	5	1st	202	

Year	Class	Bike	BHI (England)	DON (England)	THR (England)	OUL (England)	MON (Republic of Ireland)	MAL (England)	SNE (England)	KNO (Scotland)	OUL (England)	CRO (England)	CAD (England)	SIL (England)	BHGP (England)	Pos	Pts	Ref
2006	BSS	Honda	5	Ret	4	Ret		2	6	Ret	3	3	4	Ret	4	4th	112	

=== British Superbike Championship ===
==== Races by year ====
(key) (Races in bold indicate pole position, races in italics indicate fastest lap)

Year	Class	Bike	BHGP (England)		THR (England)		SIL (England)		OUL (England)		SNE (England)		MOP (Republic of Ireland)		KNO (Scotland)		OUL (England)		MAL (England)		CRO (England)		CAD (England)		DON (England)		BHI (England)		Pos	Pts	Ref
Year	Class	Bike	R1	R2	R1	R2	R1	R2	R1	R2	R1	R2	R1	R2	R1	R2	R1	R2	R1	R2	R1	R2	R1	R2	R1	R2	R1	R2	Pos	Pts	Ref
2007	BSB	Honda	2	3	2	5	4	Ret	8	8	5	6	7	6	Ret	7	6	5	8	11	7	5	Ret	Ret					8th	199	

Year	Class	Bike	THR (England)		OUL (England)		BHGP (England)		DON (England)		SNE (England)		MAL (England)		OUL (England)		KNO (Scotland)		CAD (England)		CRO (England)		SIL (England)		BHI (England)		Pos	Pts	Ref
Year	Class	Bike	R1	R2	R1	R2	R1	R2	R1	R2	R1	R2	R1	R2	R1	R2	R1	R2	R1	R2	R1	R2	R1	R2	R1	R2	Pos	Pts	Ref
2008	BSB	Ducati	5	4	3	3	5	3	5	4	1	2	Ret	8	DNS	DNS	5	8	4	4	1	5	1	4	5	3	5th	306	

Year	Class	Bike	BHI (England)		OUL (England)		DON (England)		THR (England)		SNE (England)		KNO (Scotland)		MAL (England)		BHGP (England)			CAD (England)		CRO (England)		SIL (England)		OUL (England)			Pos	Pts	Ref
Year	Class	Bike	R1	R2	R1	R2	R1	R2	R1	R2	R1	R2	R1	R2	R1	R2	R1	R2	R3	R1	R2	R1	R2	R1	R2	R1	R2	R3	Pos	Pts	Ref
2009	BSB	Yamaha	4	1	**1**	**1**	**1**	**12**	**1**	**1**	**1**	**1**	1	1	**2**	**1**	**1**	**1**	**1**	**1**	**DSQ**	**6**	**1**	**1**	**2**	2	1	1	1st	549.5	

=== Supersport World Championship ===
==== Races by year ====
(key) (Races in bold indicate pole position, races in italics indicate fastest lap)

Year	Bike	1	2	3	4	5	6	7	8	9	10	11	12	Pos	Pts
2006	Honda	QAT	AUS	SPA	ITA	EUR	SMR	CZE	GBR; 10	NED	GER	ITA	FRA	32nd	6

=== Superbike World Championship ===
==== Races by year ====
(key) (Races in bold indicate pole position, races in italics indicate fastest lap)

Year	Bike	1		2		3		4		5		6		7		8		9		10		11		12		13		14		Pos	Pts
Year	Bike	R1	R2	R1	R2	R1	R2	R1	R2	R1	R2	R1	R2	R1	R2	R1	R2	R1	R2	R1	R2	R1	R2	R1	R2	R1	R2	R1	R2	Pos	Pts
2009	Yamaha	AUS	AUS	QAT	QAT	SPA	SPA	NED	NED	ITA	ITA	RSA	RSA	USA	USA	SMR	SMR	GBR; 13	GBR; 6											20th	32
2009	Aprilia																			CZE	CZE	GER	GER	ITA	ITA	FRA; Ret	FRA; Ret	POR; 6	POR; 7	20th	32
2010	Aprilia	AUS; 11	AUS; 11	POR; 5	POR; 5	SPA; Ret	SPA; Ret	NED; 3	NED; Ret	ITA; 5	ITA; 4	RSA; 6	RSA; Ret	USA; 4	USA; 2	SMR; 6	SMR; 11	CZE; Ret	CZE; 8	GBR; 6	GBR; 3	GER; DNS	GER; DNS	ITA	ITA	FRA	FRA			12th	164
2011	Aprilia	AUS; 13	AUS; 6	EUR; 8	EUR; 3	NED; Ret	NED; 4	ITA; 8	ITA; Ret	USA; 4	USA; 2	SMR; 6	SMR; Ret	SPA; 3	SPA; 8	CZE; 7	CZE; Ret	GBR; 15	GBR; 5	GER; 8	GER; Ret	ITA; 15	ITA; 3	FRA; 4	FRA; 6	POR; 12	POR; 6			7th	208
2012	Suzuki	AUS; 17	AUS; 12	ITA; Ret	ITA; 8	NED; Ret	NED; 14	ITA; C	ITA; 15	EUR; 9	EUR; 4	USA; 13	USA; 11	SMR; 10	SMR; 15	SPA; 9	SPA; Ret	CZE; 14	CZE; 9	GBR; Ret	GBR; Ret	RUS; 15	RUS; 5	GER; 5	GER; 3	POR; 11	POR; Ret	FRA; Ret	FRA; 10	14th	115.5
2013	Suzuki	AUS; 9	AUS; 9	SPA; DNS	SPA; DNS	NED; 9	NED; 7	ITA; 9	ITA; 7	GBR; Ret	GBR; 13	POR; 4	POR; Ret	ITA; 7	ITA; 7	RUS; 9	RUS; C	GBR; 3	GBR; 5	GER; Ret	GER; DNS	TUR; DNS	TUR; DNS	USA	USA	FRA	FRA	SPA; 8	SPA; 6	11th	132
2014	BMW	AUS	AUS	SPA; 12	SPA; 12	NED; 13	NED; Ret	ITA; 11	ITA; 12	GBR; DNS	GBR; DNS	MAL; 10	MAL; 12	ITA	ITA	POR	POR													16th	37
2014	MV Agusta																	USA; 15	USA; 10	SPA	SPA	FRA	FRA	QAT	QAT					16th	37
2015	MV Agusta	AUS; 10	AUS; 8	THA; Ret	THA; Ret	SPA; 10	SPA; 15	NED; 10	NED; 10	ITA; Ret	ITA; Ret	GBR; 9	GBR; Ret	POR; Ret	POR; Ret	ITA; 13	ITA; 16	USA; 10	USA; 10	MAL; 13	MAL; 12	SPA; 9	SPA; 8	FRA; 5	FRA; 15	QAT; Ret	QAT; Ret			13th	89
2016	MV Agusta	AUS; 7	AUS; Ret	THA; 11	THA; 11	SPA; Ret	SPA; 16	NED; 4	NED; 9	ITA; 6	ITA; 5	MAL; 10	MAL; 9	GBR; 4	GBR; 5	ITA; 8	ITA; Ret	USA; 11	USA; DNS	GER; 5	GER; 4	FRA; 7	FRA; 4	SPA; 7	SPA; Ret	QAT; 18	QAT; 13			8th	168
2017	MV Agusta	AUS; 5	AUS; 8	THA; 8	THA; Ret	SPA; 11	SPA; 10	NED; 10	NED; 6	ITA; 6	ITA; Ret	GBR; 6	GBR; 6	ITA; 11	ITA; Ret	USA; 6	USA; Ret	GER; 5	GER; 6	POR; 4	POR; Ret	FRA; 4	FRA; Ret	SPA; 12	SPA; 12	QAT; 9	QAT; 9			8th	168
2018	Honda	AUS; 7	AUS; 6	THA; 4	THA; 6	SPA; Ret	SPA; DNS	NED	NED	ITA; WD	ITA; WD	GBR; 10	GBR; 8	CZE; 9	CZE; 7	USA; Ret	USA; 13	ITA; 9	ITA; 10	POR; Ret	POR; 14	FRA; 11	FRA; 9	ARG; 10	ARG; Ret	QAT; Ret	QAT; C			12th	108

Year	Bike	1			2			3			4			5			6			7			8			9			10			11			12			13			Pos	Pts
Year	Bike	R1	SR	R2	R1	SR	R2	R1	SR	R2	R1	SR	R2	R1	SR	R2	R1	SR	R2	R1	SR	R2	R1	SR	R2	R1	SR	R2	R1	SR	R2	R1	SR	R2	R1	SR	R2	R1	SR	R2	Pos	Pts
2019	Kawasaki	AUS; Ret	AUS; 13	AUS; 10	THA; 13	THA; NC	THA; DNS	SPA; 11	SPA; 12	SPA; 13	NED; 11	NED; C	NED; 12	ITA; DNS	ITA; DNS	ITA; C	SPA	SPA	SPA	ITA	ITA	ITA	GBR	GBR	GBR	USA	USA	USA	POR	POR	POR	FRA; 7	FRA; 16	FRA; 9	ARG; DNS	ARG; 12	ARG; 13	QAT; 10	QAT; 13	QAT; 16	17th	51
2020	Ducati	AUS; DNS	AUS; DNS	AUS; DNS	SPA	SPA	SPA	POR	POR	POR	SPA	SPA	SPA	SPA	SPA	SPA	SPA	SPA	SPA	FRA	FRA	FRA	POR	POR	POR																NC	0

=== Grand Prix motorcycle racing ===
==== By season ====
Season	Class	Motorcycle	Team	Race	Win	Podium	Pole	FLap	Pts	Plcd
2002	125cc	Italjet	Italjet Racing Service	3	0	0	0	0	0	NC
2003	125cc	Honda	Metasystem Racing Service	9	0	0	0	0	0	NC
2014	MotoGP	Honda	Drive M7 Aspar	4	0	0	0	0	1	27th
Total				**16**	**0**	**0**	**0**	**0**	**1**	

==== Races by year ====
(key) (Races in bold indicate pole position, races in italics indicate fastest lap)

Year	Class	Bike	1	2	3	4	5	6	7	8	9	10	11	12	13	14	15	16	17	18	Pos	Pts
2002	125cc	Italjet	JPN	RSA	SPA	FRA	ITA	CAT; 24	NED; 28	GBR; 24	GER	CZE	POR	BRA	PAC	MAL	AUS	VAL			NC	0
2003	125cc	Honda	JPN; 26	RSA; Ret	SPA; 30	FRA; 24	ITA; 30	CAT; 27	NED; Ret	GBR; Ret	GER; 23	CZE	POR	BRA	PAC	MAL	AUS	VAL			NC	0
2014	MotoGP	Honda	QAT	AME	ARG	SPA	FRA	ITA	CAT	NED	GER	INP; Ret	CZE; 15	GBR; 16	RSM; 16	ARA	JPN	AUS	MAL	VAL	27th	1
