= Jincheng Group =

Chinese industrial group

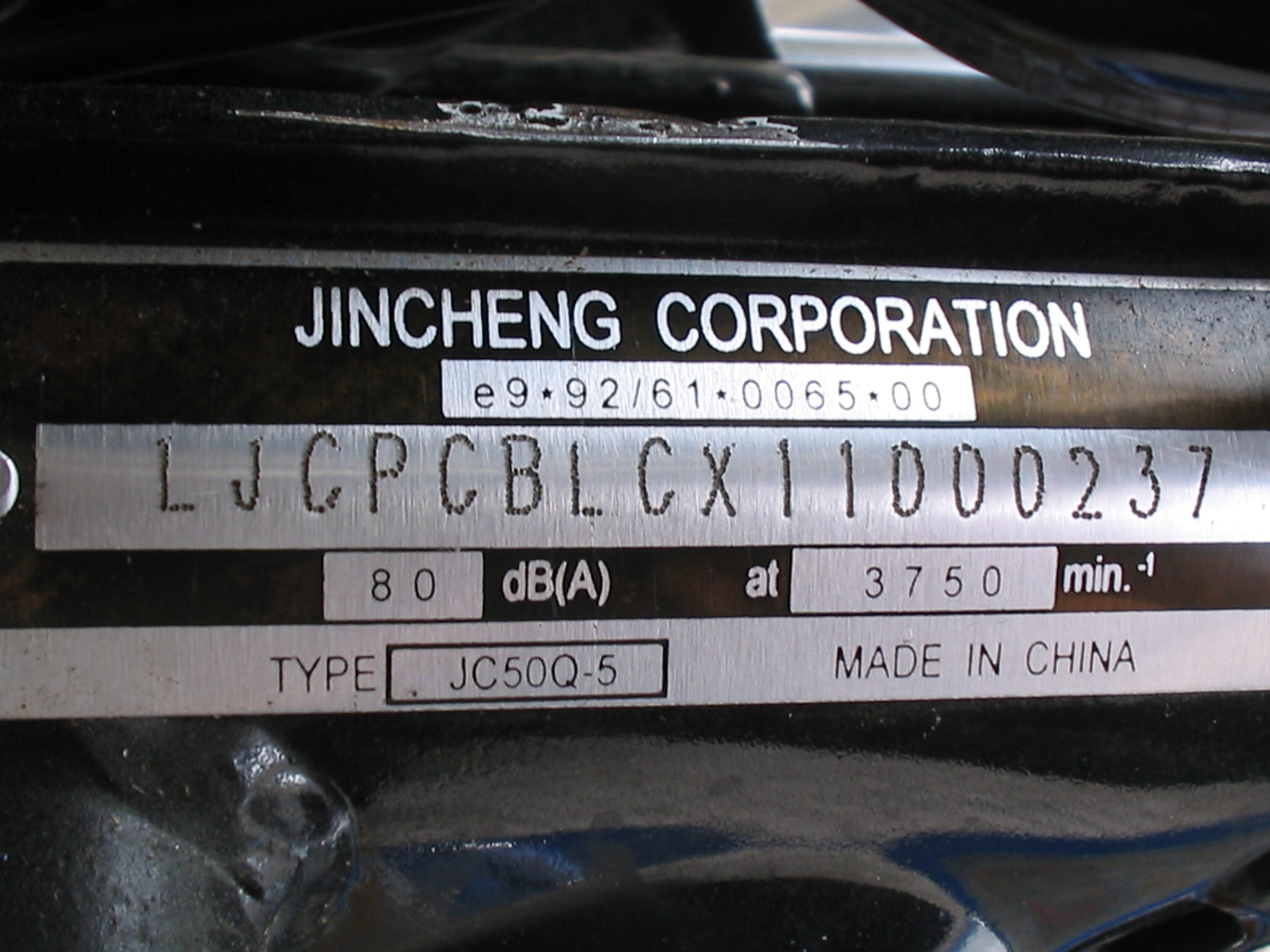
- Native name: Chinese: 金城集团
- Industry: Electromechanic and Hydraulic; Light power; Vehicle; International trade; Service
- Founded: 1949; 77 years ago
- Headquarters: Nanjing, Jiangsu Province, China
- Owner: Government of China

The Jincheng Group (Chinese: 金城集团) was established in 1949 and affiliated with China Aviation Industry Corporation I (AVIC I), Jincheng Corporation is a large state-owned enterprise group engaged in five industries, i.e., electromechanic and hydraulic industry, light power industry, vehicle industry, international trade industry and production & service industry. Jincheng Corporation is a hi-tech enterprise, a model enterprise of CIMS Project of the 863 Program and a national "contract-abiding by and credit-emphasizing:enterprise. The brand "Jincheng", with the value of RMB 3.109 billion Yuan, is "Chinese Famous Trademark". The company is headquartered in Nanjing, Jiangsu Province, China.

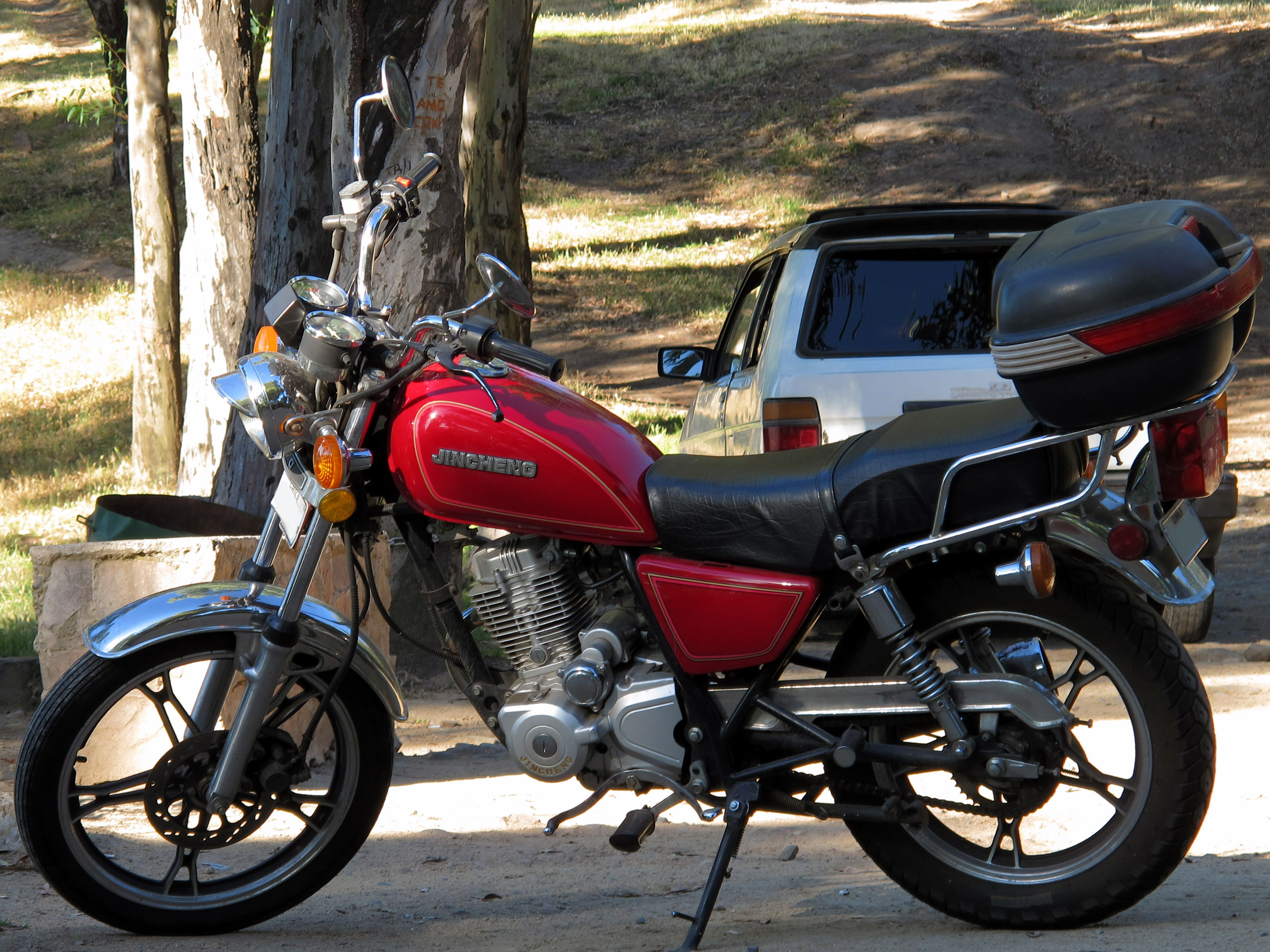
2010 Jincheng JC 150-18 model motorcycle

Jincheng is among the top 500 Chinese large enterprise companies with net assets of US$ 200 million and fixed assets of US$450 million. Motorcycles are a large part of their business, exporting 80 models to almost 40 countries and are ranked top in the Chinese Motorcycle sector. In 2006 Devon Motorcycles, who distribute Jincheng motorcycles in the United States, teamed up with them to make Aprilia motorcycles and engines.

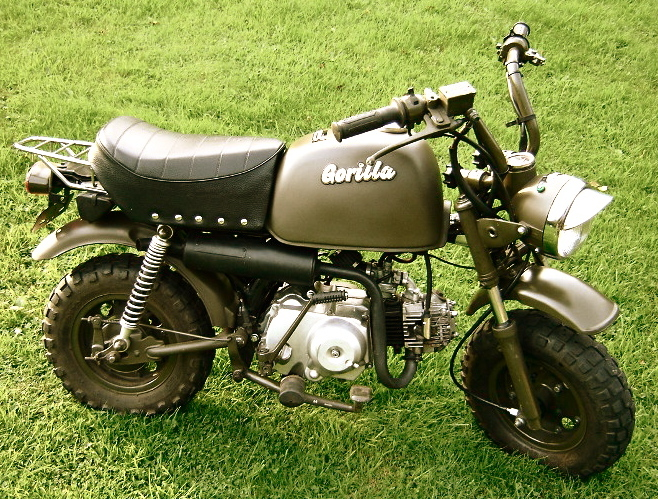
Jincheng Gorilla

It is one of the top three leading motorcycle manufacturers in China. in the past the company had a joint venture with Suzuki, Nanjing Jincheng Suzuki Motorcycle Co., Ltd, and with Aprilia. In 2006, it exported more than half a million motorcycles to 50 countries around the world. It has subsidiaries in Argentina, Columbia, and Nigeria.

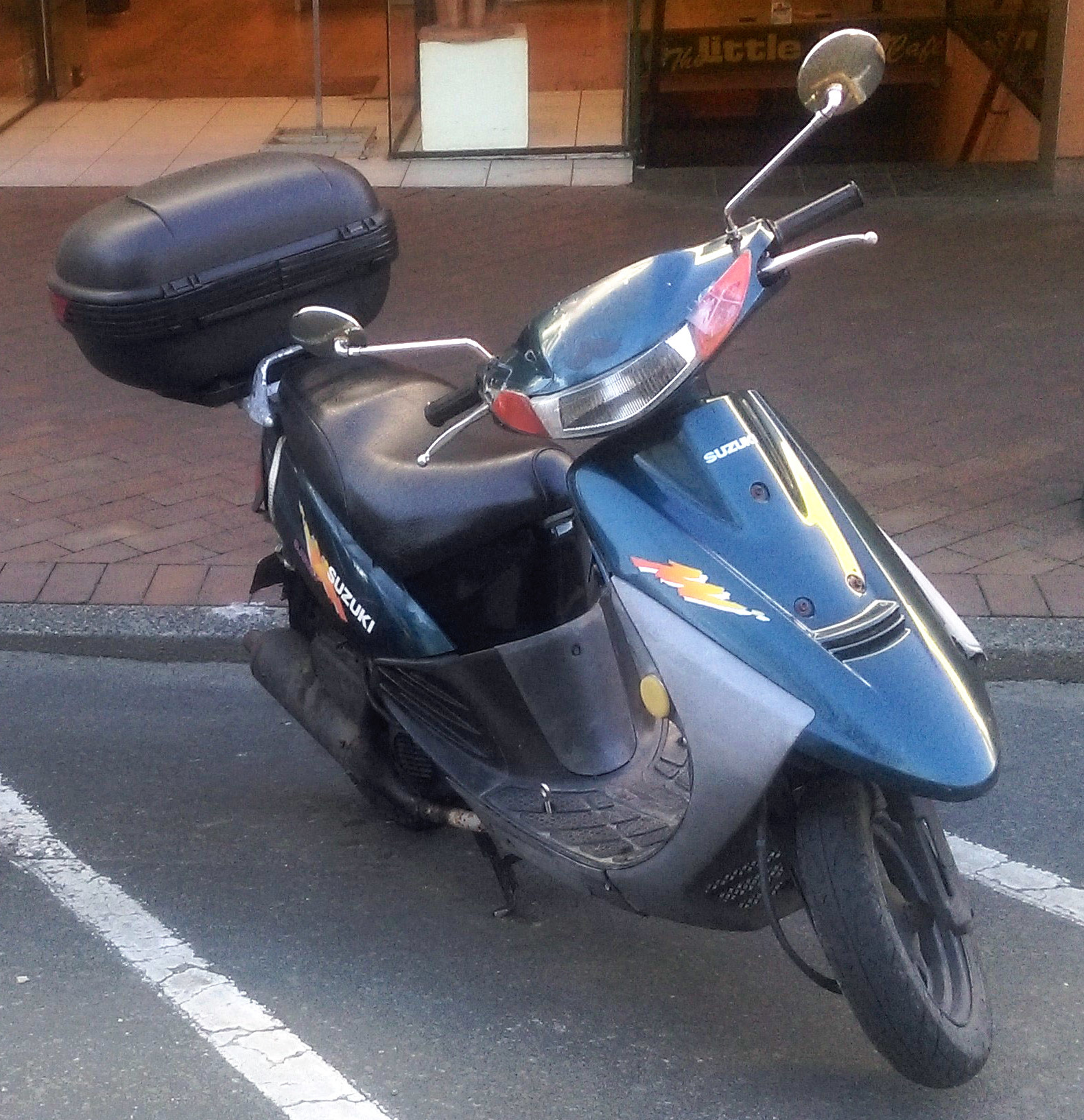
Suzuki SJ50QT made by Jincheng Suzuki

Jincheng Group Imp & Exp Co. Ltd. offers international trading and international cooperation services. It imports and exports motorcycles, machinery, special-purpose vehicles, vehicle accessories, equipment, and other products.

The brand name includes manufacture and distribution of at least 77 vehicles, 59 models, types and all kinds of two and three-wheeled motorized vehicles: cargo trikes, cub bikes, motomotorcycles, scooters, underbone motorcycles, moto three-wheelers tricycle trucks, mopeds, 50cc scooters, and 50cc underbone motorcycles, etc. Notwithstanding the use of the trade name, "Jincheng", the vehicles are manufactured by

- Jincheng Group Co., Ltd. (a company in Nanjing, Jiangsu Province, China); and
- Guangzhou Jincheng Motorcycle Co., Ltd. (a company in Conghua District, Guangzhou, Guangdong Province, China).

In 2024, Jincheng Group was responsible for 1,014 Mt of CO_{2} emissions, which was 2.63% of global CO_{2} emissions.

== History ==
The foundation of Jincheng Group dates back to 1949, when the company entered into an agreement with the Chinese government to establish a Chinese Air Force maintenance facility located in Shanghai. In 1958, the production of components for aircraft equipment also began in the aeronautical maintenance sector.

In the eighties, Jincheng started development projects for the motorcycle sector, looking for a foreign partner for production. In 1985, an agreement was signed with the Japanese Suzuki for the supply of technology and patents for motorcycles. The first model assembled by the Chinese manufacturer is the Suzuki AX 100. From this moment, the company will quickly start developing a series of motorcycles that will be highly appreciated on the local market.

In 1993 it began to export to Pakistan and in 1994 the Nanjing Jincheng Suzuki Motorcycle joint venture was born, based in Nanjing, which allowed the Suzuki brand to officially enter the Chinese market.

Also in 1993, the Sino-foreign joint venture Yiyang Jincheng Motorcycle was established, a partnership between Jincheng and the Hong Kong-based company Qibang Asia Co., Ltd., with the aim of producing and selling "Jinli" brand motorcycles.

In 1995, Jincheng Group obtained the ISO9001 quality certificate.

Subsequently, the company continued its expansion plan, especially in the Asian and South American markets; in 1997, the first assembly plant was founded in Colombia, and subsequently landed in Argentina.

In 1998 Honda bought the production rights of the minibike Honda Monkey which is re-proposed on the market with extensive modifications, renamed Jincheng JC50-Q7, and also imported into Europe. In Italy, it will be distributed by the Motor Union and sold as Doggy. He later launches a copy of the Honda Dax.

In 1999, he began developing a new range of scooters designed for the European market and signed an agreement with Yamaha Motor to produce engines under license in the 125-250 cc range. In 2000, he signed an agreement with the Italian company Italjet to sell its Jincheng Eupolo maxiscooter in Europe under the Italian brand. This model will be imported from 2001 and renamed Italjet Jupiter in 125, 150, and 250 displacements.

In 2002, it obtained the ISO14001 international quality certificate.

At the end of 2003, a strategic agreement was signed with Aprilia to produce scooters and engines under license in China with the Jincheng brand. In 2006, production of the Scarabeo "Light" models began in China under license and, together with the Aprilia research and development center in Noale, a new 125 and 200 cc four-stroke engine was industrialized, which was also mounted on the Scarabeo produced in Italy.

In the mid-2000s, the joint venture with Suzuki ended as the Japanese company created a new joint venture with the Chinese company Haojue.

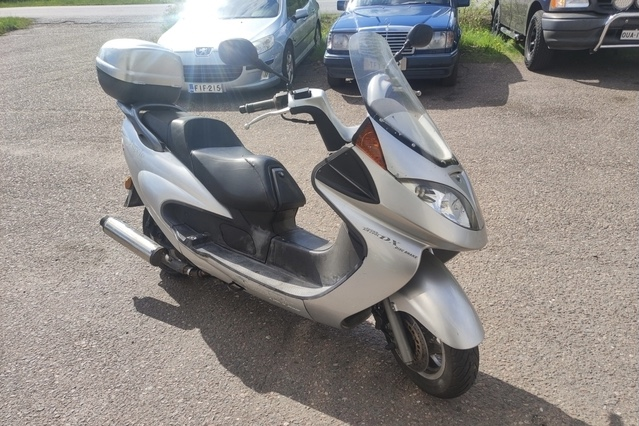
Jincheng Eupolo, sold in Europe by Italjet

The agreement with Aprilia ends when the Piaggio group strengthens its presence in China by signing an agreement with the competitor Zongshen to produce Aprilia motorcycles. As a result, the Jincheng group acquired the production rights for the old Scarabeo and the related 125/200 engines to sell them under its own brand. This is how Jincheng Tiramisù was launched in 2016, the old Scarabeo "Light" with a revised aesthetic design.

Also in 2018, Jincheng entered into a partnership with Adiva to produce motorcycles for the Italian brand to be sold in China. In December 2020, the production of the Adiva AJ/Fortune model started, a high-wheeled scooter derived from the Jincheng Tiramisu, which is sold only in Asia.

Jincheng recently presented new models of both road and adventure motorcycles with displacements from 125 up to 400 cc. It is also a partner of numerous European breakers. It produces components and engines for Italjet used in the new Dragster model, supplies its Jincheng Grasshopper 125/200 scooter to the Austrian KSR Group which resells it in Europe and Asia under the Malaguti brand rebadged Malaguti Mission. Also supplies its Tiramisù 125 scooter to Spanish MH Motorcycle (ex Motorhispania) which sell as a MH Fasty 125.

== See also ==
- Jincheng Suzuki
