= Jincheng Suzuki =

Jincheng Suzuki is a joint Sino-Japanese producer of motorcycles and scooters founded in 1994 and headquartered in Nanjing. It is a joint venture between Suzuki and Nanjing Jincheng Machinery. The company claims output of 3,000 units per month, making it the first-place exporter and foreign-currency earner in the Chinese motorcycle industry.
