= 2003 Italian motorcycle Grand Prix =

Motorsport

(Italy) 2003 Italian Grand Prix
Race details
- Race 5 of 16 races in the 2003 Grand Prix motorcycle racing season
- Date: 8 June 2003
- Official name: Gran Premio Cinzano d'Italia
- Location: Mugello Circuit
- Course: Permanent racing facility; 5.245 km (3.259 mi)

MotoGP
Pole position
Rider	(Italy) Valentino Rossi	Honda
Time	1:51.927	
Fastest lap
Rider	(Italy) Loris Capirossi	Ducati
Time	1:52.623 on lap 20	
Podium
First	(Italy) Valentino Rossi	Honda
Second	(Italy) Loris Capirossi	Ducati
Third	(Italy) Max Biaggi	Honda

250cc
Pole position
Rider	(France) Randy de Puniet	Aprilia
Time	1:53.586	
Fastest lap
Rider	(France) Randy de Puniet	Aprilia
Time	1:54.994 on lap 8	
Podium
First	(San Marino) Manuel Poggiali	Aprilia
Second	(Spain) Fonsi Nieto	Aprilia
Third	(Italy) Franco Battaini	Aprilia

125cc
Pole position
Rider	(Australia) Casey Stoner	Aprilia
Time	1:58.914	
Fastest lap
Rider	(Italy) Gino Borsoi	Aprilia
Time	1:58.969 on lap 5	
Podium
First	(Italy) Lucio Cecchinello	Aprilia
Second	(Spain) Daniel Pedrosa	Honda
Third	(Spain) Pablo Nieto	Aprilia

The 2003 Italian motorcycle Grand Prix was the fifth round of the 2003 MotoGP Championship. It took place on the weekend of 6–8 June 2003 at the Mugello Circuit.

== MotoGP classification ==
Pos.	No.	Rider	Team	Manufacturer	Laps	Time/Retired	Grid	Points
1	46	(Italy) Valentino Rossi	Repsol Honda	Honda	23	43:28.008	1	25
2	65	(Italy) Loris Capirossi	Ducati Marlboro Team	Ducati	23	+1.416	2	20
3	3	(Italy) Max Biaggi	Camel Pramac Pons	Honda	23	+4.576	4	16
4	6	(Japan) Makoto Tamada	Pramac Honda	Honda	23	+13.210	10	13
5	56	(Japan) Shinya Nakano	d'Antín Yamaha Team	Yamaha	23	+13.411	3	11
6	11	(Japan) Tohru Ukawa	Camel Pramac Pons	Honda	23	+13.666	5	10
7	15	(Spain) Sete Gibernau	Telefónica Movistar Honda	Honda	23	+14.253	6	9
8	7	(Spain) Carlos Checa	Fortuna Yamaha Team	Yamaha	23	+22.811	7	8
9	45	(United States) Colin Edwards	Alice Aprilia Racing	Aprilia	23	+33.056	13	7
10	19	(France) Olivier Jacque	Gauloises Yamaha Team	Yamaha	23	+38.882	8	6
11	33	(Italy) Marco Melandri	Fortuna Yamaha Team	Yamaha	23	+38.977	12	5
12	69	(United States) Nicky Hayden	Repsol Honda	Honda	23	+48.639	17	4
13	23	(Japan) Ryuichi Kiyonari	Telefónica Movistar Honda	Honda	23	+50.183	22	3
14	66	(Germany) Alex Hofmann	Kawasaki Racing Team	Kawasaki	23	+54.213	15	2
15	8	(Australia) Garry McCoy	Kawasaki Racing Team	Kawasaki	23	+1:23.281	20	1
16	88	(Australia) Andrew Pitt	Kawasaki Racing Team	Kawasaki	23	+1:37.284	21	
Ret	99	(United Kingdom) Jeremy McWilliams	Proton Team KR	Proton KR	18	Retirement	19	
Ret	9	(Japan) Nobuatsu Aoki	Proton Team KR	Proton KR	14	Retirement	23	
Ret	12	(Australia) Troy Bayliss	Ducati Marlboro Team	Ducati	10	Accident	11	
Ret	41	(Japan) Noriyuki Haga	Alice Aprilia Racing	Aprilia	7	Accident	16	
Ret	4	(Brazil) Alex Barros	Gauloises Yamaha Team	Yamaha	2	Accident	9	
Ret	21	(United States) John Hopkins	Suzuki Grand Prix Team	Suzuki	2	Accident	14	
Ret	10	(United States) Kenny Roberts Jr.	Suzuki Grand Prix Team	Suzuki	2	Accident	18	

== 250 cc classification ==
Pos.	No.	Rider	Manufacturer	Laps	Time/Retired	Grid	Points
1	54	(San Marino) Manuel Poggiali	Aprilia	20	38:40.038	2	25
2	10	(Spain) Fonsi Nieto	Aprilia	20	+22.445	3	20
3	21	(Italy) Franco Battaini	Aprilia	20	+23.446	4	16
4	3	(Italy) Roberto Rolfo	Honda	20	+24.432	6	13
5	50	(France) Sylvain Guintoli	Aprilia	20	+31.679	8	11
6	24	(Spain) Toni Elías	Aprilia	20	+39.837	5	10
7	8	(Japan) Naoki Matsudo	Yamaha	20	+44.832	9	9
8	5	(Argentina) Sebastián Porto	Honda	20	+44.905	7	8
9	14	(Australia) Anthony West	Aprilia	20	+1:02.385	13	7
10	11	(Spain) Joan Olivé	Aprilia	20	+1:06.020	12	6
11	9	(France) Hugo Marchand	Aprilia	20	+1:11.197	16	5
12	6	(Spain) Alex Debón	Honda	20	+1:11.257	15	4
13	57	(United Kingdom) Chaz Davies	Aprilia	20	+1:17.964	17	3
14	96	(Czech Republic) Jakub Smrž	Honda	20	+1:21.573	21	2
15	33	(Spain) Héctor Faubel	Aprilia	20	+1:25.294	14	1
16	15	(Germany) Christian Gemmel	Honda	20	+1:26.780	18	
17	36	(France) Erwan Nigon	Aprilia	20	+1:35.206	10	
18	18	(Netherlands) Henk vd Lagemaat	Honda	19	+1 lap	22	
19	29	(Italy) Christian Pistoni	Aprilia	19	+1 lap	23	
Ret	7	(France) Randy de Puniet	Aprilia	16	Accident	1	
Ret	26	(Italy) Alex Baldolini	Aprilia	10	Accident	20	
Ret	16	(Sweden) Johan Stigefelt	Aprilia	0	Retirement	11	
DNS	34	(France) Eric Bataille	Honda	0	Did not start	19	
DNS	13	(Czech Republic) Jaroslav Huleš	Yamaha		Did not start		
DNQ	98	(Germany) Katja Poensgen	Honda		Did not qualify		

== 125 cc classification ==
Pos.	No.	Rider	Manufacturer	Laps	Time/Retired	Grid	Points
1	4	(Italy) Lucio Cecchinello	Aprilia	20	40:01.738	6	25
2	3	(Spain) Daniel Pedrosa	Honda	20	+0.730	10	20
3	22	(Spain) Pablo Nieto	Aprilia	20	+0.801	4	16
4	34	(Italy) Andrea Dovizioso	Honda	20	+0.810	7	13
5	15	(San Marino) Alex de Angelis	Aprilia	20	+1.454	3	11
6	41	(Japan) Youichi Ui	Aprilia	20	+7.656	8	10
7	7	(Italy) Stefano Perugini	Aprilia	20	+7.702	2	9
8	23	(Italy) Gino Borsoi	Aprilia	20	+7.708	9	8
9	80	(Spain) Héctor Barberá	Aprilia	20	+21.704	12	7
10	42	(Italy) Gioele Pellino	Aprilia	20	+22.132	13	6
11	6	(Italy) Mirko Giansanti	Aprilia	20	+22.208	16	5
12	24	(Italy) Simone Corsi	Honda	20	+34.326	17	4
13	36	(Finland) Mika Kallio	Honda	20	+34.434	24	3
14	8	(Japan) Masao Azuma	Honda	20	+34.493	22	2
15	12	(Switzerland) Thomas Lüthi	Honda	20	+34.879	21	1
16	79	(Hungary) Gábor Talmácsi	Aprilia	20	+35.035	14	
17	58	(Italy) Marco Simoncelli	Aprilia	20	+45.352	15	
18	27	(Australia) Casey Stoner	Aprilia	20	+46.072	1	
19	50	(Italy) Andrea Ballerini	Gilera	20	+46.428	27	
20	10	(Italy) Roberto Locatelli	KTM	20	+46.436	20	
21	1	(France) Arnaud Vincent	KTM	20	+46.615	11	
22	87	(Italy) Michele Conti	Honda	20	+52.953	26	
23	11	(Italy) Max Sabbatani	Aprilia	20	+53.338	19	
24	60	(Italy) Mattia Angeloni	Honda	20	+1:04.110	28	
25	88	(Denmark) Robbin Harms	Aprilia	20	+1:04.186	31	
26	62	(Italy) Alessio Aldrovandi	Malaguti	20	+1:11.059	29	
27	25	(Hungary) Imre Tóth	Honda	20	+1:16.722	25	
28	19	(Spain) Álvaro Bautista	Aprilia	20	+1:16.830	35	
29	61	(Italy) Michele Pirro	Aprilia	20	+1:22.815	33	
30	21	(United Kingdom) Leon Camier	Honda	19	+1 lap	37	
31	78	(Hungary) Péter Lénárt	Honda	19	+1 lap	38	
Ret	17	(Germany) Steve Jenkner	Aprilia	19	Accident	5	
Ret	48	(Spain) Jorge Lorenzo	Derbi	19	Retirement	18	
Ret	32	(Italy) Fabrizio Lai	Malaguti	11	Retirement	32	
Ret	31	(Spain) Julián Simón	Malaguti	10	Retirement	34	
Ret	26	(Spain) Emilio Alzamora	Derbi	9	Retirement	23	
Ret	14	(United Kingdom) Chris Martin	Aprilia	7	Retirement	36	
Ret	63	(France) Mike Di Meglio	Aprilia	0	Retirement	30	

== Championship standings after the race (MotoGP) ==
Below are the standings for the top five riders and constructors after round five has concluded.

Riders' Championship standings

Pos.	Rider	Points
1	(Italy) Valentino Rossi	115
2	(Italy) Max Biaggi	83
3	(Spain) Sete Gibernau	72
4	(Brazil) Alex Barros	46
5	(Japan) Tohru Ukawa	42

Constructors' Championship standings

Pos.	Constructor	Points
1	(Japan) Honda	125
2	(Italy) Ducati	65
3	(Japan) Yamaha	57
4	(Italy) Aprilia	30
5	(Malaysia) / (United States) Proton KR	21

- Note: Only the top five positions are included for both sets of standings.

Previous race: 2003 French Grand Prix	FIM Grand Prix World Championship; 2003 season	Next race: 2003 Catalan Grand Prix
Previous race: 2002 Italian Grand Prix	Italian motorcycle Grand Prix	Next race: 2004 Italian Grand Prix
