= 2002 Italian motorcycle Grand Prix =

(Italy) 2002 Italian Grand Prix
Race details
- Race 5 of 16 races in the 2002 Grand Prix motorcycle racing season
- Date: 2 June 2002
- Official name: Gran Premio Cinzano d'Italia
- Location: Mugello Circuit
- Course: Permanent racing facility; 5.245 km (3.259 mi)

MotoGP
Pole position
Rider	(Italy) Valentino Rossi	Honda
Time	1:51.258	
Fastest lap
Rider	(Japan) Tohru Ukawa	Honda
Time	1:52.601 on lap 2	
Podium
First	(Italy) Valentino Rossi	Honda
Second	(Italy) Max Biaggi	Yamaha
Third	(Japan) Tohru Ukawa	Honda

250cc
Pole position
Rider	(Italy) Franco Battaini	Aprilia
Time	1:54.344	
Fastest lap
Rider	(Spain) Fonsi Nieto	Aprilia
Time	1:54.812 on lap 21	
Podium
First	(Italy) Marco Melandri	Aprilia
Second	(Italy) Roberto Locatelli	Aprilia
Third	(Spain) Fonsi Nieto	Aprilia

125cc
Pole position
Rider	(San Marino) Manuel Poggiali	Gilera
Time	1:59.369	
Fastest lap
Rider	(Italy) Lucio Cecchinello	Aprilia
Time	1:59.184 on lap 4	
Podium
First	(San Marino) Manuel Poggiali	Gilera
Second	(Japan) Youichi Ui	Derbi
Third	(Spain) Pablo Nieto	Aprilia

The 2002 Italian motorcycle Grand Prix was the fifth round of the 2002 MotoGP Championship. It took place on the weekend of 31 May – 2 June 2002 at the Mugello Circuit.

== MotoGP classification ==
Pos.	No.	Rider	Team	Manufacturer	Laps	Time/Retired	Grid	Points
1	46	(Italy) Valentino Rossi	Repsol Honda Team	Honda	23	43:40.837	1	25
2	3	(Italy) Max Biaggi	Marlboro Yamaha Team	Yamaha	23	+2.404	2	20
3	11	(Japan) Tohru Ukawa	Repsol Honda Team	Honda	23	+11.289	7	16
4	7	(Spain) Carlos Checa	Marlboro Yamaha Team	Yamaha	23	+11.408	3	13
5	4	(Brazil) Alex Barros	West Honda Pons	Honda	23	+15.371	9	11
6	65	(Italy) Loris Capirossi	West Honda Pons	Honda	23	+20.010	4	10
7	6	(Japan) Norifumi Abe	Antena 3 Yamaha d'Antín	Yamaha	23	+26.447	19	9
8	55	(France) Régis Laconi	MS Aprilia Racing	Aprilia	23	+30.333	5	8
9	19	(France) Olivier Jacque	Gauloises Yamaha Tech 3	Yamaha	23	+30.428	6	7
10	31	(Japan) Tetsuya Harada	Pramac Honda Racing Team	Honda	23	+30.759	8	6
11	56	(Japan) Shinya Nakano	Gauloises Yamaha Tech 3	Yamaha	23	+34.162	14	5
12	21	(United States) John Hopkins	Red Bull Yamaha WCM	Yamaha	23	+37.715	13	4
13	18	(France) Jean-Michel Bayle	Red Bull Yamaha WCM	Yamaha	23	+1:17.803	17	3
14	17	(Netherlands) Jurgen van den Goorbergh	Kanemoto Racing	Honda	23	+1:19.800	15	2
Ret (15)	99	(United Kingdom) Jeremy McWilliams	Proton Team KR	Proton KR	18	Retirement	12	
Ret (16)	15	(Spain) Sete Gibernau	Telefónica Movistar Suzuki	Suzuki	14	Retirement	18	
Ret (17)	9	(Japan) Nobuatsu Aoki	Proton Team KR	Proton KR	9	Retirement	11	
Ret (18)	74	(Japan) Daijiro Kato	Fortuna Honda Gresini	Honda	9	Accident	16	
Ret (19)	10	(United States) Kenny Roberts Jr.	Telefónica Movistar Suzuki	Suzuki	8	Accident	10	
Ret (20)	20	(Spain) Pere Riba	Antena 3 Yamaha d'Antín	Yamaha	1	Accident	20	

== 250 cc classification ==
Pos.	No.	Rider	Manufacturer	Laps	Time/Retired	Grid	Points
1	3	(Italy) Marco Melandri	Aprilia	21	40:42.759	5	25
2	15	(Italy) Roberto Locatelli	Aprilia	21	+0.258	6	20
3	10	(Spain) Fonsi Nieto	Aprilia	21	+0.720	4	16
4	24	(Spain) Toni Elías	Aprilia	21	+1.464	3	13
5	17	(France) Randy de Puniet	Aprilia	21	+1.718	8	11
6	21	(Italy) Franco Battaini	Aprilia	21	+8.606	1	10
7	9	(Argentina) Sebastián Porto	Yamaha	21	+11.864	2	9
8	4	(Italy) Roberto Rolfo	Honda	21	+17.248	14	8
9	18	(Malaysia) Shahrol Yuzy	Yamaha	21	+28.481	7	7
10	42	(Spain) David Checa	Aprilia	21	+28.490	9	6
11	7	(Spain) Emilio Alzamora	Honda	21	+32.113	10	5
12	11	(Japan) Haruchika Aoki	Honda	21	+34.770	13	4
13	25	(France) Vincent Philippe	Aprilia	21	+51.837	18	3
14	8	(Japan) Naoki Matsudo	Yamaha	21	+51.912	12	2
15	12	(United Kingdom) Jay Vincent	Honda	21	+52.393	17	1
16	32	(Spain) Héctor Faubel	Aprilia	21	+57.112	19	
17	22	(Spain) Raúl Jara	Aprilia	21	+57.198	16	
18	19	(United Kingdom) Leon Haslam	Honda	21	+57.737	20	
Ret (19)	6	(Spain) Alex Debón	Aprilia	20	Retirement	15	
Ret (20)	28	(Germany) Dirk Heidolf	Aprilia	18	Accident	21	
Ret (21)	41	(Netherlands) Jarno Janssen	Honda	2	Retirement	23	
Ret (22)	51	(France) Hugo Marchand	Aprilia	2	Retirement	22	
Ret (23)	76	(Japan) Taro Sekiguchi	Yamaha	1	Accident	11	
DNS	27	(Australia) Casey Stoner	Aprilia		Did not start		

== 125 cc classification ==
Pos.	No.	Rider	Manufacturer	Laps	Time/Retired	Grid	Points
1	1	(San Marino) Manuel Poggiali	Gilera	20	40:20.019	1	25
2	41	(Japan) Youichi Ui	Derbi	20	+0.507	14	20
3	22	(Spain) Pablo Nieto	Aprilia	20	+0.512	26	16
4	26	(Spain) Daniel Pedrosa	Honda	20	+0.572	2	13
5	23	(Italy) Gino Borsoi	Aprilia	20	+0.675	6	11
6	4	(Italy) Lucio Cecchinello	Aprilia	20	+0.980	8	10
7	15	(San Marino) Alex de Angelis	Aprilia	20	+2.071	3	9
8	17	(Germany) Steve Jenkner	Aprilia	20	+2.072	4	8
9	21	(France) Arnaud Vincent	Aprilia	20	+2.209	5	7
10	50	(Italy) Andrea Ballerini	Honda	20	+2.255	10	6
11	16	(Italy) Simone Sanna	Aprilia	20	+2.432	9	5
12	34	(Italy) Andrea Dovizioso	Honda	20	+4.047	12	4
13	5	(Japan) Masao Azuma	Honda	20	+6.296	18	3
14	53	(Italy) Gioele Pellino	Aprilia	20	+12.881	20	2
15	7	(Italy) Stefano Perugini	Italjet	20	+36.125	13	1
16	84	(Italy) Michel Fabrizio	Gilera	20	+40.230	17	
17	30	(Italy) Gaspare Caffiero	Honda	20	+43.410	28	
18	57	(United Kingdom) Chaz Davies	Aprilia	20	+43.717	23	
19	19	(Italy) Alex Baldolini	Aprilia	20	+1:02.878	33	
20	48	(Spain) Jorge Lorenzo	Derbi	20	+1:02.888	30	
21	20	(Hungary) Imre Tóth	Honda	20	+1:02.933	32	
22	87	(Italy) Simone Corsi	Honda	20	+1:34.919	31	
Ret (23)	33	(Italy) Stefano Bianco	Aprilia	16	Accident	21	
Ret (24)	18	(Czech Republic) Jakub Smrž	Honda	9	Accident	7	
Ret (25)	8	(Hungary) Gábor Talmácsi	Italjet	9	Retirement	19	
Ret (26)	47	(Spain) Ángel Rodríguez	Aprilia	6	Accident	24	
Ret (27)	31	(Italy) Mattia Angeloni	Gilera	4	Accident	27	
Ret (28)	54	(Italy) Marco Petrini	Aprilia	4	Accident	25	
Ret (29)	25	(Spain) Joan Olivé	Honda	0	Accident	22	
Ret (30)	36	(Finland) Mika Kallio	Honda	0	Retirement	16	
Ret (31)	39	(Czech Republic) Jaroslav Huleš	Aprilia	0	Retirement	15	
Ret (32)	6	(Italy) Mirko Giansanti	Honda	0	Accident	11	
Ret (33)	80	(Spain) Héctor Barberá	Aprilia	0	Accident	29	
DNS	11	(Italy) Max Sabbatani	Aprilia		Did not start		
DNS	12	(Germany) Klaus Nöhles	Honda		Did not start		
DNS	9	(Japan) Noboru Ueda	Honda		Did not start		

== Championship standings after the race (MotoGP) ==
Below are the standings for the top five riders and constructors after round five has concluded.

Riders' Championship standings

Pos.	Rider	Points
1	(Italy) Valentino Rossi	120
2	(Japan) Tohru Ukawa	77
3	(Italy) Loris Capirossi	55
4	(Japan) Norifumi Abe	52
5	(Italy) Max Biaggi	43

Constructors' Championship standings

Pos.	Constructor	Points
1	(Japan) Honda	125
2	(Japan) Yamaha	73
3	(Japan) Suzuki	39
4	(Malaysia) / (United States) Proton KR	28
5	(Italy) Aprilia	26

- Note: Only the top five positions are included for both sets of standings.

Previous race: 2002 French Grand Prix	FIM Grand Prix World Championship; 2002 season	Next race: 2002 Catalan Grand Prix
Previous race: 2001 Italian Grand Prix	Italian motorcycle Grand Prix	Next race: 2003 Italian Grand Prix
