= Italjet Dragster =

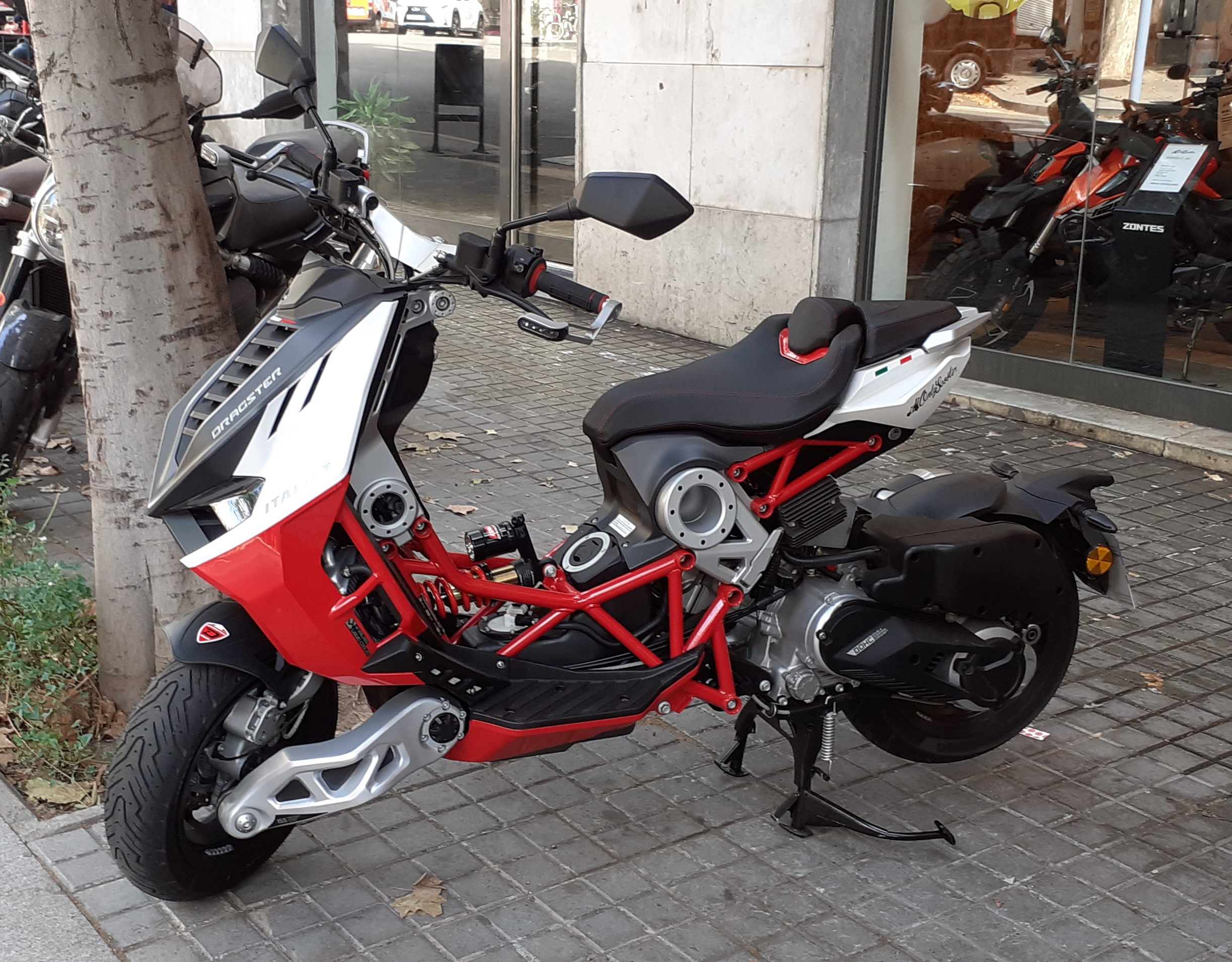
- Manufacturer: Italjet
- Production: 1998-present
- Class: Scooter

The Italjet Dragster is a mass-produced scooters by Italjet moto with a RAAD forkless front suspension and a spaceframe. Alessandro and Leopoldo Tartarini obtained a patent for this combination in 1997. A rebooted version has been released developed by Massimo Tartarini with the assistance of Andrea Dovizioso and comes in 50cc, 125cc and 180cc.

== Technology ==
The forkless front suspension is unusual for motorcycles, and the Yamaha GTS 1000 (1993–1997) might have been the inspiration for the Tartarini brothers. They applied an innovative technology and an unusual design to their scooter.

All Dragster marks are based on a space frame, which was designed for more power. The wheel dimensions are 120/70–11 front and 130/70–12 rear. The 2007 models had a 130/60–13 rear wheel. The wheelbase was 1310 mm. The mark Dragster 50 was re-edited in 2007 in addition to the mark Dragster 250. The forkless front suspension was criticised as leading to "non-harmonic and wobbly dynamics at lower speeds." Some critics complained about the noise level of the large water cooled two stroke engine, which had a catalytic converter.

== Marks ==
	Dragster 50	Dragster 125	Dragster 180	Dragster 250
Engine	one cylinder two stroke engine	one cylinder four stroke engine	one cylinder two stroke engine	one cylinder four stroke engine
Capacity	49 cc (3.0 cu in)	123 cc (7.5 cu in)	176 cc (10.7 cu in)	244 cc (14.9 cu in)
Bore × stroke	41 mm × 37.4 mm (1.61 in × 1.47 in)	55 mm × 52 mm (2.2 in × 2.0 in)	65.6 mm × 52 mm (2.58 in × 2.05 in)	72 mm × 60 mm (2.8 in × 2.4 in)
Power/rpm	3.3 kW (4.4 hp); 6,800 rpm	10.6 kW (14.2 hp); 7,500 rpm	14 kW (19 hp); 8,000 rpm	16.2 kW (21.7 hp)
Top speed	50 km/h (31 mph)	103 km/h (64 mph)	122 km/h (76 mph)	125 km/h (78 mph)

== Gallery ==
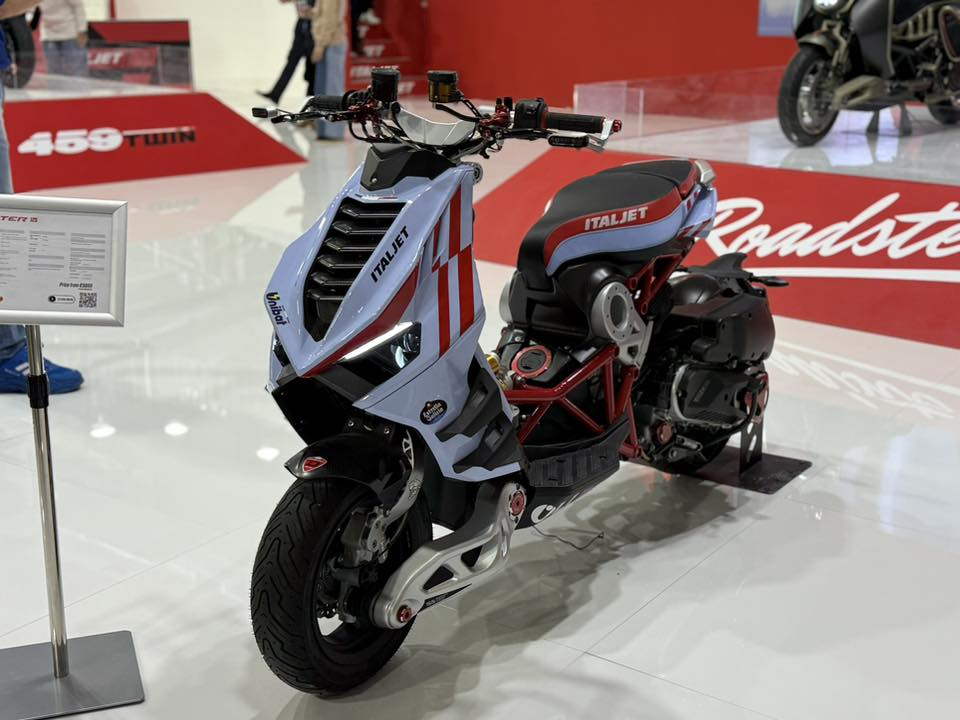
2026 Dragster 125

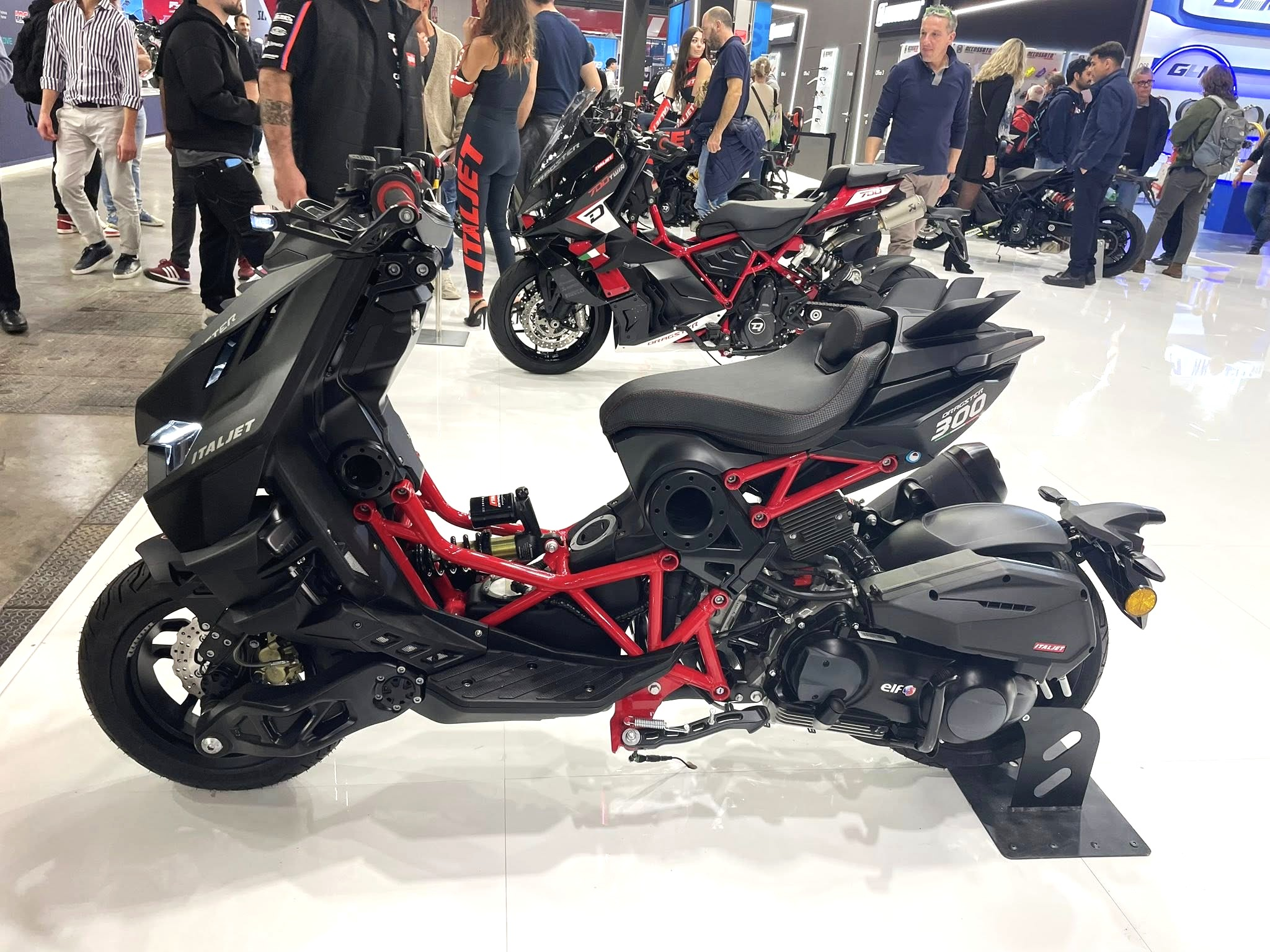
2026 Dragster 300

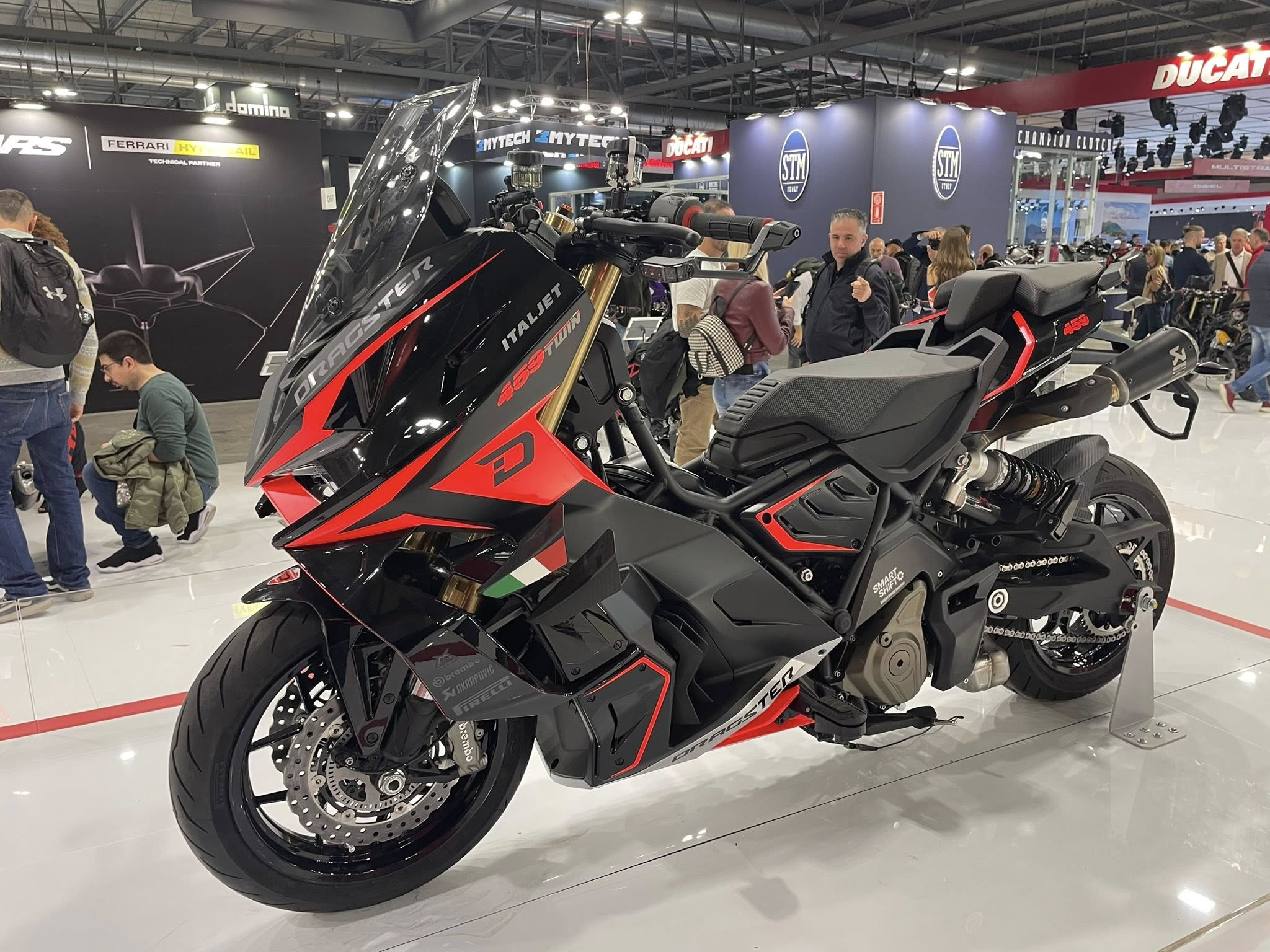
2026 Dragster 459 Twin

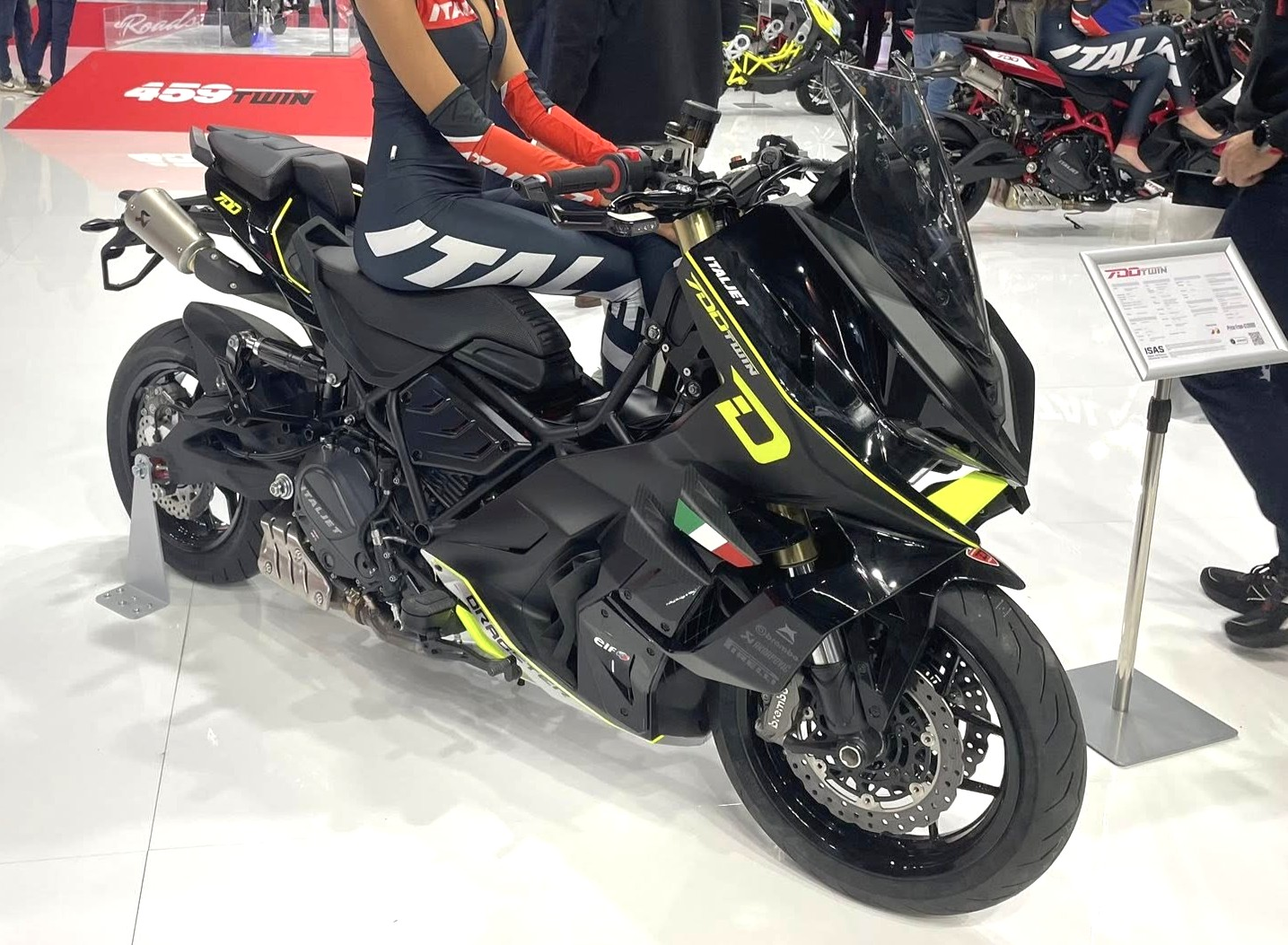
2026 Dragster 700 Twin

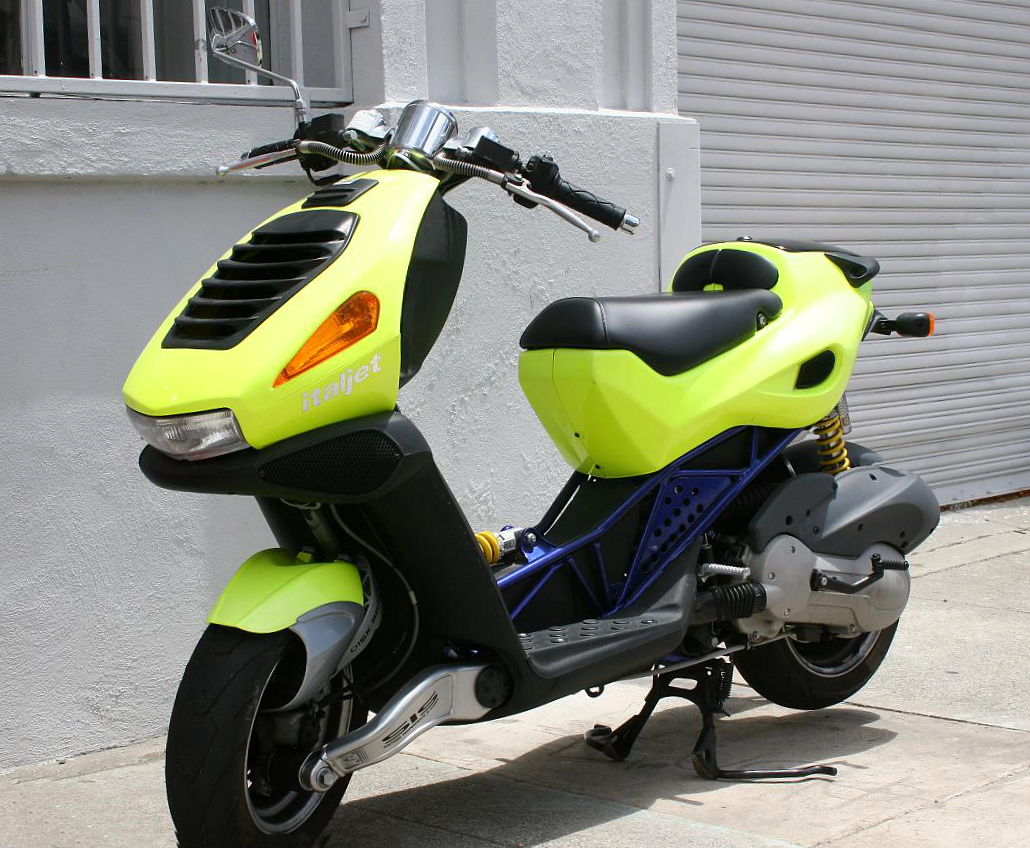
Dragster 180
