= Italjet =

Italian motorcycle manufacturer

Italjet Moto SpA
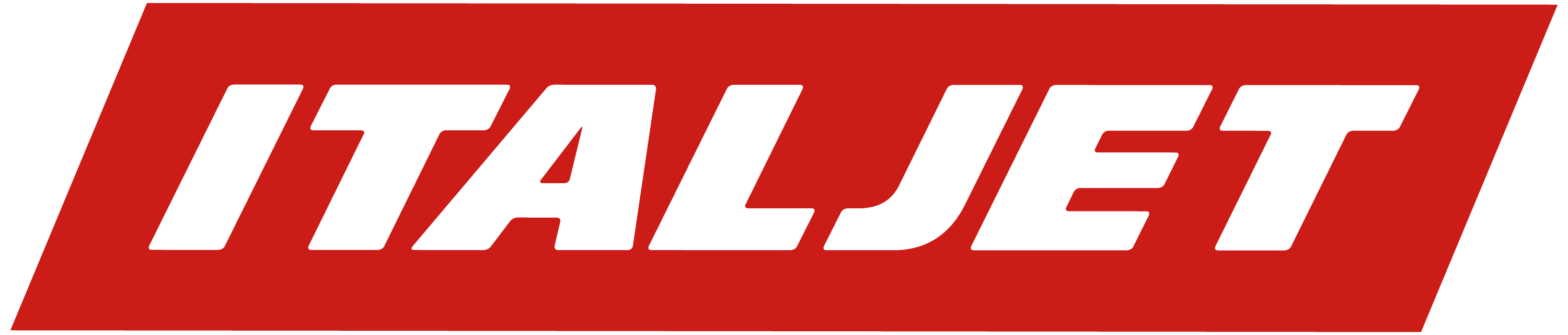
- Type: Private
- Industry: Motorcycle manufacturing
- Founded: 4 February 1960; 66 years ago in Bologna
- Founder: Leopoldo Tartarini
- Headquarters: Castel Guelfo di Bologna, Italy
- Area served: Worldwide
- Products: Motorcycles; Scooters; E-bike; Moped; Minibike
- Website: italjet.com

Italjet Moto SpA (Italjet) is an Italian manufacturer of motorcycles, headquartered in Castel Guelfo di Bologna, Bologna, Italy. While the ideas and commercial agreements were made in 1959, the company was officially founded as Italemmezeta on 4 February 1960 in Bologna by Leopoldo Tartarini (1932–2015).

Since 2025, Italjet sponsors the Gresini Racing Team in the Moto2 class.

== History ==
The history of Italjet began in 1959 in Bologna's "Motor Valley" and is linked to the Tartarini family. The founder, Leopoldo Tartarini, was a motorcycle racer from the 1950s who won the Motogiro d'Italia and the Milano-Taranto multiple times. After a bad fall forced him to retire from racing, he proposed to Ducati, the company he raced for, that they organize a trip around the world — a feat that was considered nearly impossible at the time.

Leopoldo Tartarini began building motorcycles using MZ engines, which led to the name Italemmezeta. The first product was a 125cc bike powered by an East German two-stroke engine. This was followed in 1962 by a sporty moped named Italjet, with lines inspired by contemporary Ducatis. In 1964, the Mustang was born — another sporty moped with innovative features, which later evolved into the Mustang Veloce.

Italjet is well known for its design, with vehicles displayed in the MoMA and Guggenheim museums in New York. The company's models would find great success both in Italy and abroad, winning various championships. In the late 1960s, the company renewed its lineup by introducing a series of off-road mini-bikes and models designed for competitive off-road racing. Italjet became the Italian importer for ČZ motocross bikes and for Yamaha. Using the Japanese company's engines, they created the twin-cylinder Buccaneer 125 road bike and the Mad enduro.

After their partnership with Yamaha ended, Italjet began importing and distributing Bultaco in Italy (1977). In 1978, the company released the Pack-A-Way, a moped that revisited some ideas from the earlier Kit-Kat model. This evolved in 1980 into the Pack 2, which used the engine and transmission from the Piaggio Ciao. The Ranger trike also used Piaggio mechanics from the Ape light commercial vehicle.

== Products ==
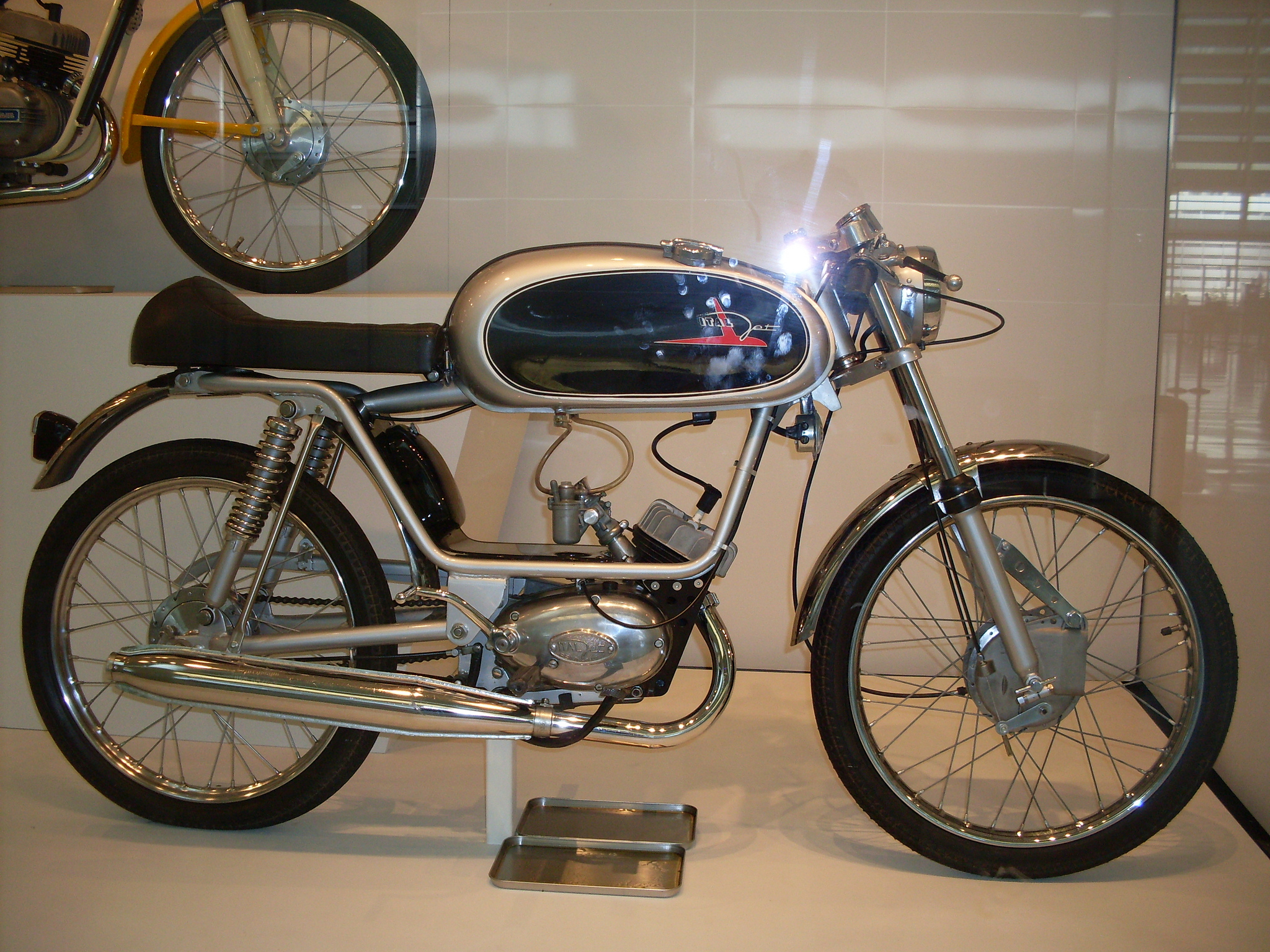
Italjet Mustang Veloce

Italjet Buccaneer

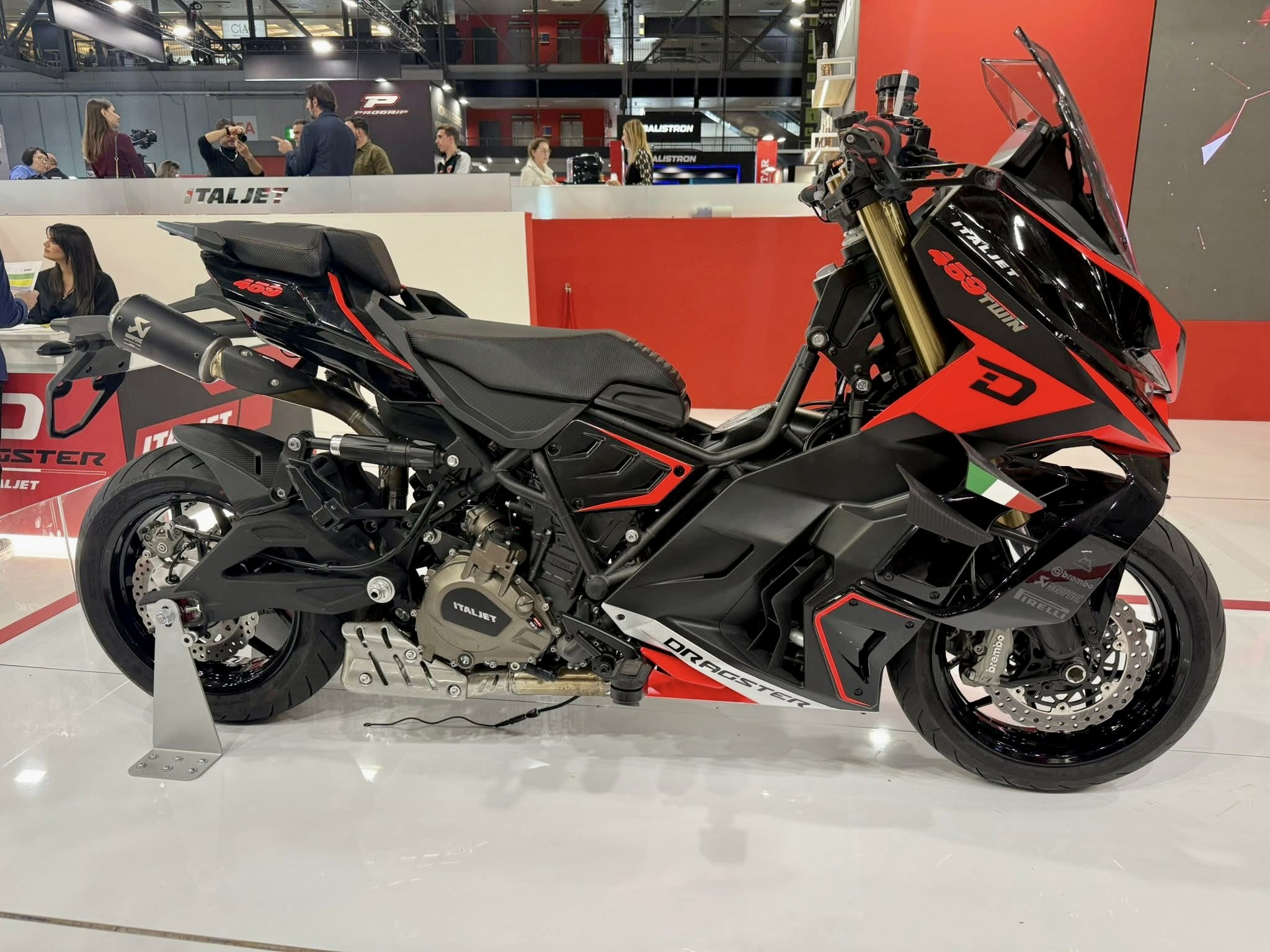
Italjet Dragster 459

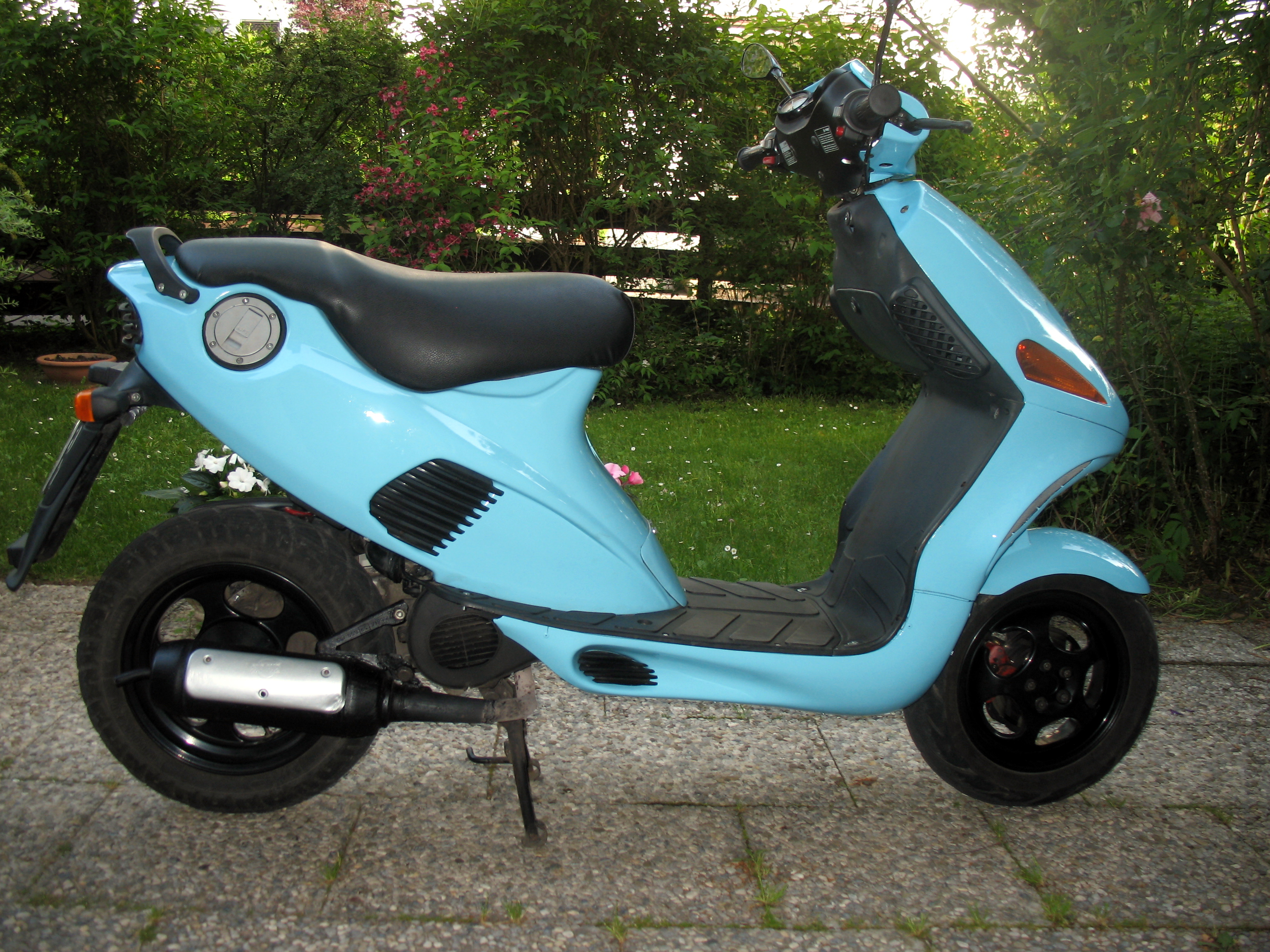
Italjet Formula 50 AC

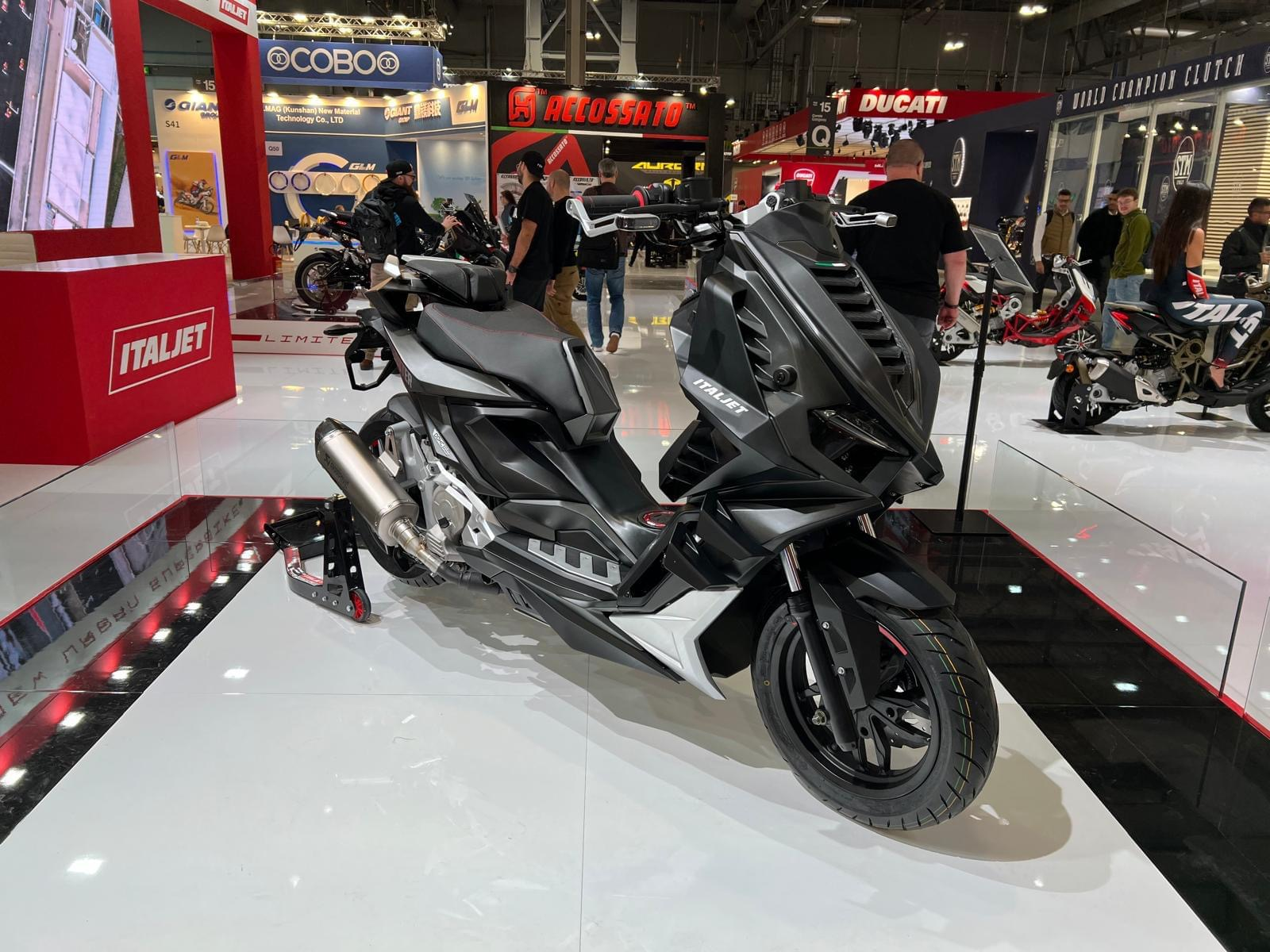
Italjet Speedster

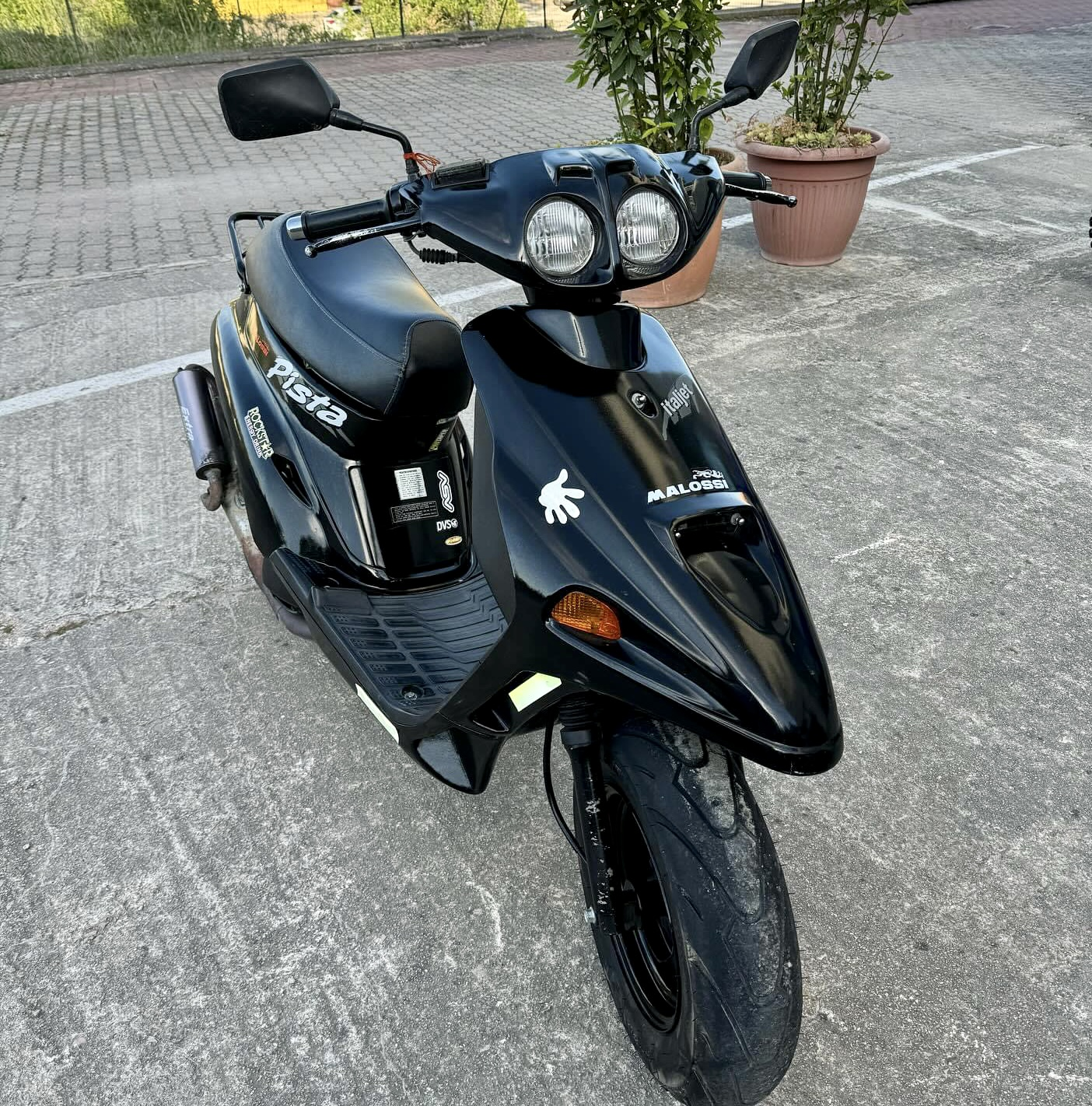
Italjet Pista 50

- Buccaneer
- Dragster 125
- Dragster 300
- Dragster 459
- Dragster 700
- Formula 50
- Formula 125
- Mustang Veloce
- Roadster 400
- Pista 50
- Speedster 125
- Speedster 200

== See also ==
- List of electric bicycle brands and manufacturers
- List of Italian companies
- List of motorcycle manufacturers
