= KMZ =

KMZ may refer to:

- Keyhole Markup Language files when compressed

== Organizations ==
- Kievskiy Mototsikletniy Zavod, a Soviet / Ukrainian maker of the Dnepr series of motorcycles
- Kovrovskiy Mekhanicheskiy Zavod, a Soviet / Russian weapon manufacturer and former maker of the AEK-971 series of rifles
- Krasnogorskiy Zavod (formerly known as Krasnogorskiy Mekhanicheskiy Zavod), a Soviet / Russian maker of optics and cameras
- Különleges Műveleti Zászlóalj, the Special forces of the Hungarian Army
- Kyoto Municipal Zoo, a small 3.4-hectare (8.4-acre) zoo located in Sakyō ward, Kyoto and was established in 1903, making it the second oldest zoo in the country after Ueno Zoo in Tokyo

== People ==
- Khyril Muhymeen Zambri (born 1987), Malaysian footballer who plays as a striker for Negeri Sembilan FA. He also a winger for Malaysia national, Malaysia U-23 and former Malaysia U-20 squad. He scored 3 league goals in his debut season (2005)
- Klaus Martin Ziegler (1929–1993), German choral conductor, organist and Protestant church musician
- Karl Michael Ziehrer (1843–1922), Austrian composer. In his lifetime, he was one of the fiercest rivals of the Strauss family; most notably Johann Strauss II and Eduard Strauss.
  - K M Ziehrer, abbreviation for the above
- Kenneth Zeichner (1947-), Hoefs-Bascom Professor of Teacher Education and Associate Dean for Teacher Education, University of Wisconsin–Madison, Madison, Wisconsin, United States
  - Kenneth M. Zeichner, fuller name for the above

== Other ==
- KHL Medveščak Zagreb, a Croatian ice hockey team that currently plays in the Bobrov Division in the Kontinental Hockey League
- KHL Mladost Zagreb, a Croatian ice hockey team that currently plays in the Croatian Ice Hockey Championship.
- Khorasani Turkic (ISO code kmz), a Turkic language spoken in Iran
