= Dnepr M-72 =

Motorcycle built by the Soviet Union

M-72
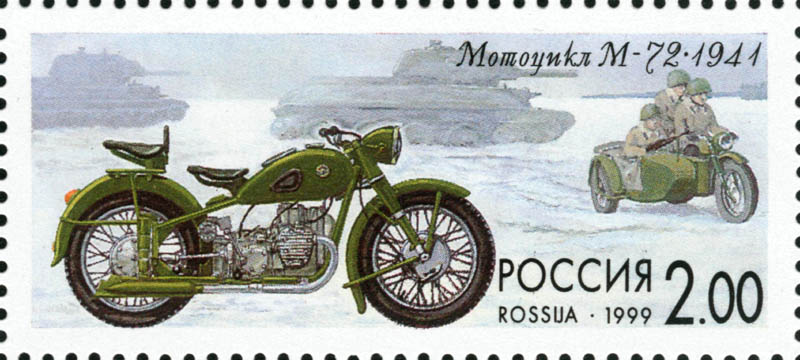
- M-72 motorcycle celebrated on a 1999 Russian 2 rouble stamp
- Manufacturer: USSR, various state factories
- Production: 1942–1960
- Engine: 746 cc (45.5 cu in) Side-valve 4-stroke flat twin, Overhead valve 4-stroke flat twin
- Bore / stroke: 78 mm × 78 mm (3.1 in × 3.1 in)
- Power: 18 hp (13 kW)
- Weight: 225 kg (496 lb) (conventional); 350 kg (770 lb) (sidecar) (wet)
- Related: BMW R-71; Ural (motorcycle); Dnepr (motorcycle)

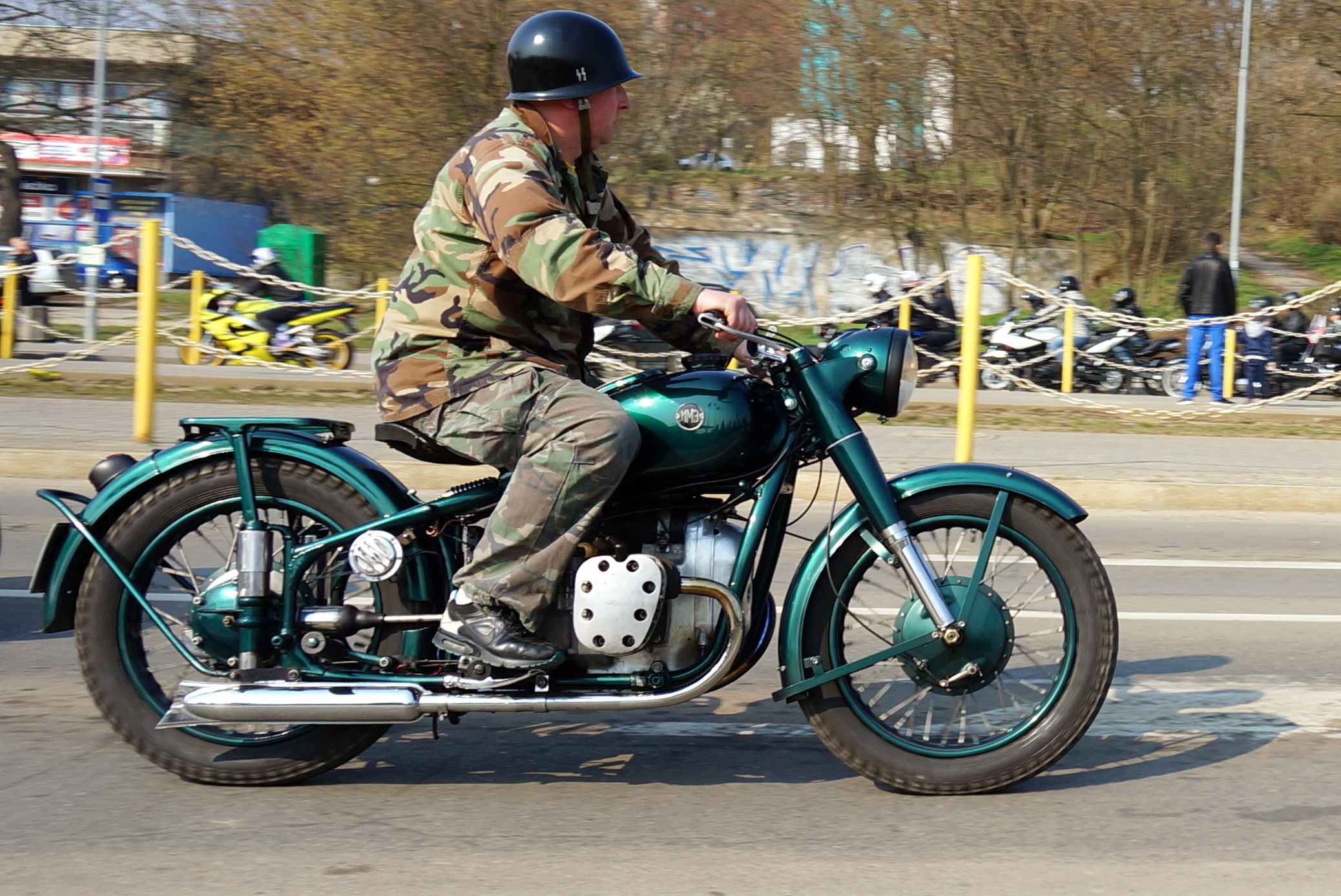
IMZ (M-72)

The M-72 was a motorcycle built by the Soviet Union. Conceived as a replacement for the two heavy motorcycles used by the Red Army, the TIZ-AM-600 and PMZ-A-750, both of which had performed unsatisfactorily during the Winter War against Finland and were considered outdated designs. The replacement chosen was the BMW R71, which had been rejected by the German Wehrmacht as a replacement for the R12. As a result of the Molotov–Ribbentrop Pact, the necessary legal, political and economic procedures were in place for BMW to provide the design, tooling and training for the manufacture of the motorcycle and military sidecar.

== History ==
The M-72 was intended to be built at three factories located in Moscow, Leningrad and Kharkiv, with ancillary items coming from several other factories. Only the MMZ factory in Moscow produced any complete motorcycles prior to the German invasion in 1941 and commencement of the Eastern Front.

Then, the Moscow factory was moved east to the town of Irbit in Western Siberia, becoming the Irbit Motorcycle Factory (IMZ). The Kharkiv and Leningrad factories were relocated to Gorky on the outskirts of the GAZ plant, becoming the Gorky Motorcycle Plant (GMZ). During the war, motorcycles were produced at both factories. However, all sidecars for both the M-72 and Lend-Lease bikes were produced at Gorky only.

In 1952, 500 M-72 engines were shipped from the IMZ to the KMZ factory in Kyiv to produce their first batch of M-72s. KMZ produced the M-72 until 1956. A closely related model, the M-72N, was produced later.

In 1957, the Soviets sold the M-72 production line to the People's Republic of China. The IMZ plant supplied M-72s to China up to the transfer of the production line in 1957 and continued to supply parts to China until 1960. Production continued in China through the mid-1980s. The M-72's current descendant is the CJ750 of the Chang Jiang series.

== Design ==
M-72 motorcycles were predominantly produced with a sidecar attached, although some solos made appearances for escort duties and the like.

M-72 were produced at IMZ in Irbit from 1942 until 1955. A subsequent model, the M-72M was produced from 1955 until 1960.

== See also ==
- List of motorcycles of the 1940s
- List of motorcycles of the 1950s
