= IZh (motorcycle) =

Brand of Russian motorcycles

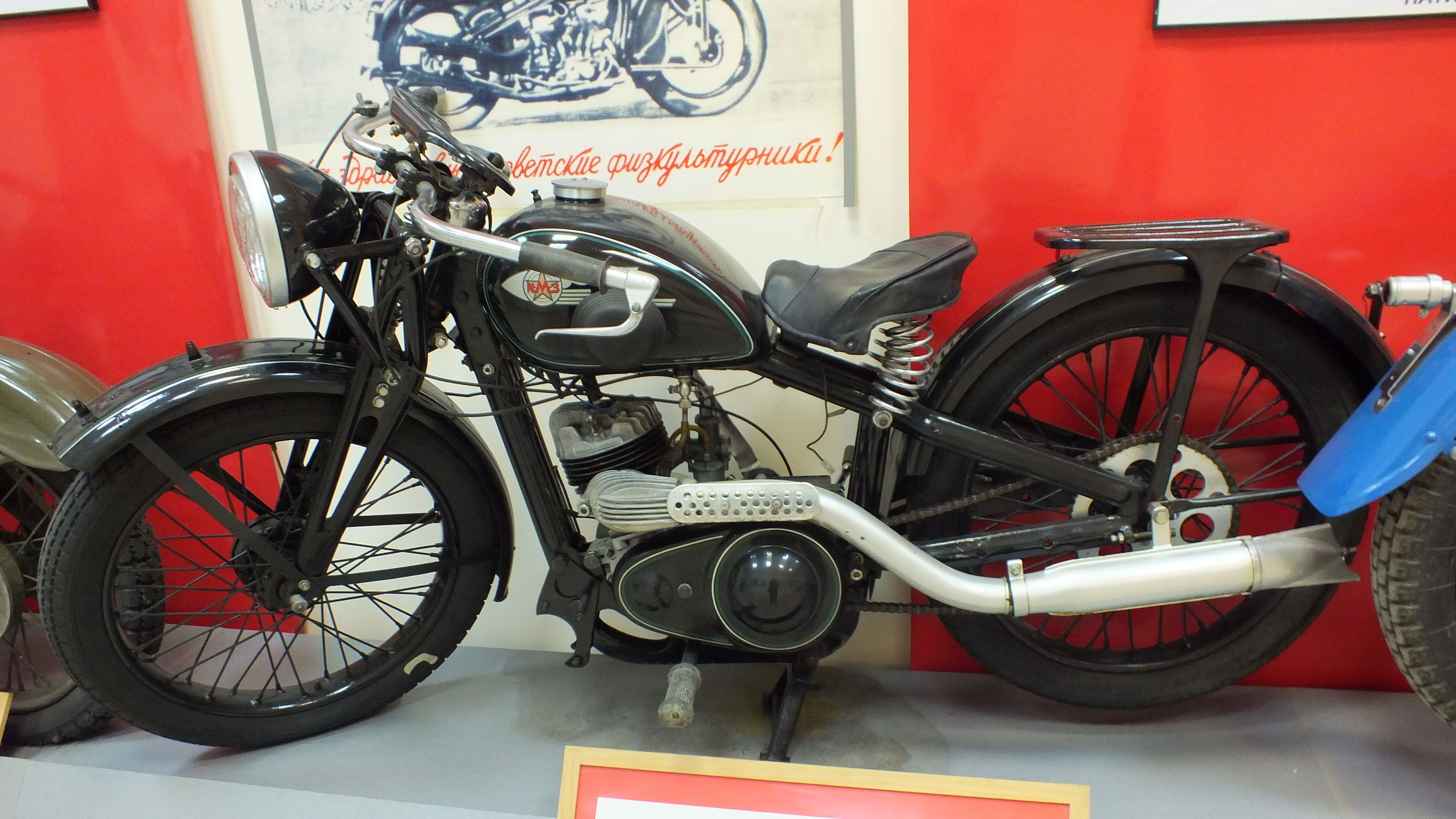
IZh-8 (1938)

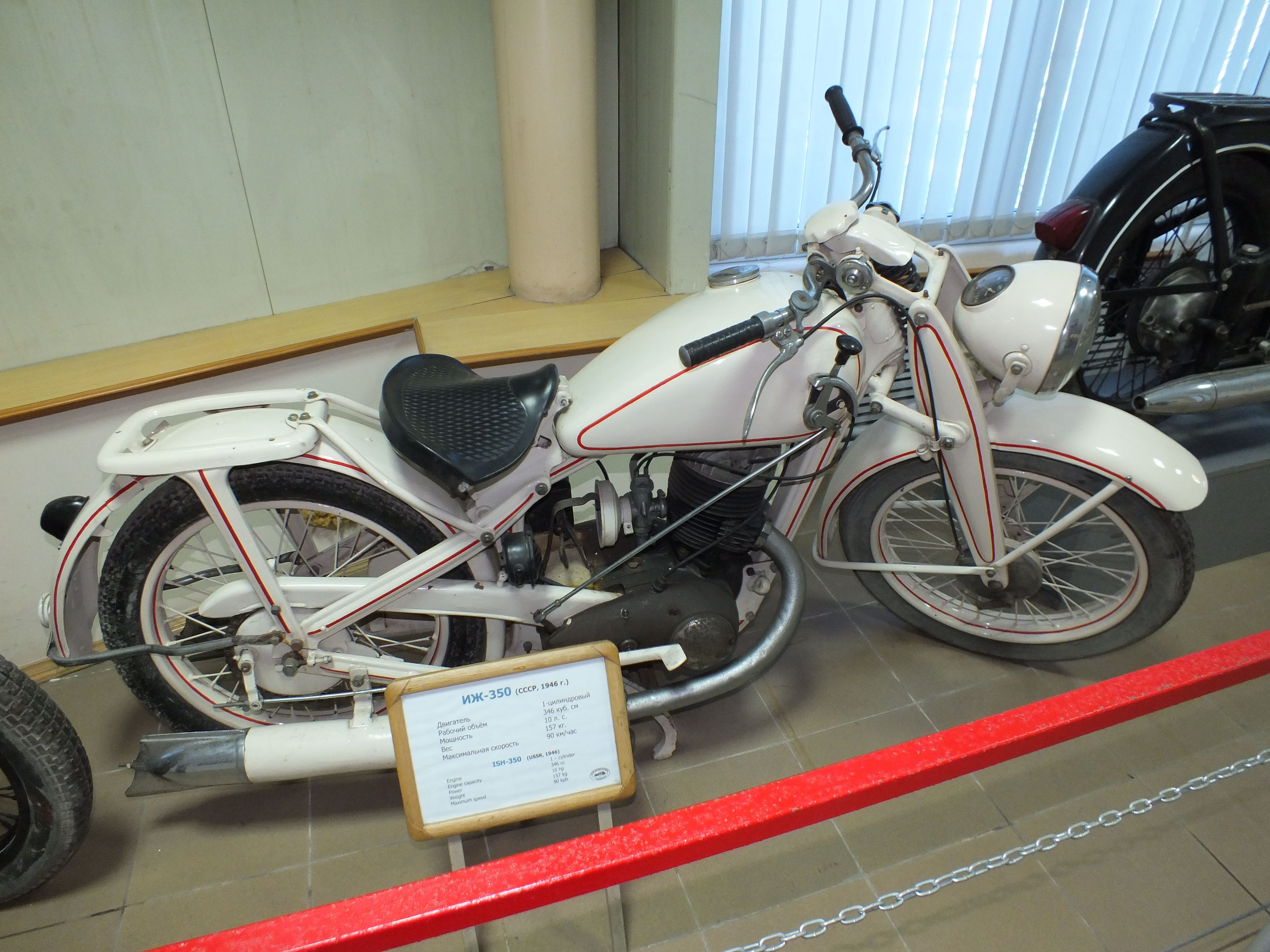
IZh-350 (1946)

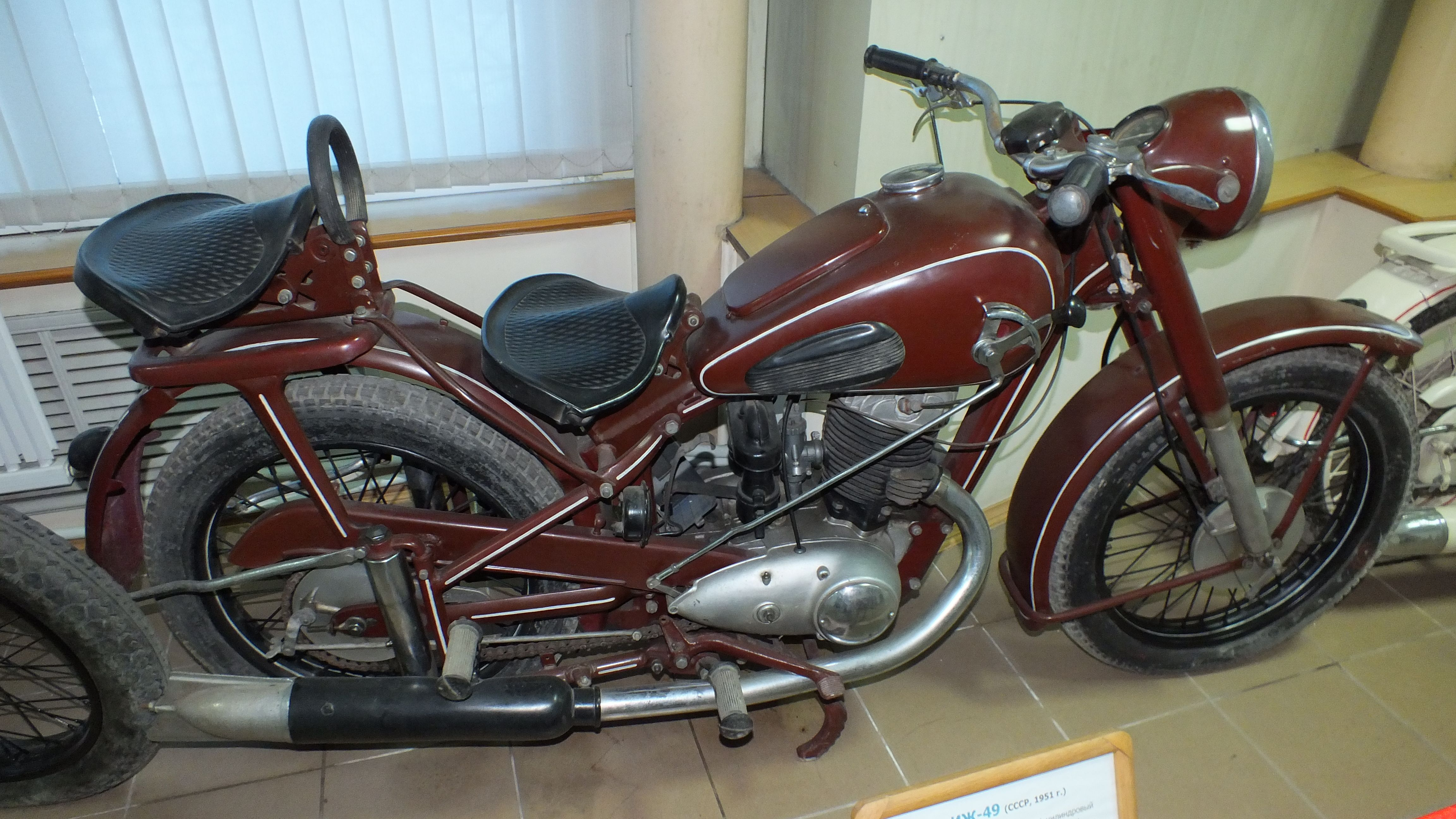
IZh-49 (1951)

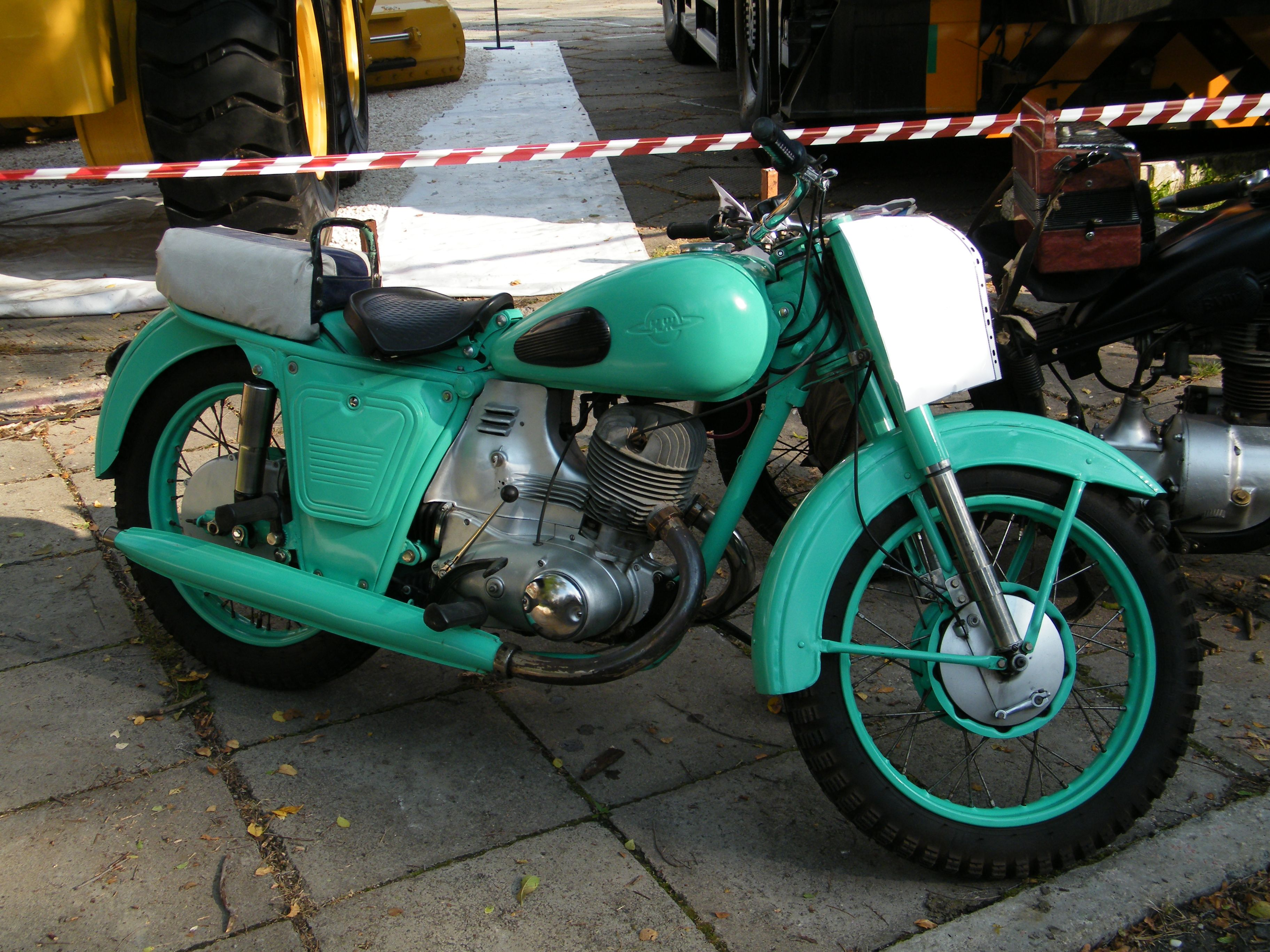
IZh-56 (1956)

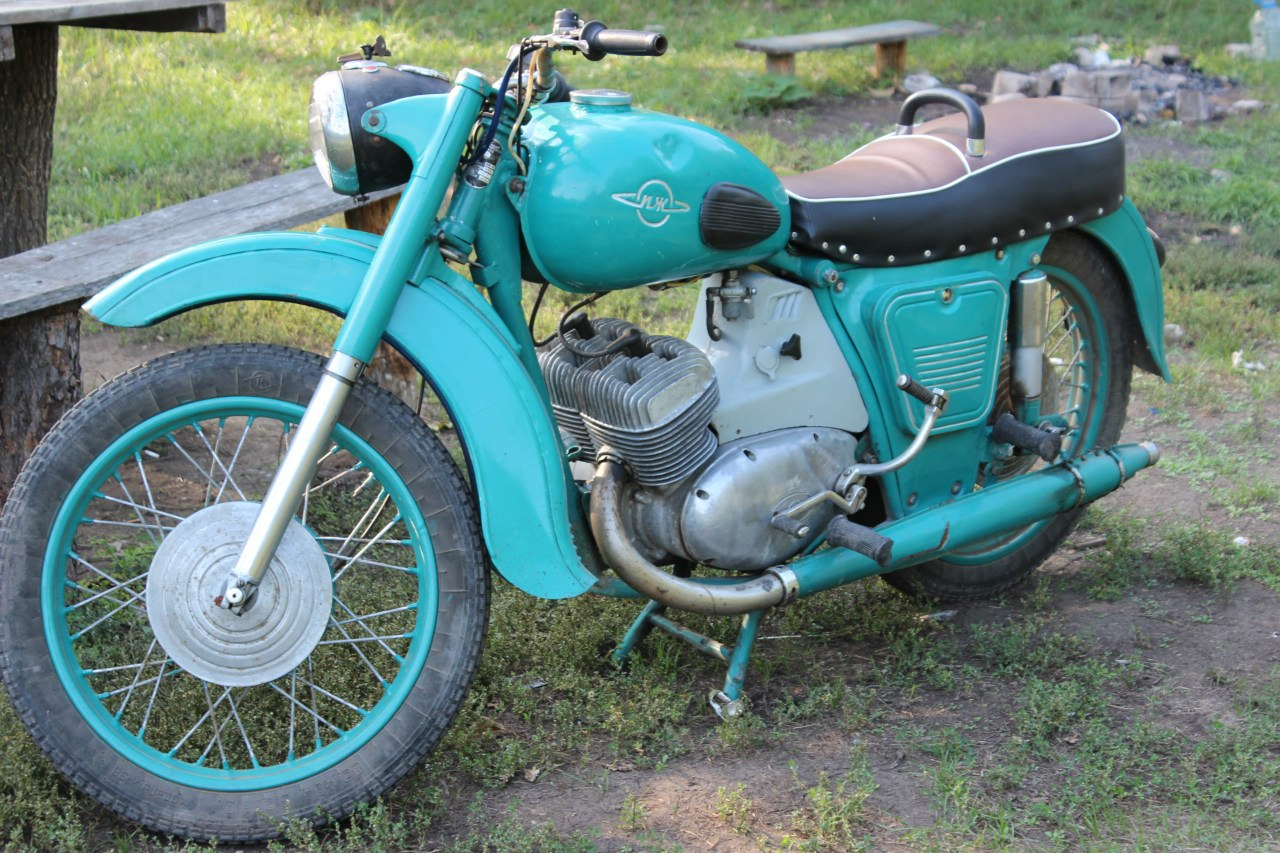
IZh Jupiter-2 (1966)

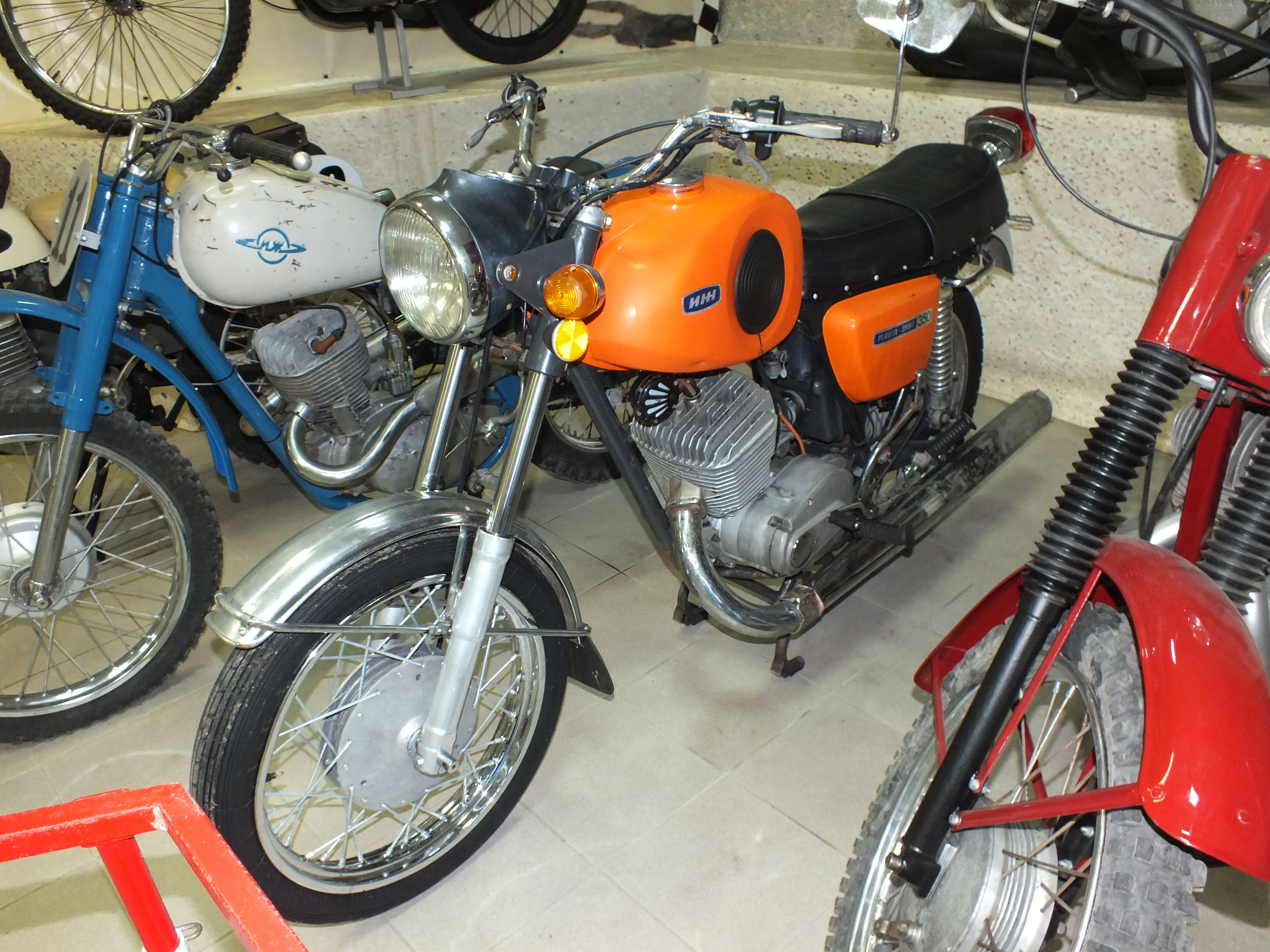
IZh Planeta Sport 350 (1973), behind it one of the sports IZh models

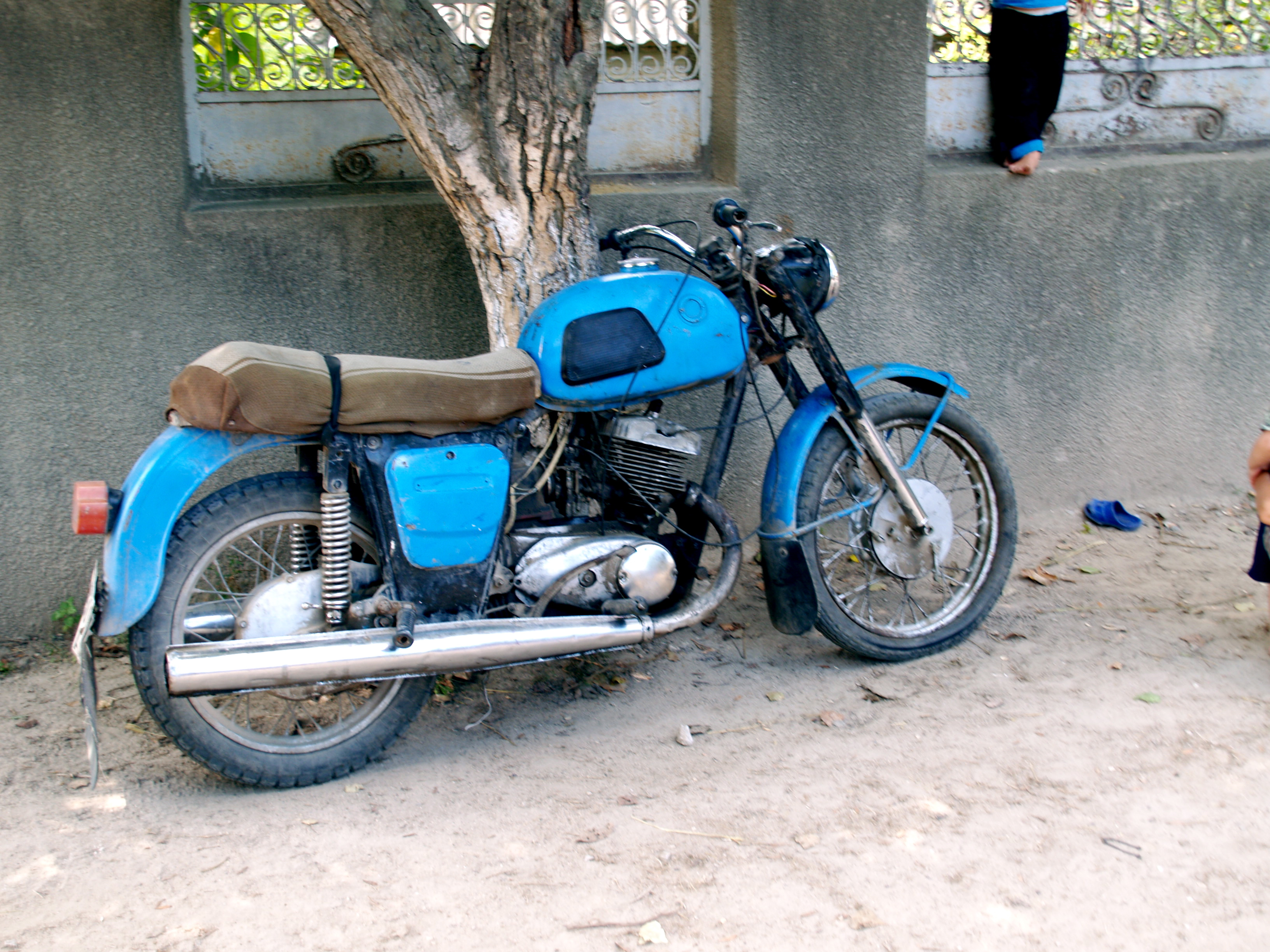
IZh Planeta-3-01 (1978)

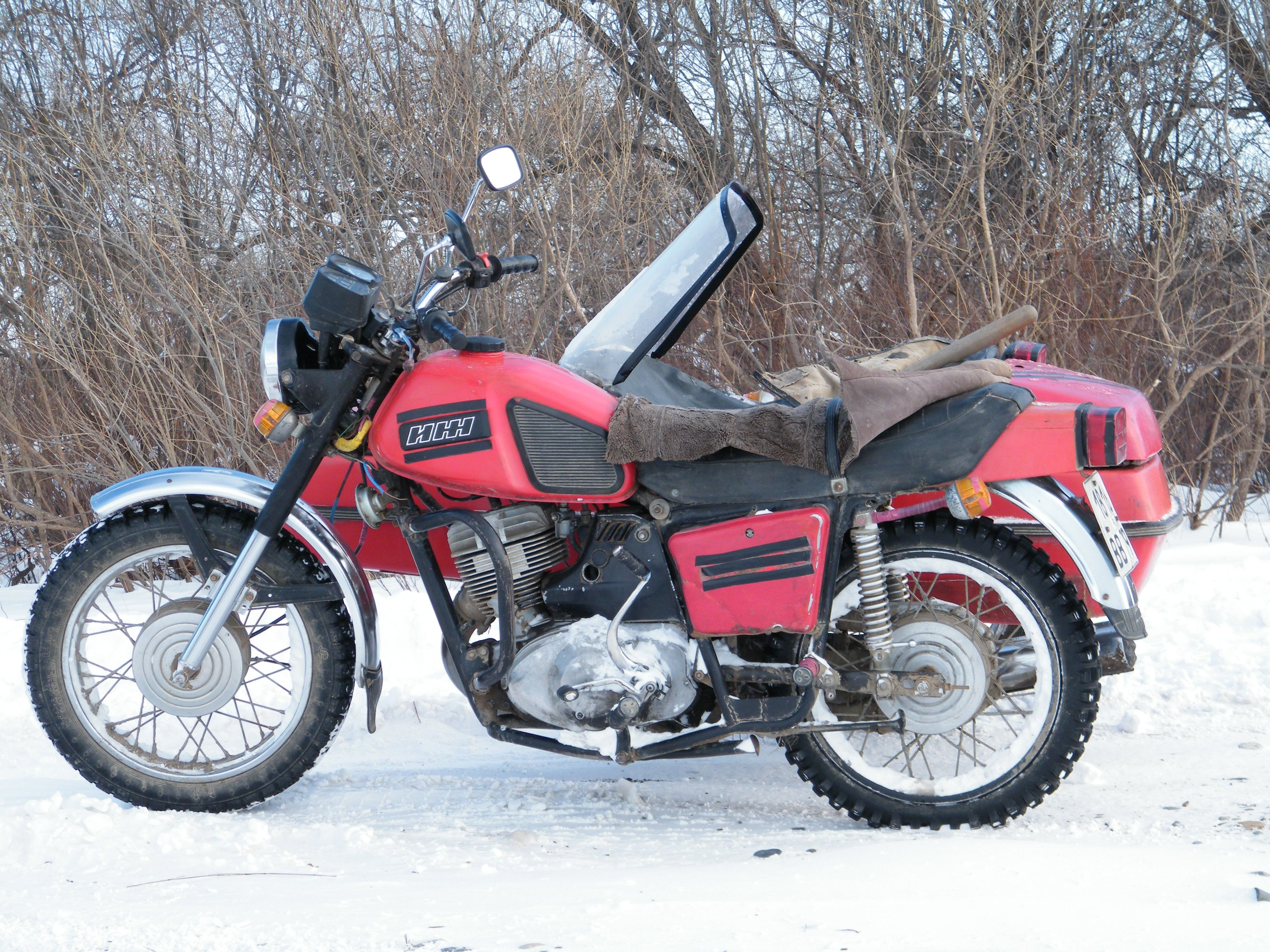
IZh Planeta-5K with a sidecar

IZh (Russian: Иж) is a brand of Soviet Union motorcycles produced between 1933 and 2008 in Izhevsk by the state industry of the Soviet Union and later Russia. The first motorcycles under this brand were created in 1929, and from 1933, they were mass-produced by the IzhMZ plant. After World War II, IZh motorcycles were manufactured by the Izhevsk Machine-Building Plant, and from 1996, by the company Izhmash-Moto. It was one of the main motorcycle manufacturers in the Soviet Union, with over 10 million IZh motorcycles produced by 1999. After the war, the factory specialized in mid-range motorcycles of the 350 cc class and also produced sports motorcycles until the 1990s. In addition to motorcycles, the Lada Izhevsk brand – named after the river – was also used for cars produced by Izhmash (later IzhAvto) and other products.

== History ==
=== First experimental designs ===
After World War I, until the late 1920s, the centrally planned Soviet economy did not produce motorcycles, and earlier, in pre-revolutionary Russia, they had been manufactured on a small scale. It was only towards the end of that decade that the authorities recognized the motorcycle as an efficient and relatively inexpensive means of mass motorization. With the support of the Avtodor society, which promoted the development of motorization and roads, a decision was made to start designing domestic motorcycles at the machine and armament factories in Izhevsk (then known as Izhstalzavod, part of the Ruzpultrust association). One of the reasons for choosing this location was the high production quality of the plant, which was linked to its arms manufacturing. In 1928, a team of engineers was assembled there under the leadership of Pyotr Mozharov, tasked with developing motorcycle designs based on the best solutions found in foreign models. The work was carried out in experimental workshops located at the former Berezin Arms Factory.

In 1929, five different experimental motorcycles (IZh-1 to IZh-5) were built there, later participating that year in the second All-Union motorcycle rally to Moscow, covering a distance of 3,300 km. These were the first motorcycles built in the Soviet Union, following the experimental Soyuz motorcycle from 1925. Among them, the IZh-1 and IZh-2 were heavy machines with a 1,200 cc longitudinally mounted V-twin engine. The smallest model, the IZh-4 (equipped with a foreign 200 cc engine), was considered the most promising. However, none of the motorcycles were approved for production by the authorities due to the factory being overloaded with other tasks, and experimental work in Izhevsk was discontinued. To accelerate motorcycle production, the authorities decided to copy the German DKW Luxus 300 and manufacture it in Leningrad as the L-300. Meanwhile, Soviet engineers continued developing new motorcycles at the NATI institute.

=== Production before World War II ===
In 1932, the Soviet industrial authorities decided to start mass motorcycle production in Izhevsk, and construction began on a specialized factory called IzhMZ (ИжМЗ). The factory's emblem used the abbreviation "IMZ" (ИМЗ), which would later be used for factories in Irbit as well. The plan was for the factory to produce designs developed elsewhere, but it soon began improving and developing them further. The chief designer became Vyacheslav Rogozhin. The new factory began operations in 1933, unveiling 4 pre-production heavy motorcycles, the PMZ-A-750 (746 cc), for the May Day celebrations of that year. However, their serial production was transferred to the PMZ in Podolsk after the necessary documentation was completed in Izhevsk.

In the same year, the production of medium motorcycles, the IZh-7 (293 cc), was launched in Izhevsk. The IZh-7 was an improved version of the L-300 from Leningrad (a copy of the DKW Luxus 300). In the first year, 12 units were produced, in 1934 – 111, in 1935 – 451, and in 1936 – 2,207. The IZh-7 was followed by its upgraded versions, developed in Izhevsk, featuring strengthened engines: the IZh-8 in 1938, and later the IZh-9. The production plan for 1939 anticipated 4,300 motorcycles.

In 1941, the production of the IZh-12 model, with a 348 cc four-stroke engine, taken from the new Leningrad L-8 motorcycle, was launched. However, only 49 units were completed. Following the German attack on the Soviet Union, motorcycle production was halted in November 1941 in favor of arms production, and the motorcycle factory was evacuated to Irbit. There, based on several evacuated plants, a new motorcycle factory was created, later known by the brand Ural.

=== After World War II ===
Shortly after the end of World War II, Dmitry Ustinov, the People's Commissar for Armaments, decided in 1946 to resume motorcycle production at the IzhMash plant. The first model planned was a copy of the German light DKW RT 125, but the plant management succeeded in convincing Ustinov of the benefits of producing medium-sized motorcycles, as had been done before the war (the RT 125 was already being produced in Moscow and Kirov as M1A and K-125). The German DKW NZ 350 (346 cc) was chosen as the basis, and an improved version was developed, the IZh-350, which was produced from late 1946 to 1951, including a sports version, the IZh-350S. Documentation and equipment were assembled with the help of DKW plants as part of war reparations. A new factory was built in a different location than before the war. In 1946, 83 units were produced, followed by 2,357 motorcycles in 1947 despite a fire at the factory, and in the next year, 16,042 units.

In 1951, the IZh-350 was replaced by the improved IZh-49 (346 cc), which was produced until 1958. The IZh-49 introduced a more modern suspension system and became the first model to surpass half a million units produced. In 1954, a Special Design Bureau No. 61 was established at the plant to design further motorcycles that went beyond the German prototype. In 1956, a sidecar for the IZh-49 was developed, and production was placed at Vyatskiye Polyany Machine-Building Plant in Vyatskiye Polyany. Sidecars were also produced for subsequent IZh models, marked with an additional "K" (for "kolaska" – "sidecar").

Starting in 1956, the IZh-56 (346 cc) was introduced with a new frame, an improved engine, and updated styling. This model was further developed into the IZh Planeta series, which was gradually modernized and produced in subsequent generations from 1962 onward for the next four decades. From 1961, the IZh Jupiter motorcycle with a parallel twin engine (347 cc), based on the new German DKW RT 350, was also produced alongside the Planeta. Both lines of models were standardized, differing mainly in engine configuration. In 1966, the Planeta-2 and Jupiter-2 were launched, followed by the Planeta-3 and Jupiter-3 in 1970 and 1971. In later series, engine power was increased, styling was modernized, and further improvements were introduced.

The reason for producing two similar models with the same engine capacity was that the Jupiter provided higher power, performance, and comfort, while the single-cylinder Planeta was simpler to maintain and more suited for slower travel on poor roads, which was particularly relevant in rural areas of the Soviet Union. The Planeta was also cheaper (for example, in 1977, the IZh Planeta-3 cost 650 rubles, the Jupiter-3 – 740 rubles, and the Jupiter-3K with a sidecar – 1,040 rubles).

In 1973, the Planeta Sport 350 was introduced, featuring a more powerful single-cylinder engine with a displacement of 340 cc. Despite its high performance, production was limited, and the model was more expensive than the regular models (in 1977, it cost 1,000 rubles). Throughout the post-war period, IZh plants were also one of the main suppliers of motorcycles used in Soviet motorcycle sports; sport models were still identified by numbers.

=== From the 1980s to the 21st century ===
In the 1980s and 1990s, the IZh plant continued to produce modernized models of the Planeta-4, Planeta-5, Jupiter-4, and Jupiter-5, all of which were based on designs from the late 1950s. In the early 1980s, the acquisition of Yamaha XT550 technology was expected to improve the situation, but prototypes such as the Orion (road) and Marafon (universal) models were never mass-produced. Only some components, like the front suspension, cast wheels, and disc brakes, were adapted for use in production models starting in 1990.

In 1960, the plant produced its millionth motorcycle, followed by the 2-millionth in 1965, the 3-millionth in 1970, the 6-millionth in 1981, the 8-millionth in 1986, and the 10.7-millionth in 1999. At its peak, the plant produced around 300,000 motorcycles annually.

After the shift to a market economy in the 1990s, the IZh plant faced economic difficulties due to competition and declining domestic demand, similar to many other Soviet-era large factories producing outdated and low-quality products. The plant maintained exports to developing countries, where simple motorcycles were still in demand. On June 22, 1996, the motorcycle division was separated into a joint-stock subsidiary company, IzhMash-Moto, which remained under the IzhMash umbrella. In 1998, a version of the Jupiter-5 motorcycle with a new 347 cc water-cooled engine was introduced, developed by the Izhevsk Mechanical Plant, the manufacturer of the Jupiter engines.

In 2001, the company began producing a completely new model, the Junkier, designed in the "chopper" style, with a water-cooled 347 cc engine. These motorcycles were purchased, among others, by the Russian police. In 2000, the plant also introduced a light motorcycle (moped) called Kornet, powered by a 50 cc engine (produced by Vyatskiye Polyany Machine-Building Plant). Additionally, motorcycles with a 249 cc single-cylinder four-stroke engine, such as the Planeta-7, Springbok, and Saigak, were also introduced.

On 1 April 2008, production of IZh motorcycles ceased due to financial difficulties at the IzhMash conglomerate and the company's non-competitive offerings compared to foreign motorcycles, leading to a sharp decline in demand (to around 5,000 motorcycles per year, while the plant was designed for production of several hundred thousand units).

== Designs ==
=== Before World War II ===
- IZh-1, IZh-2 (1929) – experimental, 1,200 cc, 2-cylinder V engine, 24 hp
- IZh-3 (1929) – experimental, 750 cc Wanderer engine, V2
- IZh-4 (1929) – experimental, 200 cc Stock engine
- IZh-5 (1929) – experimental, 400 cc engine
- IZh-7 (1933–1938) – 293 cc, 1-cylinder, 2-stroke engine, 6.5 hp
- IZh-8 (1938–1939) – 293 cc, 1-cylinder, 2-stroke engine, 8 hp
- IZh-9 (1939–1941) – 293 cc, 1-cylinder, 2-stroke engine, 9 hp
- IZh-12 (1941) – 348.4 cc, 1-cylinder, 4-stroke engine, 13.5 hp (49 units)

=== After World War II ===
- IZh-350 (1946–1951) – 346 cc, 1-cylinder, 2-stroke engine, 10.5 hp (126,267 units)
- IZh-49 (1951–1958) – 346 cc, 1-cylinder, 2-stroke engine, 10.5 hp (507,603 units)
- IZh-56 (1956–1962) – 346 cc, 1-cylinder, 2-stroke engine, 13 hp (677,428 units)
- IZh Jupiter, IZh-Ju (1961–1966) – 347 cc, 2-cylinder, 2-stroke engine, 18 hp (447,747 units)
- IZh Planeta (1962–1967) – 346 cc, 1-cylinder, 2-stroke engine, 13 hp (405,303 units)
- IZh Planeta-2 (1966–1971) – 346 cc, 1-cylinder, 2-stroke engine, 15.5 hp (246,486 units)
- IZh Jupiter-2 (1966–1971) – 347 cc, 2-cylinder, 2-stroke engine, 22 hp (766,487 units)
- IZh Planeta-3 (1970–1977) – 346 cc, 1-cylinder, 2-stroke engine, 18 hp (478,496 units)
- IZh Jupiter-3 (1971–1977) – 347 cc, 2-cylinder, 2-stroke engine, 25 hp (296,711 units)
- IZh Planeta Sport 350 (1973–1984) – 340 cc, 1-cylinder, 2-stroke engine, 30 hp (215,210 units)
- IZh Planeta-3-01 (1978–1981) – 346 cc, 1-cylinder, 2-stroke engine, 20 hp (400,842 units)
- IZh Jupiter-3-01 (1978–1980) – 347 cc, 2-cylinder, 2-stroke engine, 25 hp (471,246 units)
- IZh Jupiter-3-02 (1979–1981) – 347 cc, 2-cylinder, 2-stroke engine (254,316 units)
- IZh Planeta-3-02 (1981–1985) – 346 cc, 1-cylinder, 2-stroke engine (216,101 units)
- IZh Jupiter-4 (1981–1985) – 347 cc, 2-cylinder, 2-stroke engine, 28 hp (1,038,678 units)
- IZh Planeta-4 (1983–) – 346 cc, 1-cylinder, 2-stroke engine, 20 hp (167,092 until 1986)
- IZh Jupiter-5 (1985–1988) – 347 cc, 2-cylinder, 2-stroke engine, 24 hp (213,179 until 1986)
- IZh Planeta-5 (1987–2008) – 346 c, 1-cylinder, 2-stroke engine, 22 hp
- IZh Jupiter-5-01 (1988–) – 347 cc, 2-cylinder, 2-stroke engine, 24 hp
- IZh Planeta-7 – 249 cc, 1-cylinder, 4-stroke engine, 20 hp
- IZh Springbok (1997–) – 249 cc, 1-cylinder, 4-stroke engine, 21 hp
- IZh Saigak – 249 cc, 1-cylinder, 4-stroke engine, 21 hp
- IZh Junkier (2001–) – 347.6 cc, 2-cylinder, 2-stroke engine, 24.5 hp, water-cooled
- IZh Kornet (2000 presentation) – 50 cc, 1-cylinder, 2-stroke engine

=== Sport models ===
- IZh-350S (1947) – 346 cc, 1-cylinder, 2-stroke engine, 10.5 hp
- IZh-50 (1951–) – sport (cross) version of IZh-49
- IZh-54A – sport (racing), 346 cc, 1-cylinder, 2-stroke engine, 20 hp
- IZh-58 – sport (initially IZh-Jupiter was planned under this designation)
- IZh-61K (1961) – sport (cross), 340 cc, 1-cylinder, 2-stroke engine, 25 hp
- IZh-62Sz (1962) – sport (racing), 346(?) cc, 2-cylinder, 2-stroke engine, 28 hp
- IZh-344A (1962) – sport (racing), 344 cc, 3-cylinder, W layout, 2-stroke engine, 36 hp
- IZh-64K/M (1967) – sport (cross/multi-purpose)
- IZh-M10 (1967) – sport
- IZh-M12 (1968) – sport, engine 227 or 339 or 351 cc, 1-cylinder, 2-stroke engine, 25 or 33 or 33 hp
- IZh-K11/M11 (1969) – sport (cross/multi-purpose), 346 cc, 1-cylinder, 2-stroke engine, 25 hp
- IZh-Sz11 (1970) – sport (racing), 347 cc, 2-cylinder, 2-stroke engine, 35 hp, 160 km/h
- IZh-K14/M14 – sport (cross/multi-purpose), 346 cc, 1-cylinder, 2-stroke engine, 28 hp
- IZh-Sz12 – sport (racing), 347 cc, 2-cylinder, 2-stroke engine, 40 hp

=== Prototypes ===
- IZh Saturn – prototype with a shell frame
- IZh Sirius – prototype with fuel injection
- IZh 555 (1960s) – prototype, 500 cc, 2-cylinder, 2-stroke engine
- IZh Orion (1980s) – prototype, 1-cylinder, 4-stroke engine
- IZh Marafon (1980s) – prototype, 1-cylinder, 4-stroke engine
- IZh Lider (1999)

== See also ==
- Lada Izhevsk
