= Kyiv Motorcycle Plant =

Ukrainian automotive manufacturer

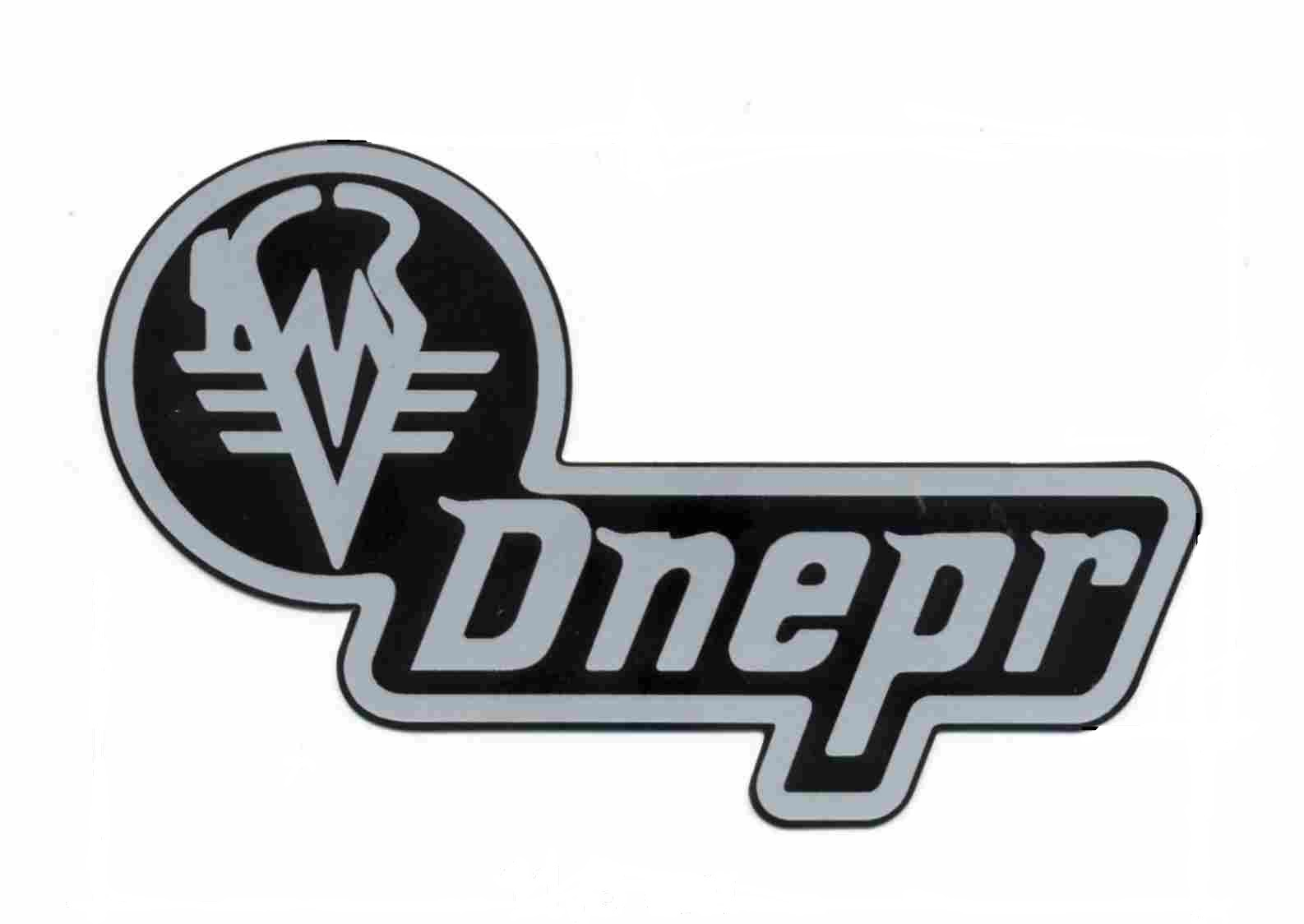
- Native name: Київський мотоциклетний завод
- Romanized name: Kyivskyi mototsykletnyi zavod
- Company type: Limited company
- Industry: Recreational vehicles
- Predecessor: Kyiv Armored Tank Plant No. 8
- Founded: September 1945; 80 years ago in Kyiv, Soviet Union
- Defunct: April 2016
- Fate: Bankruptcy
- Headquarters: Kyiv, Ukraine
- Products: Motorcycles
- Owner: Capital Index Group
- Website: www.kmz.com.ua

Kyiv Motorcycle Plant (Ukrainian: Київський мотоциклетний завод) or KMZ (Ukrainian: КМЗ) was an enterprise of the automotive industry of Ukraine, which produced motorcycles and, in small series, automotive equipment.

The plant had a mechanically assembled production of motor vehicles with a completed cycle and contained all the stages of manufacturing and assembling finished products, monitoring their quality, transporting at all stages of the production process, organizing and providing maintenance for jobs and sites, and technical preparation of production.

The last production of the plant was released in 2008, in August 2012 the production facilities of the plant were sold, on February 20, 2018, the last components and equipment were removed, and the plant finally ceased to exist.

== History ==
The Kyiv Motorcycle Factory was established in September 1945 on the basis of the former armored repair plant No. 8 in the Shevchenkivskyi district of Kyiv. From October 1945 to the end of March 1953 the plant was subordinated to the General Directorate of the Motorcycle and Bicycle Industry of the USSR (Glavmotovaloprom).

The first model of the K-1B motorcycle "Kievlyanin", was made according to the documentation and on equipment exported by repair from Germany in November 1946. It was a copy of the German motorcycle "Wanderer-1SP" with a 98cc "Sachs 98" engine. At the beginning of production, engines for the K1-B were received from Germany, but as early as 1947 the plant began serial production of motorcycles with an engine of its own production.

At the end of 1946, three-wheeled motorcycles for the disabled K-1B and a three-wheeled K1-G motorcycle began to be manufactured on the basis of motorcycle components. In 1949, about 100 specialists from the liquidated Gorky Motorcycle Plant arrived at the plant, and preparations began for the production of the military heavy-duty Dnepr M-72 motorcycle manufactured in Gorky.

== The products of the factory ==
Since 1956, the factory has developed and began to produce a new, more sophisticated model K -750 motorcycle with a side trailer ("cradle"). From 1955 to 1970 the output of motorcycles amounted to 45 to 50 thousand units annually.

In 1968, the launch of the K-650 motorcycle, the first model to be called the Dnipro.

Since 1972, the production of the MT-10 has been mastered with a new gearbox and reverse gear.

In 1977, the production of the Dnipro MT 10-36 motorcycle was started, since 1984 the Dnipro-16 model. In 1991, the first batch of single-engine motorcycles with an engine of 650 cc was produced at the Kyiv Motor Plant. see.
