= GMZ =

GMZ may refer to:

- Gorky Motorcycle Plant, a defunct Soviet manufacturing plant
- La Gomera Airport, in the Canary Islands
- Mgbo language
