= Minsk (motorcycle) =

Belarusian brand of motorcycles

Coordinates: 53°52′59″N 27°35′31″E

M1NSK

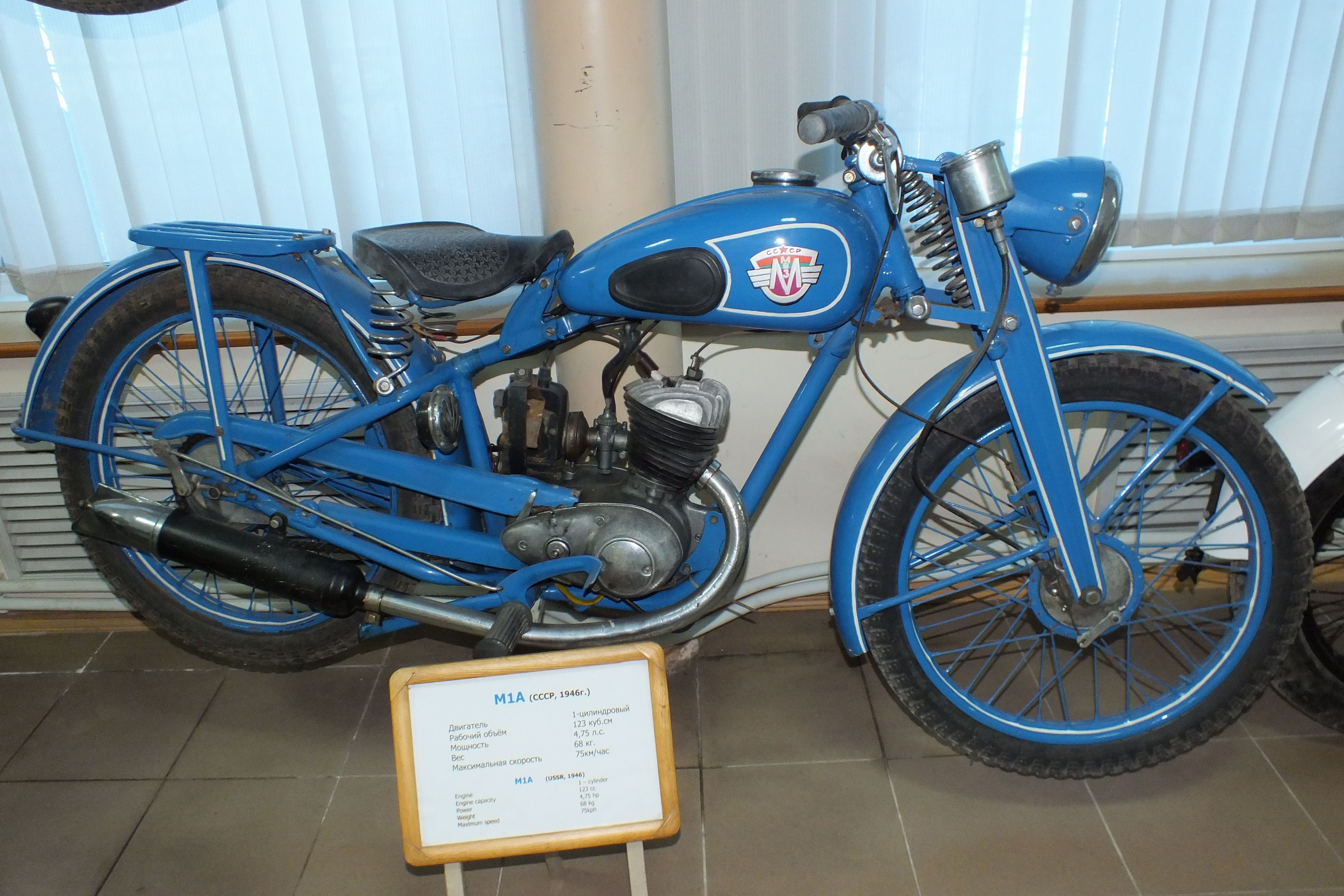
- Industry: Motorcycle manufacturing
- Founded: 1951
- Headquarters: Minsk, Belarus
- Products: Motorcycles; Scooters; ATVs; Snowmobiles
- Website: minsk-moto.by

Minsk (Russian: Минск), also known as M1NSK, is a Belarusian brand of motorcycles, scooters, ATVs and snowmobiles, produced by the Minsk Motorcycle and Bicycle Plant (MMVZ). The first M1A motorcycle was released in 1951. Since 2007, the company is a private enterprise. More than 6.5 million Minsk motorcycles have been sold worldwide.

M1NSK also builds bicycles branded as Aist.

== History ==
After World War II the documentation and equipment of the German DKW factory in Zschopau were taken to the Soviet Union as war reparations. Production of the RT 125 model began in Moscow under the M1A brand. By the Order No.494 of the Ministry of automotive industry of the Soviet Union dated 12 July 1951 the production of M1A was transferred from Moscow to the Minsk Motorcycle and Bicycle Plant (MMVZ, then Motovelo). This model was imported into the United Kingdom by Neval Motorcycles, marketed as Neval.

The new models code name system was introduced in 1973 with the new Minsk MMVZ-3.111.

Reliability and simplicity made Minsk motorcycles a cult brand in Vietnam, which was the most extensive export market. Minsk motorcycles were among the Soviet motorcycles that were distributed by SATRA, UK, under the Minsk Saturn 125 and Cossack brand names from 1973 to 1979.

In 2007 Motovelo became a private company. Motorcycles sold under M1NSK brand are rebadged Chinese products. For example, M1nsk TRX 300i is a Zongshen RX3.

== Gallery ==
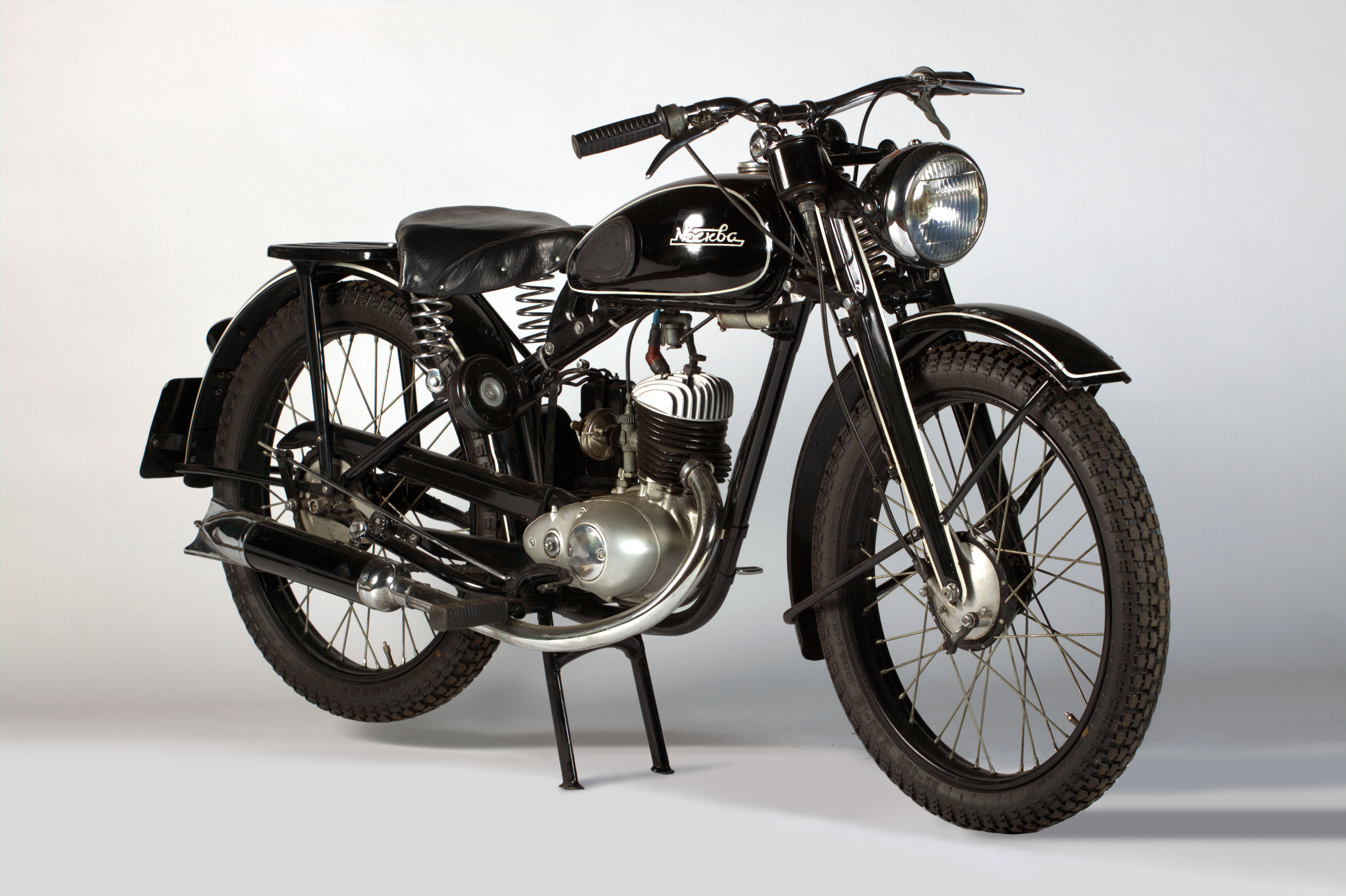
1951 M1A Moskva

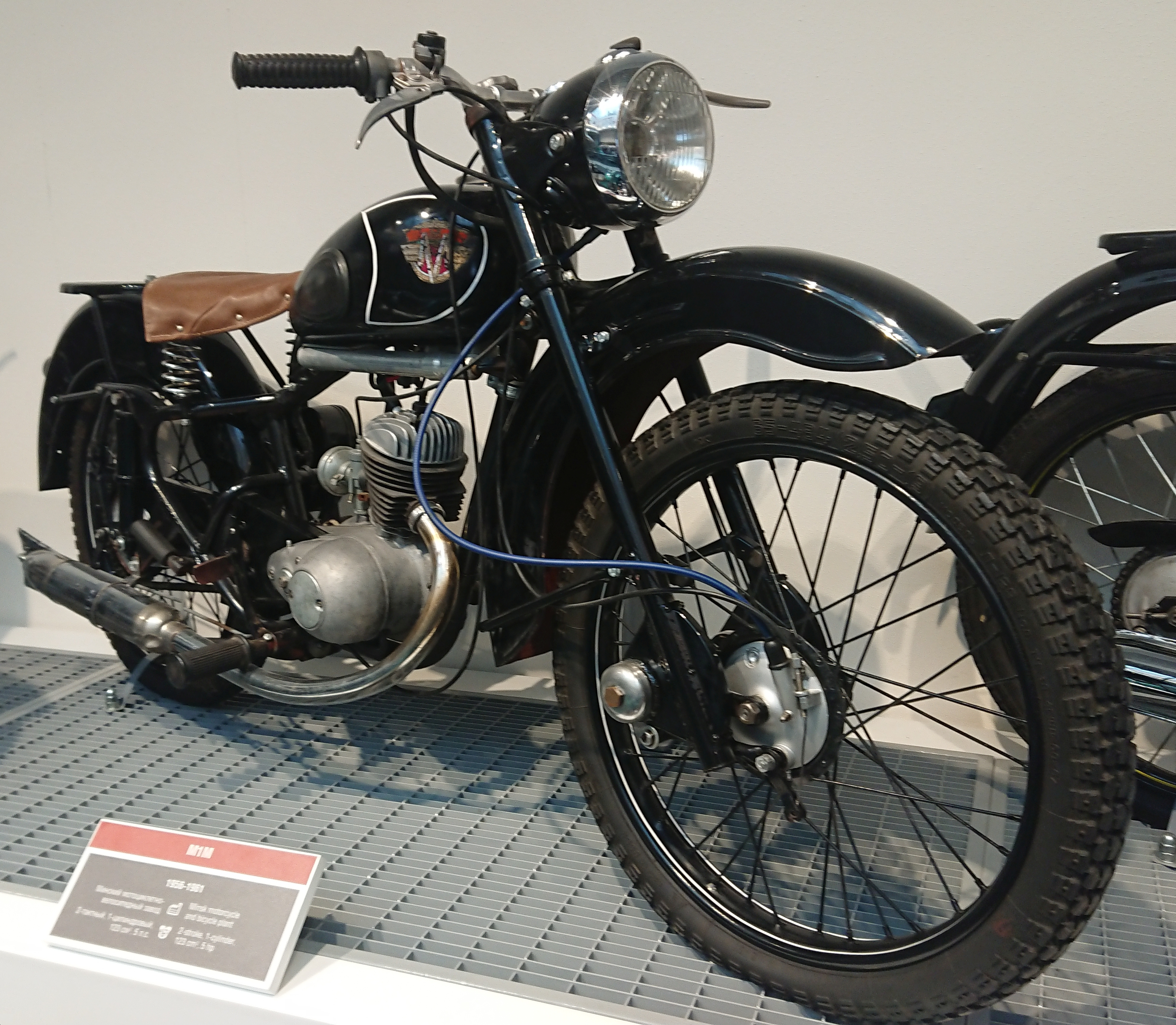
1956 M1M Minsk

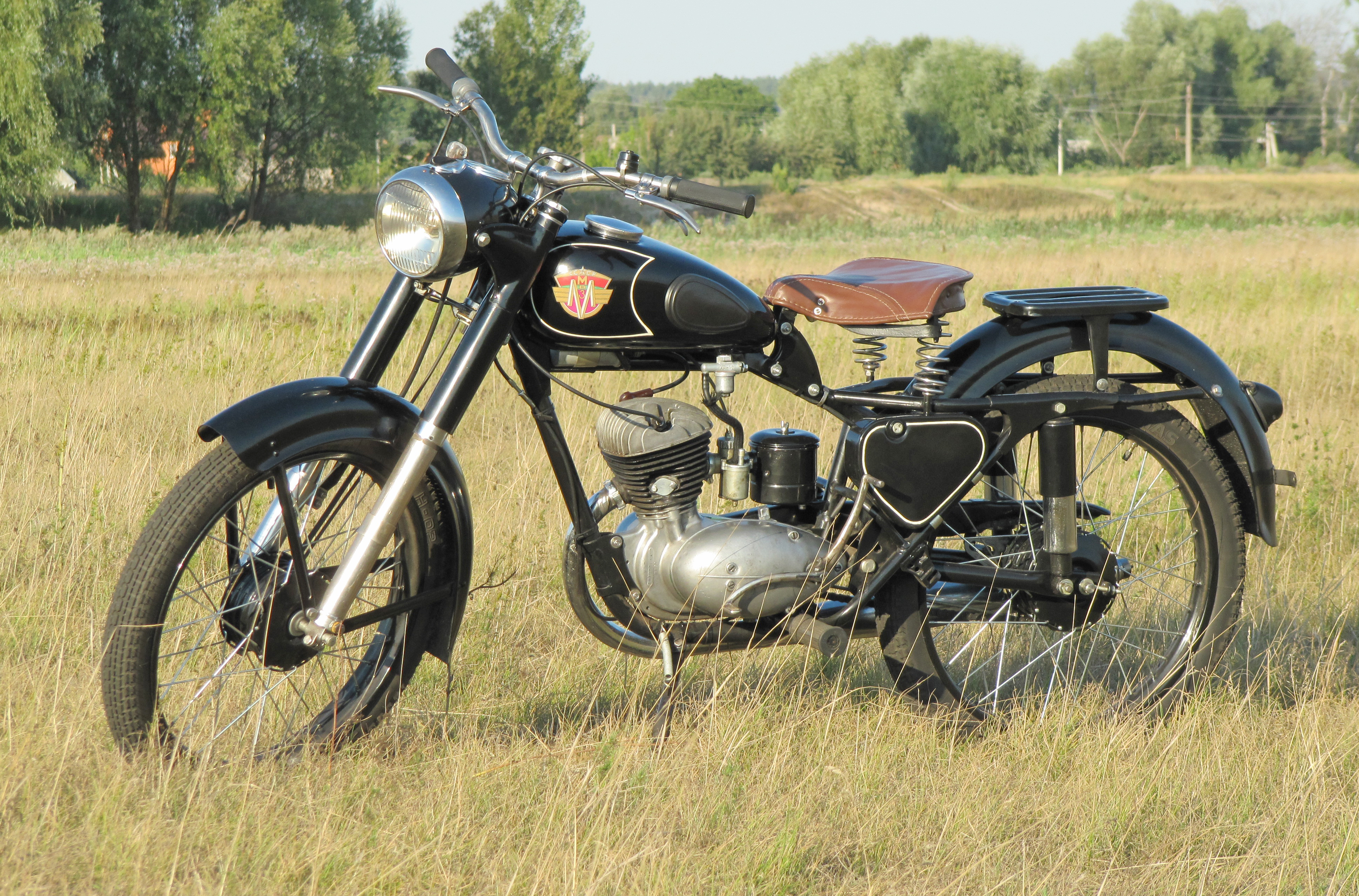
M103 Minsk (1962-1964)

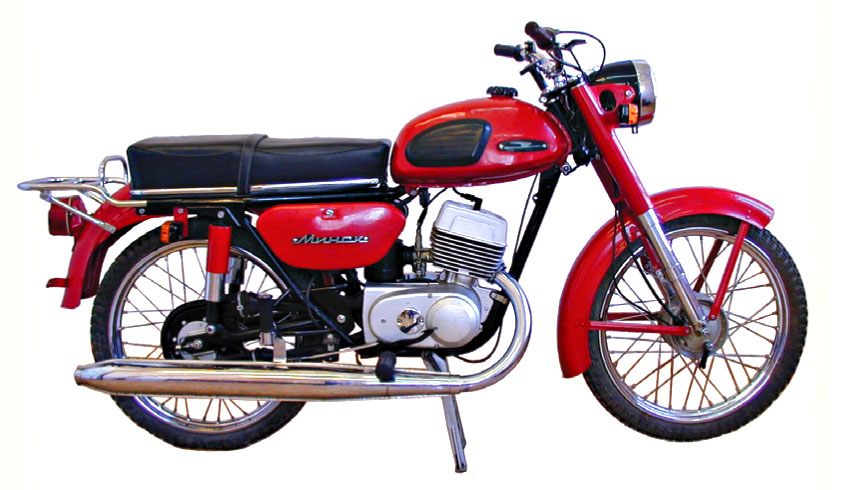
Minsk MMVZ-3.111 (1973-1976)

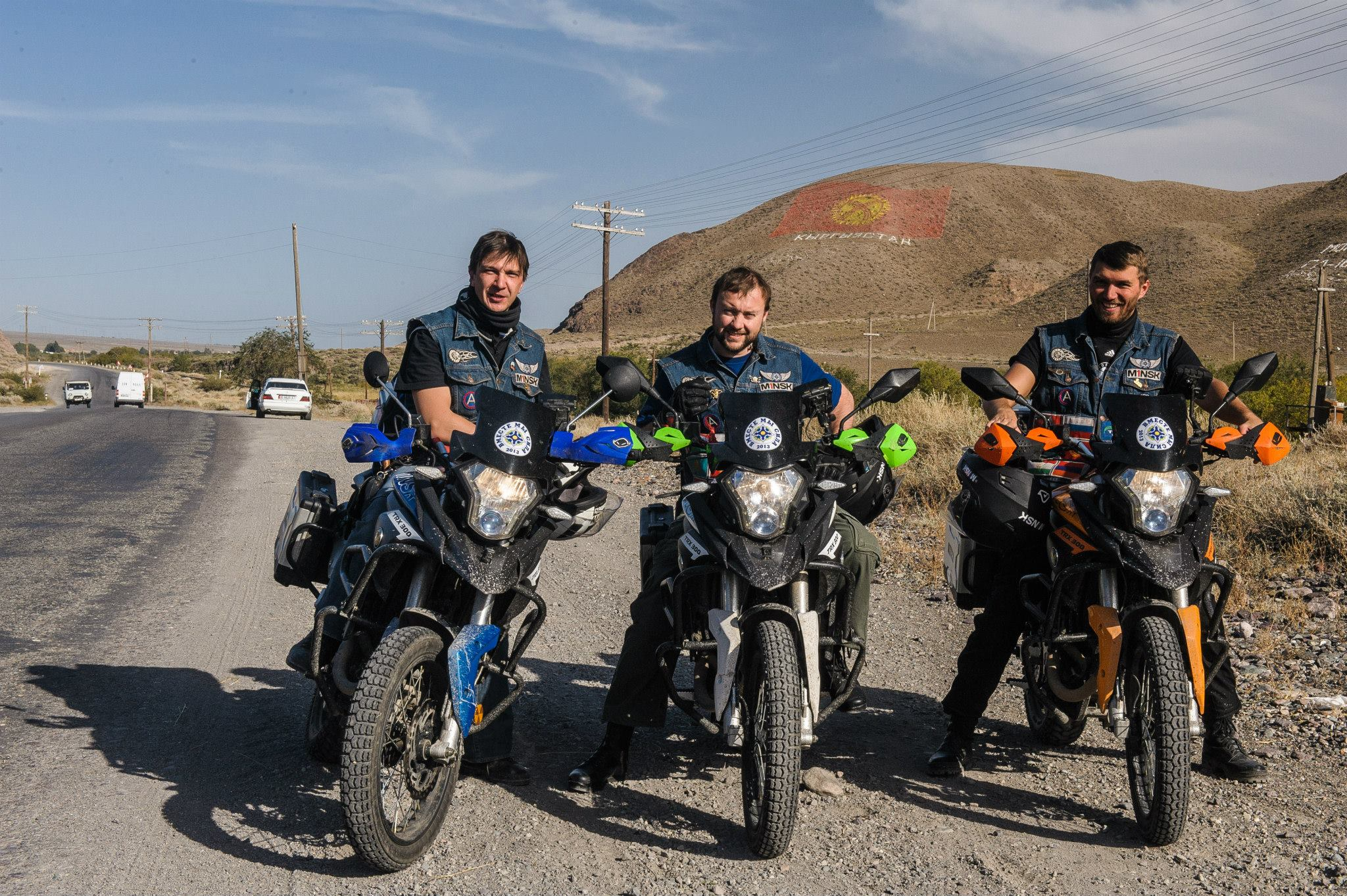
Three M1NSK TRX 300 at Brest-Dushanbe rally

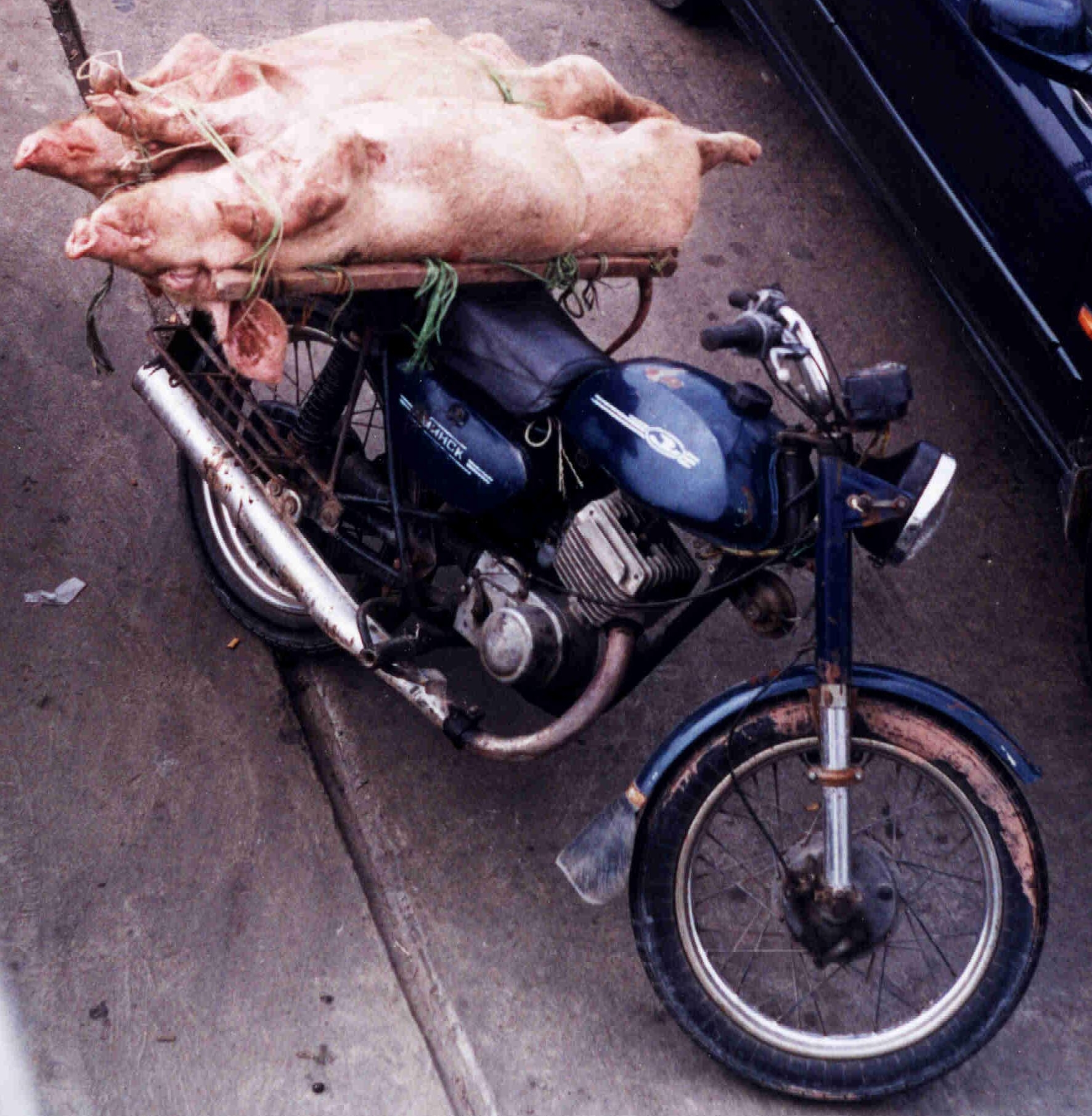
Minsk bike in Vietnam

== See also ==
- Other motorcycles originated in the Soviet era: Ural, Dnepr, Voskhod, IZh
