= NATI (motorcycle) =

NATI (Russian: Научный автотракторный институт, romanized: Nauchnyj avtotraktornyj institut) was a manufacturer of motorcycles in the Soviet Union from 1931 -1933. It built the NATI-A-750, designed by Soviet engineer Pyotr Mozharov, prior to the transfer of manufacturing to Podolsk Mechanical Plant, Podolsk (Moscow Oblast).

== History ==
The date of foundation of the company is considered to be December 31, 1925.

== Operation ==
- Research and development of promising tractor designs with high technical, economic, ergonomic and environmental characteristics.
- Creation of standard designs of new promising tractor units, assemblies and systems that ensure an increase in the technical level and technical and economic characteristics of machines.
- Industry-wide work on standardization and certification of tractor equipment.

The institute has experimental equipment, automated stands, climate chambers, and has a qualified team of researchers and testers.
