= Two-wheel drive =

Type of drivetrain with two driven wheels

Two-wheel drive (2WD) denotes vehicles with a powertrain that allows two wheels to be driven and receive power and torque from the engine. Also called all-wheel drive for motorcycles without sidecars.

== Four-wheeled vehicles ==
For four-wheeled vehicles (and by extension vehicles with more wheels) are referred to as either front-, or rear-wheel drive. The term 4×2 is also used, to denote four total wheels with two being driven. Most road vehicles use 2WD layout due to its lower cost and weight, higher gas mileage and simplicity, and its traction on roads under normal conditions being sufficient with only two wheels.

For vehicles that have four-wheel drive (4×4) the term 4×2 refers to the mode when 4×4 is deactivated and power is applied to only two wheels.

== Two-wheeled vehicles (and above) ==
A two-wheel-drive bicycle with the front wheel propelled by the arms and the rear wheel by the legs (demonstrated by its Dutch inventor on Polygoon, 1942)

For two-wheeled vehicles such as motorcycles and bicycles, the term is used to describe vehicles that can power the front as well as the back wheel. The term 2×2 is also used to denote two total wheels with both being driven. 2×2 vehicles are typically either mechanically driven, via a chain, belt, or shaft, or are hydraulic-driven. This scheme greatly improves off-road performance, but is quite complicated and requires more power to operate, thus most 2WD machines are either "exotic" bikes for enthusiasts or created with special uses in mind.

Manufacturers who have one in production include Rokon, Jeep, Tarus and Christini. Manufacturers who are working or have worked on a prototype include ZID, Suzuki, Yamaha, KTM, Honda, and Nissan.

== Two-wheel-drive with sidecars ==
For three-wheeled vehicles such as motorcycles with sidecars, the term is used to describe vehicles that can power the sidecar as well as the back wheel. Sidecar-drive vehicles are typically mechanically driven via a shaft and may or may not have a differential. This scheme greatly improves off-road performance, but is more complicated and requires more power to operate, thus most 2WD machines are vehicles created with special uses in mind such as trials or military use. The first use of the sidecar drive appears in 1928 with the apparent independent invention of Baughan in the UK, and Mokharov in the USSR.

== See also ==
- Individual wheel drive
