= Delfast =

US-headquartered Ukrainian electric bicycle manufacturer

- Company type: private company
- Industry: electric vehicles
- Founded: 2014 in Kyiv, Ukraine
- Founder: Daniel Tonkopi
- Website: delfastbikes.com

Delfast is a US-headquartered Ukrainian electric bicycle manufacturer. Their website shut down in December 2024.

== History ==
Delfast has been operating in Ukraine since 2014 as a bicycle couriers service for online orders in Kyiv. It aimed to provide an eco-friendly service but wanted more than the quality and performance of electric bicycles available on the market. It had to develop an e-bike of its own. In 2017, the company launched the production with $150,000 in crowdfunding raised on Kickstarter.

Due to surprisingly high demand for its e-bikes, Delfast turned a side-project into a business. By 2019, the company had developed several successful electric bicycles and got up to 20,000 pre-orders. Delfast closely cooperated with the Kyiv Polytechnic Institute on R&D. In April 2020, it received a European Bank for Reconstruction and Development “Climate Innovation Vouchers” grant, which allowed it to certify the e-bikes for the EU market. The company established a US office in Los Angeles, transferred the manufacturing from China to Ukraine, and raised $3.4 million in funding for its R&D center in Ukraine

Most of the Delfast e-bikes are purchased in the US, EU, Canada, Mexico. The company also produces e-bikes for delivery companies, such as Glovo. During the Russian invasion of Ukraine in 2022, modified Delfast e-bikes were widely used by the Ukrainian military as stealthy NLAW carriers in raids on Russian armored vehicles.

== Products ==
Delfast's first model Delfast Partner was developed specifically for bike couriers with 100 km battery life and some professional features. The company's second model, Delfast Prime, won the Guinness Book of World Records for the greatest distance traveled on an electric motorbike on a single charge (370 km). Delfast Top and Delfast Offroad are the consumer models in fatbike form factor. Modified Delfast Top e-bikes were supplied to police departments in Mexico and the US. In 2020, the company introduced Delfast Trike, a 3-wheel freight e-bike developed under the USAID grant for the Nova Poshta.

In November 2021, Delfast re-imagined an iconic Dnepr motorcycle as an e-bike. The 2022 Delfast Top 3.0 model, introduced at CES won Forbes' fastest e-bike of the year. Later in 2022, Delfast started an Indiegogo campaign for its new daily commute Delfast California bike, which featured a 750W motor, a U-shaped frame, and a companion app.
