= Podolsk Mechanical Plant =

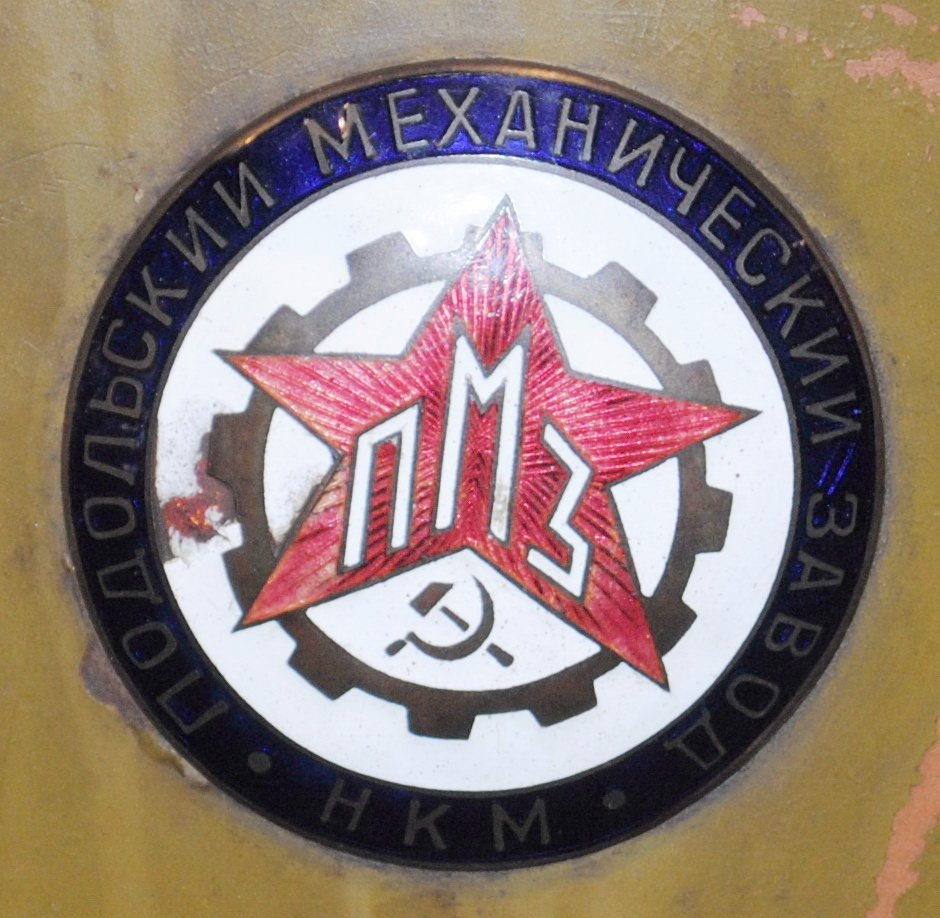
Podolsk Mechanical Plant logo

Podolsk Mechanical Plant (PMZ; Russian: Подольский механический завод, romanized: Podol'skiy Mekhanicheskiy Zavod) was a mechanical plant in Podolsk, Russia.

== History ==
The Podolsk factory was established in 1900 as Kompaniya Singer, the Russian branch of the Singer Corporation. It was the sole sewing machine factory in the Russian Empire, and by 1914 it employed over 5,000 workers.

The company was nationalized after the Russian Revolution, and it was renamed Zavod imeni Kalinina to commemorate a visit to the factory by Mikhail Kalinin.

The first motorcycles were built in the factory in February 1934. In 1935 they commenced series production of the PMZ-A-750 which had been design by Pyotr Mozharov at NATI, for the Soviet Army.

The factory was partially evacuated in Autumn 1941. In 1942, the plant was re-established as an ammunition manufacturing site. The production of sewing machines resumed in late 1945.

The company became Kontsern Podolsk in 1990 and was privatized in 1991. In August 1994 a controlling stake in the plant was sold to Semi-Tech. After the takeover by the Canadian company, thousands were fired, and the workforce dropped from 18,000 to 2,000 workers.

The factory was broken up into three entities: ZAO "Industrial Sewing Machines Plant", CJSC "Domestic Sewing Machines Plant" and CJSC "Foundry". By late 2003, the Industrial Sewing Machines Plant was practically liquidated and merged with the Domestic Sewing Machines Plant.
