= PMZ-A-750 =

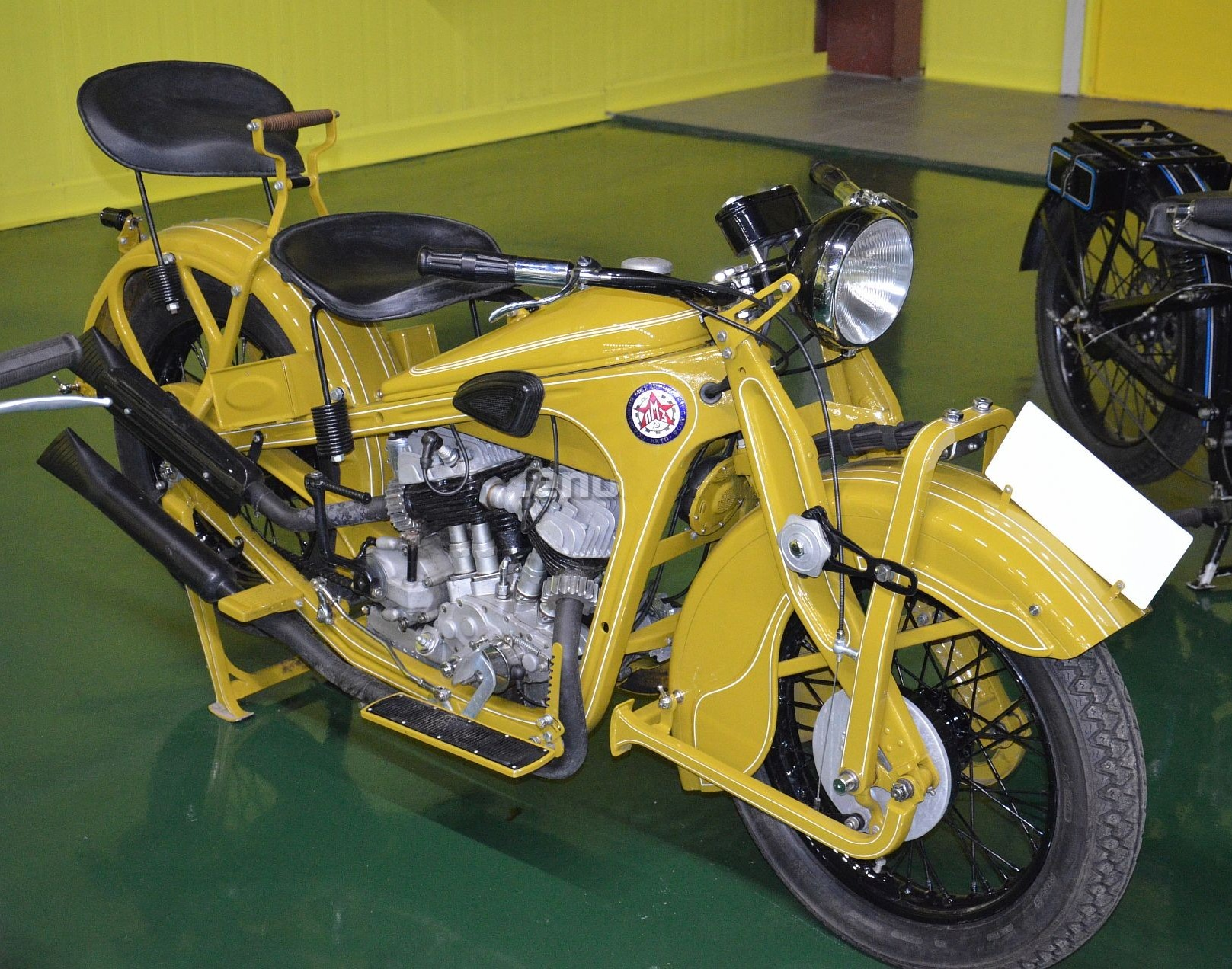
- Manufacturer: PMZ
- Production: 1934–1938
- Assembly: Podolsk
- Engine: 746 cc (45.5 cu in), four-stroke V-twin
- Bore / stroke: 70 mm × 97 mm (2.8 in × 3.8 in)
- Compression ratio: 5.0
- Top speed: 95 km/h
- Power: 15 hp (11 kW) at 3600 rpm
- Ignition type: Electrical (6 V battery)
- Transmission: Multiple-plate, dry, 3-speed manual
- Suspension: Spring, 8 plates with damper (front), rigid (rear)
- Brakes: Drum type
- Tires: 4x19 in
- Wheelbase: 1395 mm
- Dimensions: L: 2085 mm W: 890 mm H: 950 mm
- Seat height: 820 mm
- Weight: 206 kg (dry)
- Fuel capacity: 18 L

The PMZ-A-750 (Russian: ПМЗ-А-750) is a heavy motorcycle that was made in the USSR in the 1930s by Podol'skiy Mekhanicheskiy Zavod ("Podolsk Mechanical Plant", or PMZ). It is the first heavy motorcycle to have been manufactured in the USSR.

== History ==
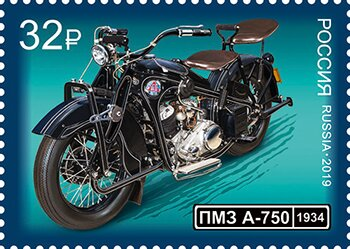
2019 Russian postage stamp commemorating the PMZ-A-750

The NATI (Scientific Auto & Tractor Institute) in Moscow designed the PMZ-A-750 at the request of the Supreme Soviet of the National Economy. A main designer was Pyotr Mozharov, who had been responsible for early IZh motorcycle prototypes, and practised in the German BMW works. The design used a flathead V-twin engine like a Harley-Davidson; a pressed steel frame like the BMW R12 and R17; and an unusual trailing link front fork. The new motorcycle was at first designated NATI-A-750.

At first, it was planned to produce the motorcycle in IZh works in Izhevsk. The first four were built there, and completed by 1 May 1933 (International Workers' Day). After trials, the Soviet Heavy Industry Ministry decided to start production at PMZ in Podolsk, which had not made motorcycles before. The model was accordingly redesginated PMZ-A-750, and by July 1934, the first nine motorcycles were built there. Production continued until 1938 or 1939, and a total of about 4,600 were built.

These motorcycles were used by the Red Army as well as civilian users, in both solo and sidecar combination versions.
