= Chang Jiang (motorcycle) =

Motorcycle manufacturer

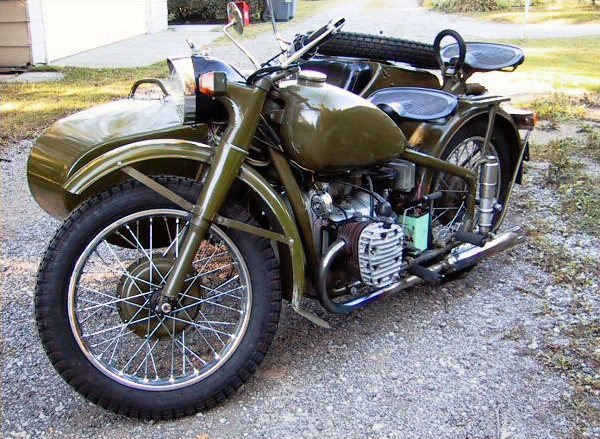
Chang Jiang CJ750 M1M

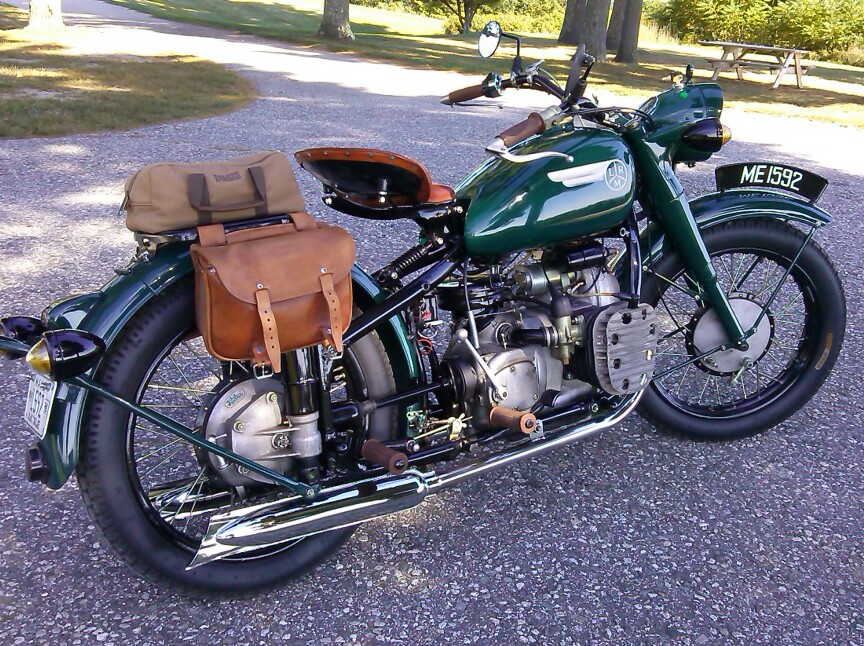
CJ 750 M1. Mark II sidevalve engine.

Chang Jiang (simplified Chinese: 长江; traditional Chinese: 長江; pinyin: Cháng Jiāng) is the transcribed brand name of motorcycles that were once manufactured by the China Nanchang Aircraft Manufacturing Company. It takes its name from the Chang Jiang River, also known as the Yangtze or, in English, the Long River.

== CJ750 ==
The CJ750 is based on the 1956 Soviet Irbitski Mototsikletniy Zavod (IMZ) M-72, which was derived from the earlier German 1938 BMW R71. Nearly all of them have sidecars.

Production began in the late 1950s or early 1960s. (Different sources cite different dates.) They were originally produced for the Chinese military and are powered by an air-cooled, four-stroke, opposed-twin engine displacing 746 cc (45.5 cu in). The rear wheel is shaft-driven.

The most common models are:

The M1 which has a sidevalve (flathead) engine and a 6-volt electrical system. This model is a clone of the M72 and closely resembles the 1938 BMW R71.

The M1M is also a sidevalve, however it uses a 12-volt electrical system and is equipped with a reverse gear. It also has an electric starter, where the M1 has only a kick-starter. These enhancements were designed with the help of German engineers.

The M1S (or "Super") uses an overhead-valve engine, 12-volt electrical system, electric starter and reverse gear. The OHV system is fundamentally of BMW design.

All three models use the same frame and sheet metal. The M1 and M1M are nearly identical in appearance, but they can be distinguished by observing certain details.

CJ technological history includes racing bikes, experimental engines and futile attempts at modernizing the appearance of a long obsolete machine. Beginning in the mid-1980s, over a decade after the normalization of relations between China and the USA, China opened its markets to foreign motorcycle manufacturers, which expedited the end of CJ750 mass production. Today, the marque is kept alive by interest from foreign hobbyists.

== History ==
The CJ750 originated with the 1938 BMW R71, then, by way of the Soviet IMZ M72, found its way to China as the Chang Jiang.

== Early production ==
In 1950, the People's Liberation Army Beijing No. 6 Automotive Works developed a military motorcycle by reverse engineering a German Zündapp KS 500 motorcycle. The Zündapp-based machine entered production in 1951. 4,248 were built before military motorcycle production was transferred to the Hongdu and Xingjiang machinery plants. Both factories remain subsidiaries of the state-run aeronautics industry to this day.

By the mid-1950s, the Soviets considered the M72 obsolete. China would soon acquire all the tooling and produce their own M72s. In light of this, the Zündapp-based machine was abandoned.

The Chinese M72 was named the Chang Jiang 750. According to some sources, it entered production in November 1957 at the state-owned Ganjiang machinery factory. Early production used M72 parts, and early CJs were nearly identical to M72s.

The Chang Jiang drivetrain has been revised several times since production began. From 1957 to 1966, CJs were equipped with so-called Type I engines and transmissions. This drivetrain was almost identical to those of the R71 and M72.

In September 1966, production of the Type II engine and gearbox began. It was not until 1972 that the Type II engine replaced the Type I in general use. Continued use of the Type I engine in 1966-72 was the result of a surplus of Type I components. With so many Type I engines in use, parts remained in production until the early seventies. When the military serviced Type I bikes, they would replace the engines and/or gearboxes with Type II components. This was done for ease of maintenance, parts availability, and improved engine characteristics. Bikes with Type I engines often had their original gearboxes replaced with a Type II. Engines manufactured with a serial number of 661802 and higher are Type II.

In the 1960s, the factory was renamed the State-Owned Changjiang Machinery Factory.

In 1969, the CJ750 underwent some minor design changes, primarily related to sidecar frames and headlight-mounted switches. Gas tanks with built-in tool boxes appeared around this time.

In the late-1970s, the factory was merged with airplane manufacturer Guo Ying Hongdu Ji Xie Chang. At this time, an OHV engine producing 30 hp (22 kW; 30 PS), with a six-volt electrical system, was being developed. Only a few of these engines can be found today. They were quickly replaced by a 32 hp (24 kW; 32 PS) version with a twelve-volt electrical system.

In December, 1980, a small number of 900 cc (55 cu in) OHV engines were produced in response to the acquisition of BMW motorcycles by the armed police. Only a handful of these machines were built, probably less than ten. Only a few 900 cc (55 cu in) engines have been found.

== Modern production ==
The 750 OHV upgrade appeared in the mid-eighties and entered production at the Ministry of Aviation and Space Engine Factory in Nanchang, Hunan Province. This marked the introduction of the M1S model.

In 1986, the M1 model was upgraded with a 12V electrical system and a gearbox with reverse, and designated the M1M.

== See also ==
- Sidecars
