= Neval (motorcycle) =

Neval Motorcycles imported into Great Britain by Neville Mason in Hull a two stroke 125cc motorcycle based on a pre-World War II DKW RT 125 design made in Minsk in the former Soviet Union (now Belarus) by Motovelo. This model was initially trademarked as "Neval". The dealership was based in De Grey Street in Hull, East Yorkshire. They then moved to Beverley road in Hull.
