= Voskhod motorcycle =

Historical motorcycle manufacturer

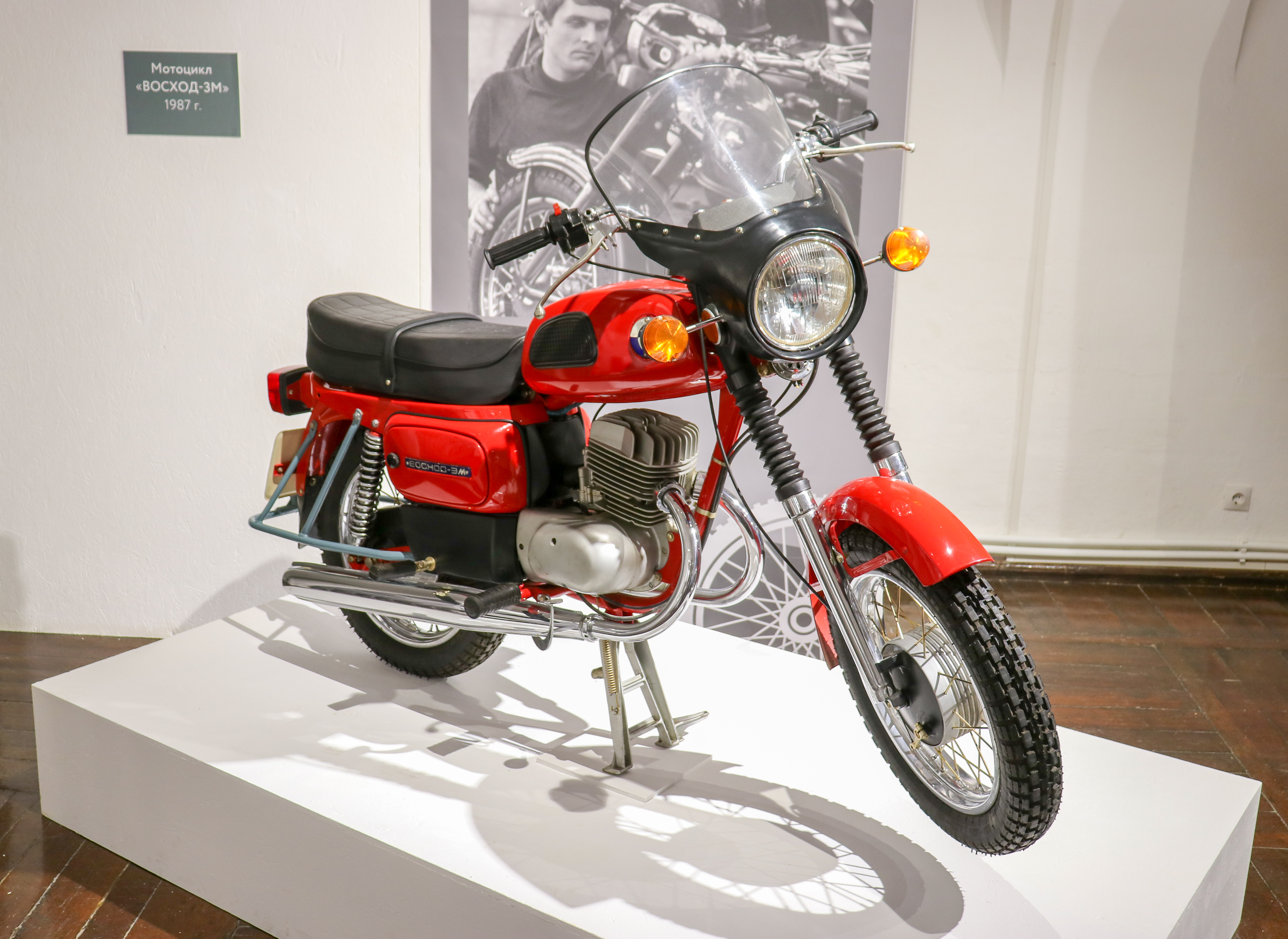
Voskhod 3M

Voskhod (Russian: Восхо́д, lit. 'Sunrise') is the name of several types of motorcycles produced at the Degtyaryov Plant in the Russian town of Kovrov since 1965.

All Voskhod motorcycles had a single-cylinder two-stroke engine with a displacement of 175 cc.

Between 1973 and 1979 Voskhod was one of the makes marketed by SATRA in the United Kingdom as Cossack motorcycles.

The Voskhod was introduced in 1957. For many this was a luxury model of the Minsk (125cc) K-55. In 1964 the Voskhod was made in a racing version.

== In popular culture ==
In Ken Follett's The Edge of Eternity – The Century Trilogy 3, this is the motorcycle owned by character Dmitri Dvorkijn (Dimka). Early on in the book, Dmitri rides it when he is saving his sister Tanja in 1961. The Voskhod is presented here as a motorcycle for the privileged.

== Sources ==
- инженер Л. Шугуров. Универсалы // журнал "Наука и жизнь", No. 3, 1982. стр.84-87
