= Aist Bicycles =

Belarusian bicycle company

Aist Bicycles Logo

Aist Bicycles (Russian: аист, literally "stork"), a subsidiary of Minsk Moto corporation, is a Belarusian bicycle company. Aist is the official partner of the Belarusian Federation of Cycling, and the Belarus National Cycling team.

== History ==
Aist Bicycles was founded in 1947, and in its first year sold about 6,000 bicycles. By 1950 it had sold 100,000 bicycles and by 1955 sales rose to 400,000 bikes a year. Aist began exporting bicycles in 1963 and by 1967 had sold about 8 million bicycles. In 1970 the logo was changed from the Cyrillic АИСТ to the English "AIST". In 1977 Aist developed a folding frame model with 20 inch wheels. The 1980 International Exhibition in Bombay (India) commended the design development of this bike. Aist produced its 16 millionth bicycle by 1983 and 50 millionth by 1997. With the fall of the Soviet Union, the company's fortunes declined and in the year 2002 it sold 840,000 bikes. However sales picked up later and by 2007 the company had sold more than 55 million bicycles.

== Export ==
Aist exports bicycles to Austria, Azerbaijan, Britain, Afghanistan, Belgium, Bulgaria, Hungary, Germany, Ghana, Greece, Georgia, India, Spain, Yemen, Cyprus, Kazakhstan, Kyrgyzstan, Latvia, Lithuania, Mali, Morocco, Mexico, Moldova, Nigeria, Poland, Portugal, Romania, Russia, Syria, USA, Tajikistan, Turkmenistan, Turkey, Uzbekistan, Ukraine, Finland, Sweden, Estonia, and Ethiopia.
