= Satra =

Defunct US international trading and metal processing company

- Industry: Import and distribution of Soviet Union products, metal processing
- Area served: United States, United Kingdom, Australia
- Products: Motorcycles, automobiles, tractors

Satra Corporation was a US trading and metal processing company. It is primarily known in the United Kingdom for its Satra Motors Limited subsidiary, which was the official importer and distributor of Soviet Union cars and motorcycles in that country from 1973 to 1979. Satra is an acronym for "Soviet American Trade Association".

== Subsidiaries ==
Satra Motors imported, modified, and distributed Soviet cars, such as Lada and Moskvich, and motorcycles made by Ural, Dnepr, Voskhod, Minsk, and the IZh whose Planeta and Jupiter were marketed. The motorcycles were sold in Britain and Australia under a single brand name, Cossack.

Satra Motors was based in Carnaby, Bridlington, East Riding of Yorkshire on the old airfield.

== Cossack motorcycles ==
Logo of Cossack

The term Cossack Motorcycle can apply to any number of motorcycles, made in the former Soviet Union, a reference to the horseback riding Cossacks. Some are derived from the design of the 1938 BMW R71 sidecar motorcycle. Examples include the Russian Ural or the Ukrainian Dnipro.

Cossack was also the brand name applied to all Soviet motorcycles distributed by Satra Belarus from 1973 to 1979, originally located in Surrey, southern England, later moving to Carnaby in eastern England and being used by the Australian importer, Capitol Motors until May 1976 when their motorcycle division closed.

Ural, Dnipro, IZh, Voskhod and Minsk were some of the former Soviet Union manufacturers whose bikes were imported and rebadged.

== General and cited references ==
- "Business Summary: Western pays 20.6 million pounds for Lada distribution", The Times, London: – via General OneFile (subscription required), October 24, 1987
- Kramer, David (July 23, 1985), "Soviet nickel embargo could be ending: Satra", American Metal Market, vol. 93, – via General OneFile (subscription required), p. 2
- Goldman, Marshall I. (1975), Détente and Dollars: Doing Business with the Soviets, Basic Books, pp. 139, 190, 304, ISBN 978-0465016129, archived from the original on 2016-03-09 – via Questia
- Levinson, Charles (2013), International Trade Unionism, Routledge, p. 163, ISBN 9781134460694
- "New firm to advance Soviet aerospace exports/joint ventures", Defense Daily, Access Intelligence, December 4, 1990, archived from the original on June 29, 2014 – via HighBeam Research
- "Selling the Lada", New York, p. 13, October 13, 1980, ISSN 0028-7369
