= Kenneth Zeichner =

American professor of education

Kenneth M. Zeichner is Boeing Professor of Teacher Education and was the Director of Teacher Education from 2009 to 2013 at the University of Washington. He was the Hoefs-Bascom Professor of Teacher Education and Associate Dean for Teacher Education, University of Wisconsin–Madison. He received his Ph.D. in 1976 from Syracuse University in educational psychology and has been on the faculty at Madison since that time. He has had visiting appointments at Umeå University (Sweden), Simon Fraser University (Canada), and the University of Southern California.

Zeichner serviced as Vice President of American Educational Research Association (Division K), a member of the Board of Directors of the American Association of Colleges for Teacher Education, co-chair of the AERA Panel on Research in Teacher Education and as a member of National Academy of Education Committees on Teacher Education and Teacher Professional Development. He is an elected member of the National Academy of Education and a Fellow of the American Educational Research Association. His book Studying Teacher Education: The Report of the AERA Panel on Research and Teacher Education won the American Association of Colleges for Teacher Education Outstanding Writing Award for 2006.

He received a Fulbright senior specialist grant in education at Charles Sturt University in Australia. He was awarded the American Association of Colleges for Teacher Education’s Margaret B. Lindsey Award for Distinguished Contributions to Research on Teacher Education in 2002; UW–Madison School of Education’s Distinguished Achievement Award in 2000; the National Staff Development Council’s Best Non-Dissertation Research Award in 1998; an Award for Excellence in Professional Writing from the American Association of Colleges for Teacher Education in 1993; the Association of Teacher Educators’ Distinguished Teacher Educator Award and its Distinguished Research Award in 1990; and was named Wisconsin Teacher Educator of the Year by the Wisconsin Department of Public Instruction.

Educating Teachers for Diversity Zeichner (1993) identifies 16 key elements of effective teacher education for diversity children.

In May 2018, Zeichner received an honorary doctorate of humane letters degree during the 164th commencement of Syracuse University.

== Books ==
- Zeichner, Kenneth M. Reflective teaching : an introduction / Kenneth M. Zeichner, Daniel P. Liston. Mahwah, N.J. : L. Erlbaum Associates, 1996. xix, 92 p.; 23 cm. ISBN 0-8058-8050-X (pbk. : alk. paper)
- Zeichner, Kenneth M. Studies of excellence in teacher education : preparation in the undergraduate years / Linda Darling-Hammond, editor. Washington, DC : AACTE Publications, c2000. xi, 109 p.; 22 cm. ISBN 0-9654535-6-1
- AERA Panel on Research and Teacher Education. Studying teacher education : the report of the AERA Panel on Research and Teacher Education / edited by Marilyn Cochran-Smith, Kenneth M. Zeichner. Mahwah, N.J. : Lawrence Erlbaum Associates, c2005. xii, 804 p. : ill.; 26 cm. ISBN 0-8058-5592-0 (case : alk. paper), ISBN 0-8058-5593-9 (pbk. : alk. paper)
