= Degtyaryov Plant =

Russian mechanical engineering company

Coordinates: 56.37°N 41.33°E

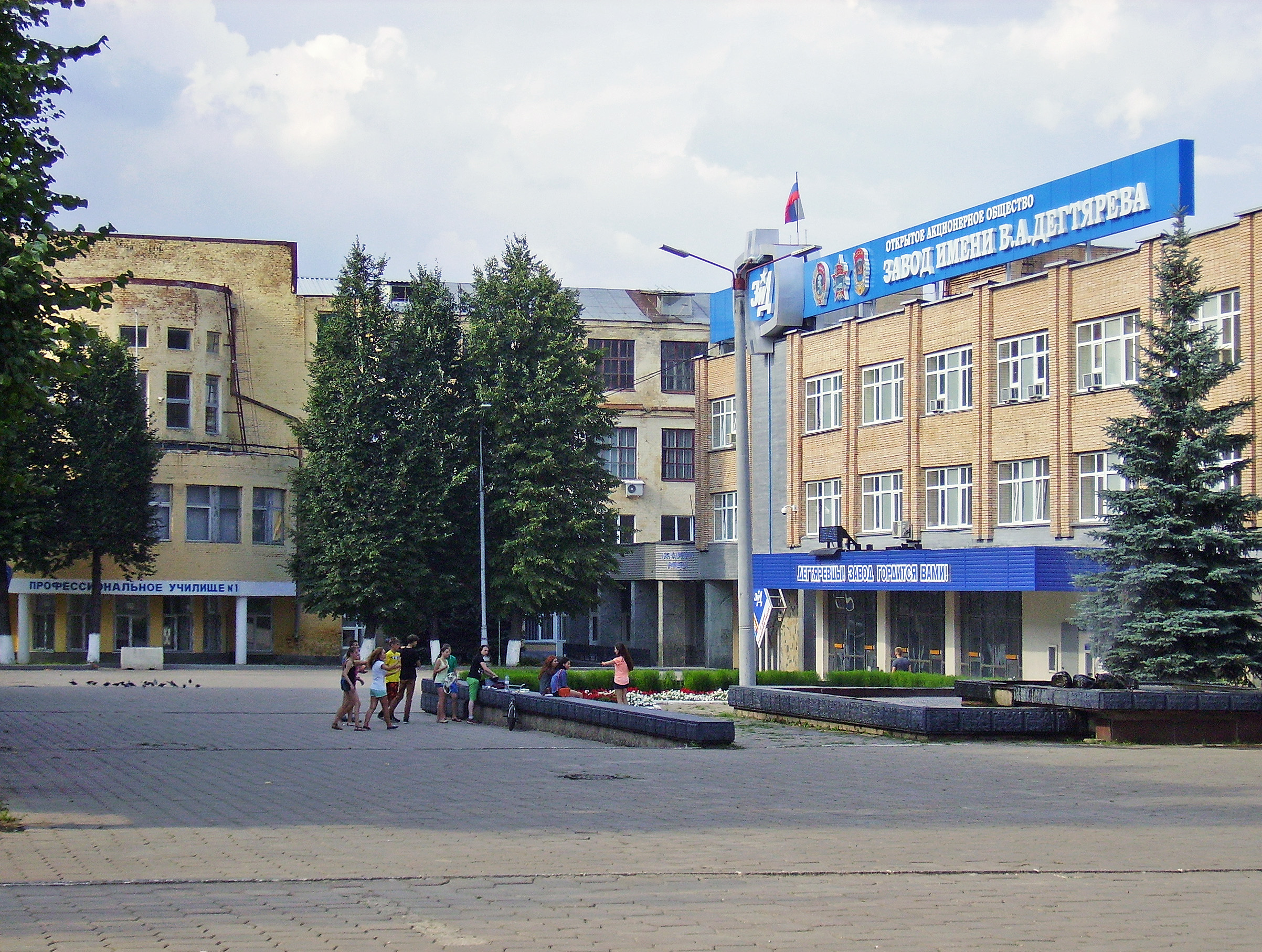
- Degtyaryov Plant's main entrance in Kovrov, VLA
- Native name: ОАО «Завод им. В. А. Дегтярёва»
- Romanized name: ZiD
- Company type: Open joint-stock company
- Industry: Mechanical engineering
- Founded: 27 August 1916; 109 years ago
- Headquarters: Kovrov, Vladimir Oblast, Russia
- Products: Firearms, Anti-tank rifles, Anti-tank guns, Aircraft cannons, Anti-aircraft cannons, Rocket-propelled grenades (RPG), ATGMs, MANPADS missiles, Grenade launchers, Motorcycles, Mopeds, Tractors, Batteries
- Brands: Voskhod
- Owners: GlobalVoenTreuing Ltd (49.88%); Research Institute "Signal" (24.9%)
- Parent: High Precision Systems (Rostec)
- Website: zid.ru

Degtyaryov Plant (Russian: ОАО Завод имени В. А. Дегтярёва, romanized: OAO Zavod imeni V. A. Degtyaryova, English: Open Joint Stock Company "V. A. Degtyaryov Plant") or ZiD (Zavod imeni Degtyaryova) is one of the most important weapon and vehicle producing enterprises of Russia. The company is named after Vasily Alekseyevich Degtyaryov (2 January 1880, Tula – 16 January 1949), a Soviet and Russian engineer who specialized in weapons design.

Degtyaryov Plant is a subsidiary of High Precision Systems (Rostec).

== History ==
Founded in Kovrov in 1916, the firearms plant has been supplying Russian and Soviet armed forces with weapons ever since. Weapons such as the Degtyaryov anti-tank rifle (PTRD-41), the Degtyaryov machine gun, the Shpagin submachine gun (PPSh-41) and the Goryunov heavy machine gun (SG-43 Goryunov) were created at the plant.

In 1989 it was the fourth largest motorcycle producer in the Soviet Union.

== Production ==
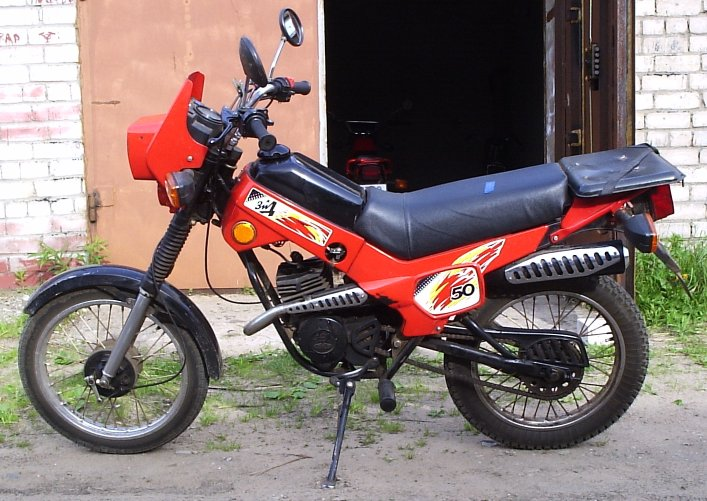
ZiD-50-Pilot moped

Presently the Degtyaryov Plant is producing revolvers, machine guns, aircraft guns, anti-aircraft guns, anti-tank guns and rocket systems.

=== Products ===
- KSVK 12.7 sniper rifle
- PTRD-41
- KPV heavy machine gun
- Kord machine gun
- RPD
- PKM
- PPSh-41
- PKP Pecheneg machine gun
- AEK rifle series
- AGS-30
- DP-64
- AEK-919K "Kashtan"
- RPG-7V2
- SP81 flare gun
- RGS-50M grenade launcher

The plant also makes a range of civilian products: motorcycles (i.e. Voskhod), mopeds, micro-tractors, sewing machines and accumulator batteries.

== Awards ==
- Order of the Red Banner of Labor (1942)
- Order of Lenin (1945)
- Order of October Revolution (1971)
