= Dnepr (motorcycle) =

Motorcycle brand produced in Ukraine since 1967

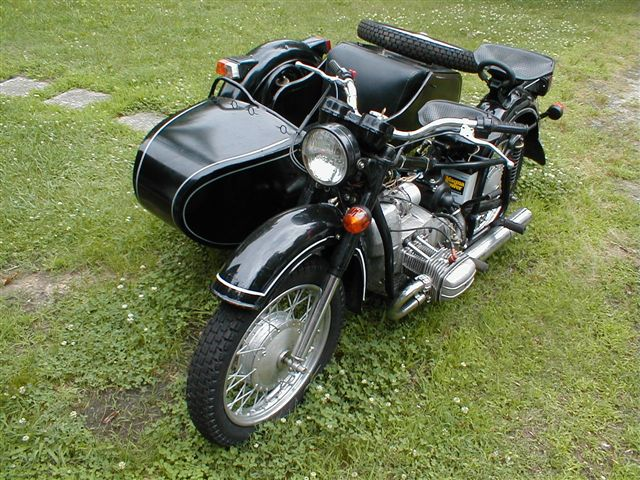
Dnepr MT-11 motorcycle outfit with fuel tank removed

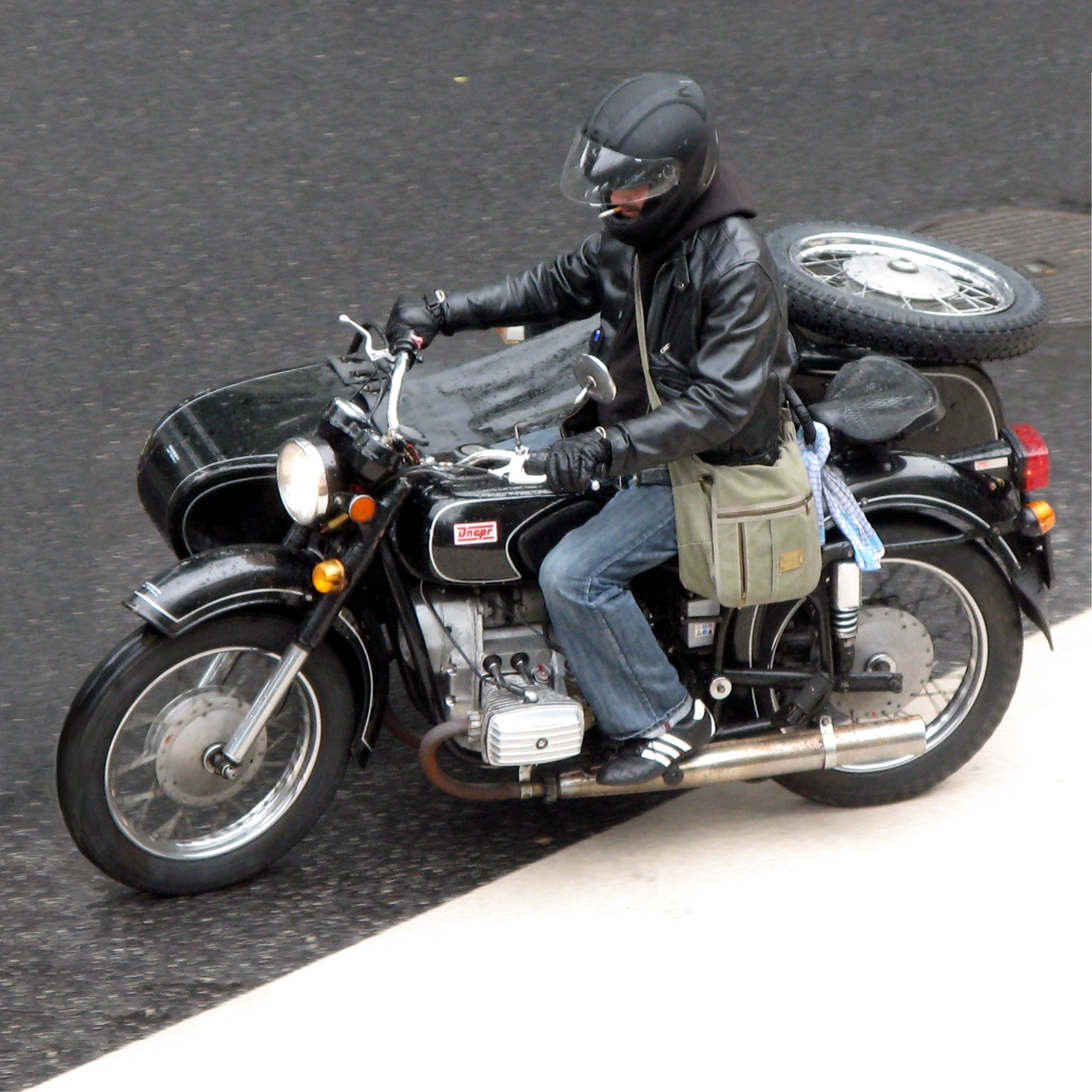
Dnepr MT-16 with sidecar wheel drive

Dnepr (Ukrainian: Дніпро Russian: Днепр) is a motorcycle brand produced in Kyiv, Ukraine. It has been in use since 1967.

Motorcycles have been produced in Kiev since 1946 at the Kyiv Motorcycle Plant (Kyivskyi Mototsykletnyi Zavod (KMZ), Київський Мотоциклетний Завод, (КМЗ)). Initial production was of a 98 cc two-stroke model that was confiscated from the German firm Wanderer as reparations. The original design for KMZ heavy motorcycles, and their cousin the IMZ, is taken from the pre-World War II German BMW motorcycle R71, which the Soviet Union licensed in 1940. The plant and equipment needed to make the M-72 (the Soviet derivative of the BMW R71) were transferred from the Gorky Motorcycle Plant (Gorkovskyi Mototsykletnyi Zavod, GMZ located in the city of Gorkiy (Nizhny Novgorod) in 1949. The first batch of M-72 motorcycles was produced in 1952 with the supply of 500 engines from IMZ. In 1958 KMZ replaced the plunger framed M72-N with the swingarm framed K-750. In 1964, KMZ introduced a military model, the MV-750 with a differential two-wheel drive to the sidecar wheel.

In 1967, to celebrate the 50th Anniversary of the Great October Socialist Revolution, KMZ released their first OHV engine in the "Dnepr" K-650. Unlike the earlier sidevalve engines with their roller bearing crankshafts, this engine featured a sleeve bearing crankshaft as found in the World War II Zündapp KS750. The K-650 was superseded by model MT-9 650 cc, which was available in both solo and sidecar models (often referred to as the best "Cossack") as it was reliable and featured a new transmission with reverse gear and an automatic declutching mechanism incorporated into the riders foot pedal. The MT-10 was the first Soviet motorcycle to feature 12 volt electrics.

The Dnepr is famous for its off-road capability. Armed services models equipped with sidecars had two-wheel drive and as much as 15 cm (5.9 in) of ground clearance. The present engine is a 650 cc OHV boxer twin. Current models are fitted with engines ranging from the factory standard 650 to 750 and 1,000 cc.

Between 1973 and 1979 Dnepr was one of the makes marketed by Satra in the United Kingdom as Cossack motorcycles.

Since the demise of the Soviet Union, the factory fell on hard times. Production decreased to only remnants of former glory. All shops were closed, and machine tools were taken out of the city limits.
