= Baughan =

British cyclecar and motorcycle manufacturer

- Company type: Private company
- Founded: 1920
- Defunct: 2003
- Fate: Purchased by Rondol Technology Ltd
- Successor: Rondol Technology
- Headquarters: Stroud, Gloucestershire, UK
- Key people: Henry P. "Harry" Baughan
- Products: Cyclecar and motorcycles

Baughan was a British cyclecar and motorcycle manufacturer in business from 1920 until 1936. Founded in 1920 in Harrow, Middlesex, from 1921 the company moved to Stroud, Gloucestershire. After motorcycle production finished the company continued in general engineering and plastics.

== H.P. Baughan ==
Henry P. "Harry" Baughan was a well-known motorcycle trialist and organiser of such in the 1920s, many of which were close to his childhood home of Stroud, Gloucestershire; although he himself at the time lived in Harrow, Middlesex whilst working as an aircraft engineer. From these sporting beginnings - at a time when making and experimenting with motorcycles was considered a normal, almost home-based art - Baughan began to make his own machines.

== Production ==
In the 1920s, he had made his own first four-wheel cyclecar, powered by an air-cooled JAP V twin. Asked by fellow competitors to make them a similar machine, he productionised it through use of a JAP or water-cooled Blackburne V-twin, of either 998 or 1097 cc. Drive was to the rear wheels through a Sturmey-Archer three-speed-and-reverse gearbox and chain final drive. The chassis had a wheelbase of 89 inches (2,300 mm) with suspension by quarter elliptic leaf springs all round. Lightweight two-seat open bodies were fitted. Car production finished in 1925, but new cars were still listed for sale up to 1929. It is not known how many cars were made, but at least one survives.

After his own success in motorcycle trials in the early 1930s, Baughan began to make a range of trial-optimised motorcycles until 1936. Although a production template existed, each machine was a bespoke per-customer fitment. Powered again using either Blackburne or mainly JAP V-twins, ranging in size from 250 to 500 cc, each used qd real-wheel. Production is believed to have been small.

As World War II approached, and with his own sporting success ad that of his machines fading, Baughan focused his skills on the production of aircraft parts.

== Post-World War II ==
Baughan Ltd continued to exist into the new millennium as a producer of plastics processing equipment. They manufactured a large range of equipment including single screw extruders and 2-roll mills, with much still in use today. The company was eventually acquired by the now defunct Rondol Technology Ltd, a Staffordshire-based manufacturer of polymer processing equipment.

== See also ==
- List of car manufacturers of the United Kingdom
