= Pyotr Mozharov =

Soviet engineer

Pyotr Vladimirovich Mozharov (1888 – 1934) was a Soviet engineer who is often referred to as the father of the Soviet Motorcycle Industry. He is most famous for his early work at IZH as well as the design of the NATI (PMZ)-A-750 motorcycle for the Red Army. Mokharov together with English designer Henry Baughan independently developed the concept of driving the sidecar wheel in 1928.
