= Gorky Motorcycle Plant =

Gorky Motorcycle Plant (Russian: Горьковский Мотоциклетный Завод, romanized: Gorkovskiy Mototsikletniy Zavod; GMZ) was a motorcycle manufacturer, based in Gorkiy (nowadays Nizhny Novgorod), existing from 1941 to 1949.

== History ==
Gorky Motorcycle Plant commenced operations as part of Red Etna factory in 1941 with the transfer of plant and equipment from Kharkov Motorcycle Plant (KhMZ) and Leningrad Motorcycle Plant (LMZ), in Gorkiy which was necessitated by the German armies threatening Kiev and Leningrad.

Production ceased in 1949 and all plant and equipment was transferred to KMZ (КМЗ) in Kiev. About 100 employees moved to Kyiv as well. "Red Etna" operates in Nizhny Novgorod to this day and produces parts for automobiles.
