= List of museums in Russia =

This is a list of museums in Russia. It includes details of museums within Crimean peninsula as Russia annexed the territory in 2014 and now administers it as two of its federal subjects, while no official transfer of property was agreed between Russia and Ukraine and Crimean peninsula is considered to be an integral part of that country under temporary occupation.

== By federal subject ==
=== Arkhangelsk Oblast ===
- Malye Korely: Open-air museum, featuring the traditional wooden architecture of the Arkhangelsk area.
- Solovetsky Monastery contains a historical and architectural museum.

=== Astrakhan Oblast ===
- Astrakhan Kremlin is a museum that exhibits the lifestyle of the Astrakhan military garrison and is part of the Astrakhan State United Historical-Architectural Museum-Reserve.

=== Buryatia ===
- Ulan-Ude Ethnographic Museum

=== Chelyabinsk Oblast ===
- White House, Kyshtym houses a museum with a choice array of mineral exhibits.

=== Chuvashia ===
- Alikovo District Literary and Local Lore Museum
- Chuvash National Museum: The largest repository of natural, historical, cultural and theological artefacts of the Chuvash people and other ethnic groups.

=== Crimea ===
- Aivazovsky National Art Gallery
- Feodosia Money Museum
- Livadia Palace: Former summer retreat of the last Russian tsar, Nicholas II, today houses a museum.
- Museum of Vera Mukhina is a historical and art museum in Feodosia, dedicated to the childhood, youth and artwork of sculptor Vera Ignatyevna Mukhina.
- Naval museum complex Balaklava is an underground submarine base in Balaklava, Crimea, converted into a naval museum.
- Simferopol Art Museum
- Vorontsov Palace (Alupka)
- White Dacha is the house that Anton Chekhov had built in Yalta and in which he wrote some of his greatest work. It is now a writer's house museum.

=== Kaliningrad Oblast ===
- Kaliningrad Amber Museum is devoted to housing and displaying amber artworks.

=== Kaluga Oblast ===
- Tsiolkovsky State Museum of the History of Cosmonautics

=== Karelia ===
- Kizhi Pogost

=== Kemerovo Oblast ===
- Tomskaya Pisanitsa Museum

=== Krasnoyarsk Krai ===
- Permafrost Museum, Igarka

=== Leningrad Oblast ===
- Gatchina Palace
- Mon Repos (Vyborg)
- Priory Palace
- Rozhdestveno Memorial Estate
- Vyborg Castle

=== Mordovia ===
- Mordovian Erzia Museum of Visual Arts

=== Moscow Oblast ===
- Abramtsevo Colony is a center for the Slavophile movement and artistic activity in the 19th century.
- Central Air Force Museum
- Gorki Leninskiye
- Joseph-Volokolamsk Monastery
- Kubinka Tank Museum
- Melikhovo is a writer's house museum in the former country estate of the Russian playwright and writer Anton Chekhov.
- Muranovo is a state museum dedicated to the life of Russian poet and diplomat Fyodor Tyutchev
- New Jerusalem Monastery
- Tchaikovsky House-Museum (Klin)
- Trinity Lavra of St. Sergius
- Ugresha Monastery

=== Nizhny Novgorod Oblast ===
- Pechersky Ascension Monastery

=== Novgorod Oblast ===
- Borovichi Museum
- Tyosovo Railway Museum

=== Novosibirsk Oblast ===
- Museum for Railway Technology Novosibirsk

=== Penza Oblast ===
- The Museum of One Painting named after G. V. Myasnikov
- Tarkhany

=== Perm Krai ===
- Khokhlovka Architectural and ethnographic museum
- Perm Museum of Contemporary Art
- Perm Regional Museum

=== Pskov Oblast ===
- Mikhaylovskoye Museum Reserve

=== Rostov Oblast ===
- Alferaki Palace, Museum of Local Lore and History
- Bataysk Museum of History
- Birth house of Anton Chekhov
- Chekhov Gymnasium: Literary Museum named after Anton Chekhov
- Chekhov Library
- Chekhov Shop
- Taganrog City Architectural Development Museum
- Taganrog military museum
- Taganrog Museum of Art

=== Ryazan Oblast ===
- Khan's Mosque

=== Samara Oblast ===
- AvtoVAZ Technical Museum

=== Saratov Oblast ===
- Radishchev Art Museum

=== Sverdlovsk Oblast ===
- Irbit State Motorcycle Museum: Museum containing an extensive collection of production, racing and prototype bikes from the IMZ-Ural Factory as well as many foreign models from a wide range of manufacturers. The collection is unique in its display of the development of the Russian heavy motorcycle.
- Irbit State Museum of Fine Art: Museum of Fine Art contains some important works including etchings by famous European artists.
- Nevyansk Icon Museum: Private museum of icons in Russia. More than 300 Nevyansk icons of the 18th to the 20th centuries are on display there.
- The Nizhny Tagil Museum of Regional History
- Ural State Mining University
- Sverdlovsk Regional Museum of Local Lore
- UMMC Museum of Military and Automotive Equipment

=== Tambov Oblast ===
- Ivanovka estate: Museum commemorating the life and works of the Russian composer Sergei Rachmaninoff

=== Tatarstan ===
- Kazan Kremlin

=== Tula Oblast ===
- Kulikovo Field: Museum dedicated to the Battle of Kulikovo took place on September 8, 1380.
- Polenovo: Museum Estate of Russian landscape painter Vasily Polenov.
- Yasnaya Polyana: Writer's house museum, the former home of the writer Leo Tolstoy.

=== Tyumen Oblast ===
- Governor's Mansion (Tobolsk, Russia)

=== Udmurtia ===
- Tchaikovsky Museum (Votkinsk)

=== Vladimir Oblast ===
- Cathedral of Saint Demetrius
- Cathedral of the Nativity in Suzdal
- Dormition Cathedral, Vladimir
- Golden Gate (Vladimir): Museum inside focuses on the history of the Mongol invasion of Russia in the 13th century.
- Monastery of Saint Euthymius
- Museum of Chocolate (Pokrov): Museum displays the entire history of chocolate for over 4,000 years and tells about the foundation of the Stollwerck factory launched in Pokrov in 1997.
- Suzdal Kremlin

=== Vladivostok ===
- Arsenyev Regional Museum
- Fort No.7
- Memorial S-56 Submarine
- Military and History Museum of the Pacific Fleet
- Museum of Archaeology and Ethnography
- Museum of Automotive Antiques
- Museum of the Institute of Sea Biology
- Nostalgia Art Gallery
- Paleo Village Museum
- Primorye State Picture Gallery
- Sukhanov's House Museum
- The Voroshilov Battery Museum
- Vladivostok Fortress Museum
- ZARYA Contemporary Art Museum
- Zoological Museum
- Multimedia Historical Park "Russia My History"

=== Volgograd Oblast ===
- Old Sarepta Museum of History and Ethnography

=== Vologda Oblast ===
- Ferapontov Monastery
- Kirillo-Belozersky Monastery
- Museum of Diplomatic Corps

=== Yaroslavl Oblast ===
- Myshkin National Ethnographic Museum: Known as the Mouse Museum for its collection of 2,000 mouse-related items from all over the globe.

== See also ==
- List of museums
- Tourism in Russia
- Culture of Russia
