= Azur Air =

Russian charter airline

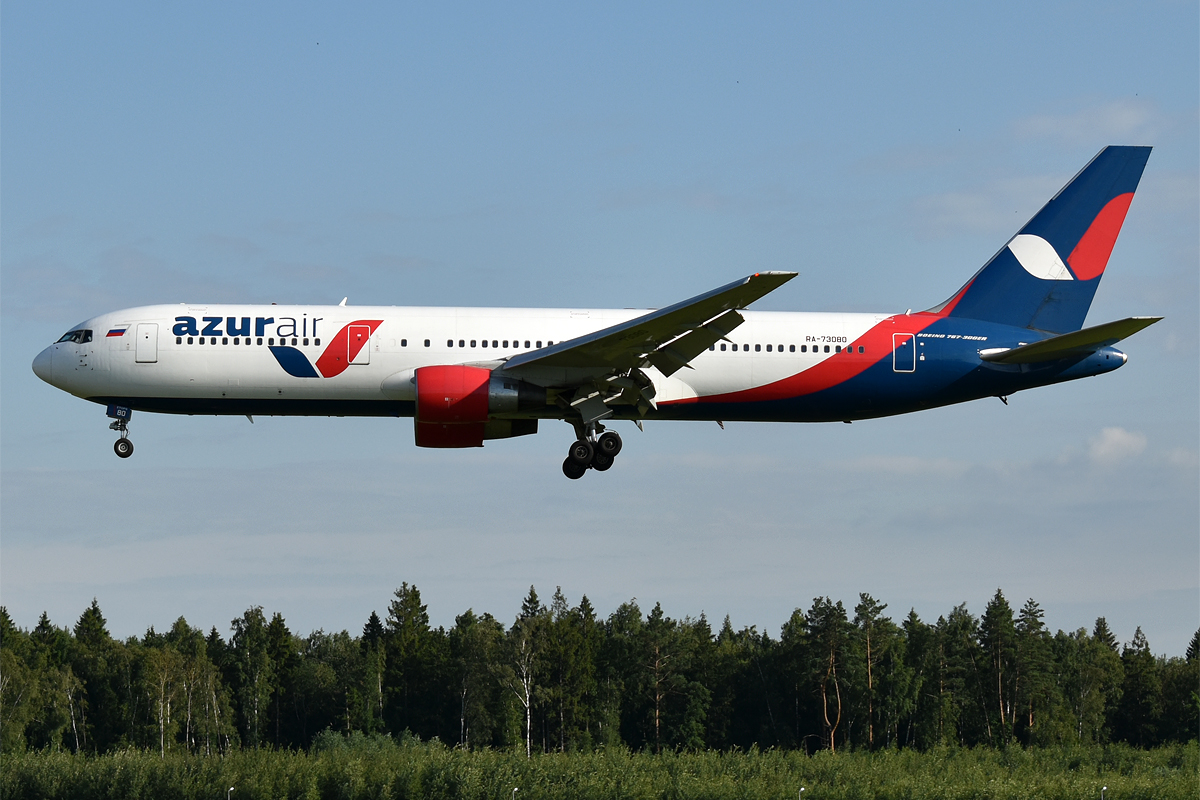
- Azur Air Boeing 767-300ER
IATA	ICAO	Call sign
ZF	AZV	AZUR AIR
- Founded: 1992; 34 years ago
- Hubs: Vnukovo International Airport
- Fleet size: 17
- Headquarters: Moscow, Russia
- Key people: Alexander Zosymov, General Director
- Website: azurair.ru

Azur Air (Russian: Азур Эйр), formerly Katekavia and stylised as azurair, is a charter airline and former regional airline in Russia. Initially it was based in Krasnoyarsk Cheremshanka Airport, the domestic airport serving Krasnoyarsk, and its destinations were all within Krasnoyarsk Krai. Nowadays, it mainly serves leisure destinations such as the route Moscow to Bodrum, offering an all-business class charter. It is currently on the list of airlines banned in the European Union.

On March 12, 2026, following an incident with an Azur Air Boeing 767-300ER departing from Nha Trang - Cam Ranh, Rosaviatsiya introduced restrictions on Azur Air's operating certificate until June 8, 2026, due to violations of aviation legislation requirements. The airline began cancelling flights after this decision, and may cease operating in June 2026 if the aforementioned violations are not addressed.

== History ==
=== Katekavia ===
The airline started operations in 1995 and operates regional flights out of Krasnoyarsk Cheremshanka Airport and Krasnoyarsk-Yemelyanovo Airport. The airline also operates charter services to Siberia and Yakutia. It carried around 122,000 passengers in 2009, and in 2010, started to acquire larger aircraft, mainly the Tupolev Tu-134. As of 3 April 2014, it had three Tupolev Tu-134s.

In April 2014, the airline commenced scheduled flights between larger Krasnoyarsk-Yemelyanovo Airport and further cities in Siberia: Surgut and Tomsk. The airline received international media and social media attention in 2014, when a video emerged of passengers on a scheduled flight from Igarka to Krasnoyarsk disembarking pre-departure to push their plane in temperatures of minus 52 degrees Celsius after its chassis froze.

=== Azur Air ===
In 2015, Katekavia handed over its fleet to Turukhan Airlines. Katekavia was rebranded as a leisure carrier and renamed Azur Air.

In February 2018, the Russian aviation authority Rosaviatsiya announced that Azur Air faces a suspension of its operational licence by 20 March 2018 if the carrier does not resolve alleged safety violations by then. As this would lead to the shut down of all flight operations, Russian tourism agency RosTourism advised tour operators to not sell tickets on Azur Air for the time being.

On 8 April 2022, the US Department of Commerce restricted flights on aircraft manufactured in the US for Aeroflot, Aviastar, Azur Air, Belavia, Rossiya and Utair. It seems the US wants to reclaim ownership of the intellectual property. On 16 June, the US broadened its restrictions on the six airlines after violations of the sanctions regime were detected. The effect of the restrictions is to ground the US-manufactured part of its fleet.

As of July 2022, Azur Air was forced to drastically reduce its international network due to sanctions against Russia as well as the recall of several aircraft by their lessors in accordance with these.

== Fleet ==
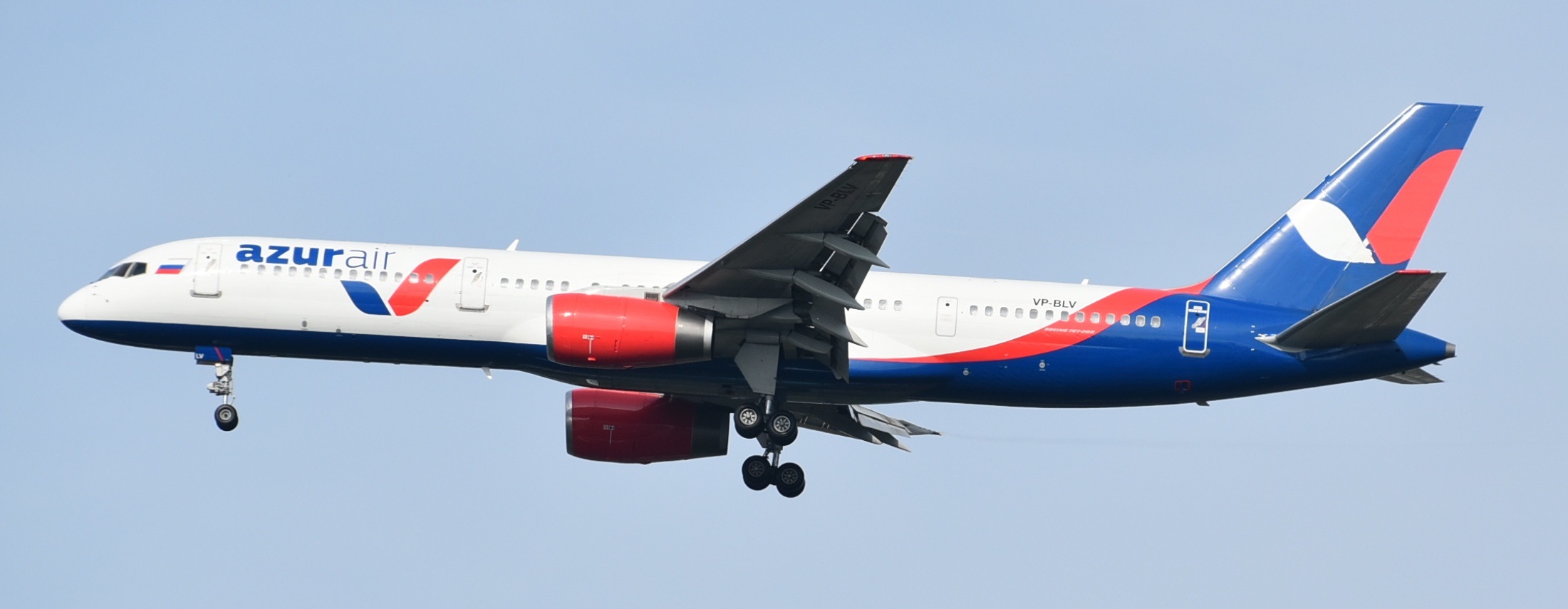
Azur Air Boeing 757-200

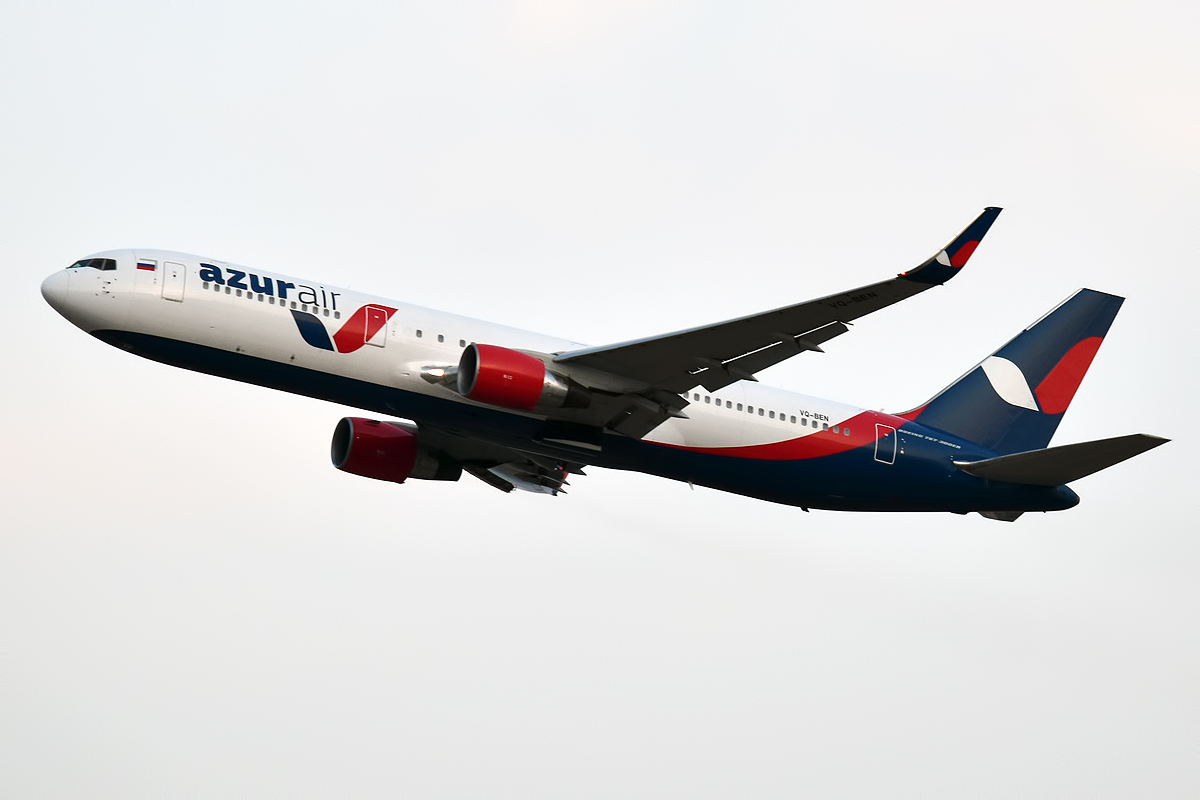
Azur Air Boeing 767-300ER

=== Current fleet ===
As of August 2025, Azur Air operates the following aircraft:

Aircraft	In service	Orders	Passengers			Notes
Aircraft	In service	Orders	J	Y	Total	Notes
Boeing 737-800	1	—	—	189	189	One aircraft is stored.
Boeing 757-200	10	—	—	238	238	
Boeing 767-300ER	6	—	—	336	336	
Total	17	—				

== Accidents and incidents ==
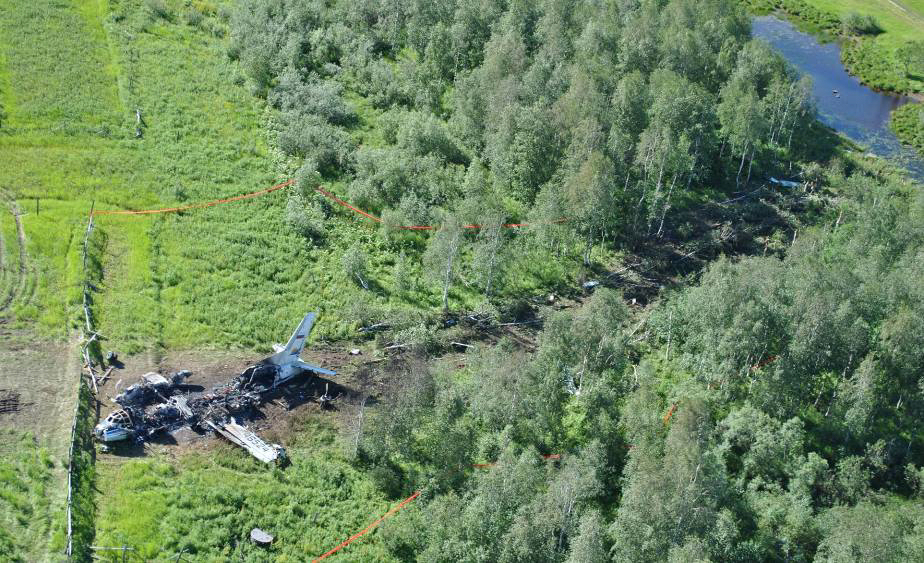
Crash site of Katekavia Flight 9357

- On 3 August 2010, Katekavia Flight 9357, an Antonov An-24, crashed on approach to Igarka Airport, killing twelve people. The crash was caused by pilot error. As a result of the crash, the Russian government started to investigate how Katekavia operated their flights.
- In January 2023, a Boeing 757 with flight registration RA-73071 and flight number AZV2463 from Perm, Russia, to Goa, India, was affected by an e-mail bomb threat causing it to be diverted to Termez Airport in Uzbekistan for inspection while flying over Pakistan airspace. The threat was eventually determined to be false, and the flight, which carried 238 passengers including two infants and seven crew members, was allowed to continue to its destination. This incident followed a bomb threat against a flight from Moscow to Goa which led to an emergency landing at Jamnagar Airport in Gujarat.
- On 5 February 2023, a Boeing 767 with flight number ZF3774 from Phuket, Thailand, to Krasnoyarsk, Russia, aborted take-off after the aircraft's tire exploded.
