= Obruchev's Museum of Local History of Kyakhta =

Museum in Kyakhta, Buryatia, Russia

- Кяхтинский краеведческий музей
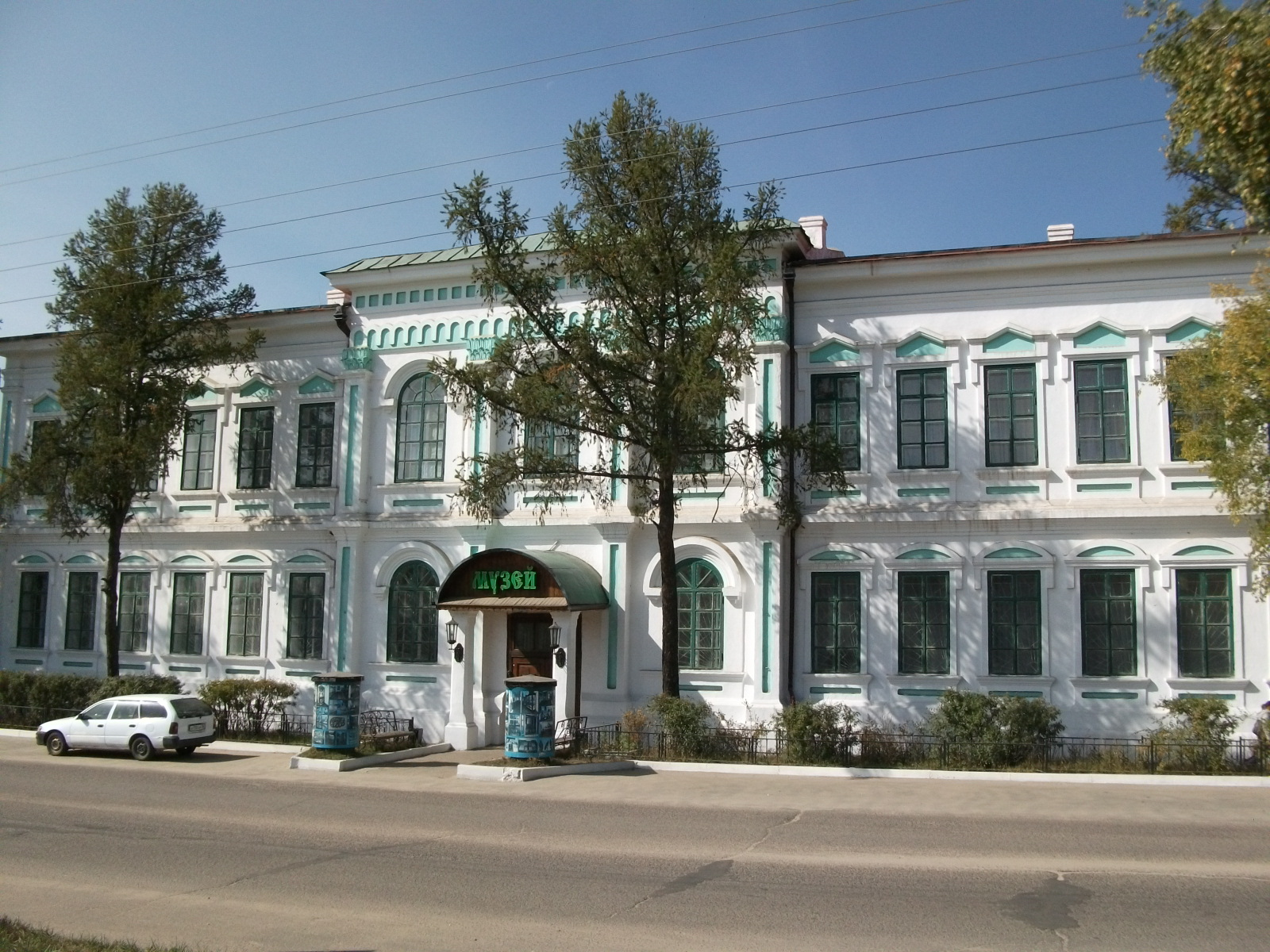

- Location within Republic of Buryatia
- Established: 1890
- Location: Kyakhta, Buryatia, Russia
- Coordinates: 50°21′28.0″N 106°27′06.0″E
- Type: museum
- Collection size: 120,000
- Website: Official website (in Russian)

The Obruchev's Museum of Local History of Kyakhta (Russian: Кяхтинский краеведческий музей) is a museum in Kyakhta, Republic of Buryatia, Russia.

== History ==
The museum was established in 1890.

== Architecture ==
The museum is located in a former school building. The building was designed with classical Russian architecture.

== Exhibitions ==
The museum exhibits more than 120,000 artifacts, which consists of archaeology, flora and fauna, Russian-Chinese trade objects, documentation and photos etc.

== See also ==
- List of museums in Russia
