= Katekavia Flight 9357 =

2010 aviation accident

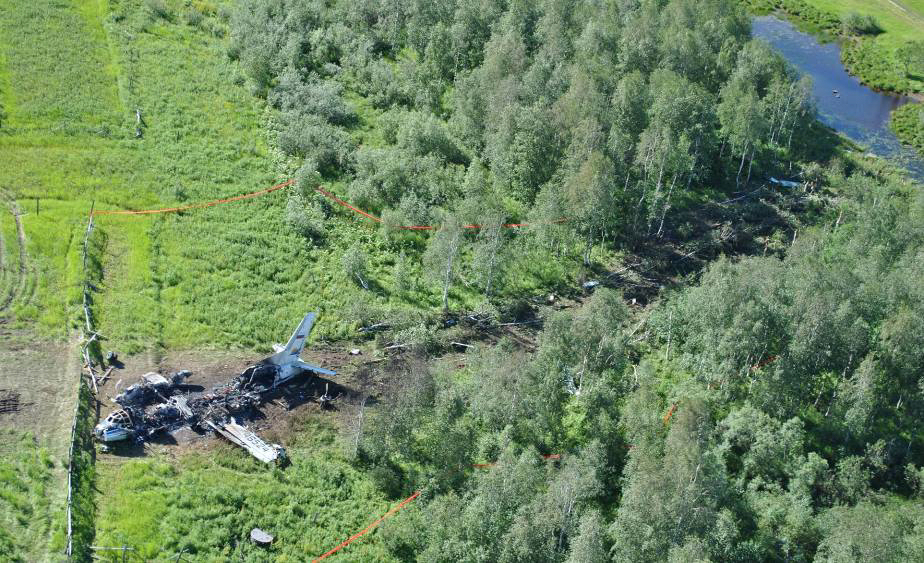
- The wreckage of Flight 9357 at the crash site

Accident
- Date: 3 August 2010
- Summary: Controlled flight into terrain
- Site: 0.4 km from Igarka Airport's runway, Russia; 67°26′42″N 86°35′30″E

Aircraft
- Aircraft type: Antonov An-24RV
- Operator: Katekavia
- IATA flight No.: KY9357
- Call sign: (46)524
- Registration: RA-46524
- Flight origin: Krasnoyarsk Cheremshanka Airport, Krasnoyarsk, Russia
- Destination: Igarka Airport, Igarka, Russia
- Occupants: 15
- Passengers: 11
- Crew: 4
- Fatalities: 12 (all 11 passengers, 1 out of 4 crew)
- Injuries: 3
- Survivors: 3 (flight crew)

Katekavia Flight 9357 was an Antonov An-24 regional aircraft on a domestic flight from Krasnoyarsk to Igarka in Russia that crashed on final approach in fog in the early hours of 3 August 2010, killing twelve out of the fifteen people on board.

The accident investigation concluded that the crew attempted an approach to land in visibility conditions worse than the approved minima for that airfield and aircraft, and failed to execute a missed approach procedure in a timely manner before the aircraft struck trees and terrain.

== Accident ==
The aircraft crashed while on final approach for a landing at Igarka Airport, around 700 metres (2,300 ft) short of the runway. Conditions at the time of the crash were reported to be raining, with light clouds and thunderstorms in the area. The crash occurred at around 01:40 local time (17:40 UTC, 2 August). A government agency, the Federal Air Transport Agency, said that "the plane veered to the right of its landing course and collided with the ground in front of the runway."

== Aircraft ==
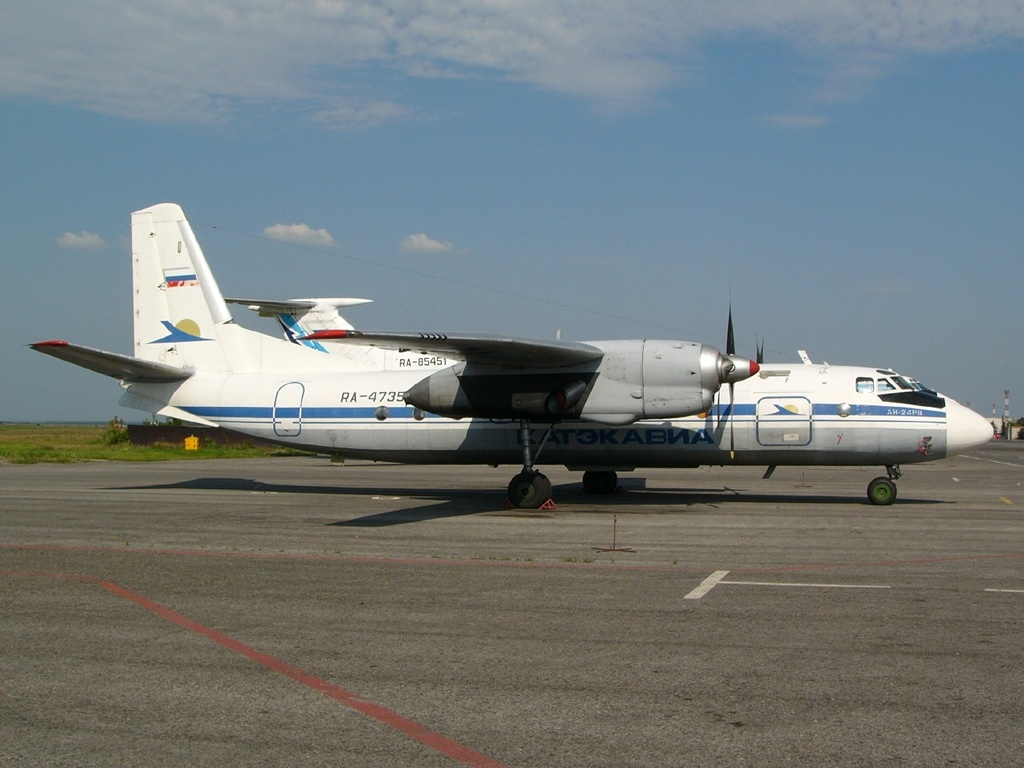
An Antonov An-24 of Katekavia similar to the accident aircraft

The aircraft involved was a twin-turboprop Antonov An-24RV with serial number 47310003 and Russian registration RA-46524. Built in 1974, at the time of the accident the airframe had logged almost 54,000 hours of flight.

== Casualties ==
Ten of the passengers and one crew member on board the plane died in the crash, while three of the crew members and one passenger survived. The passenger later died at the hospital of sustained injuries on 3 August 2010, bringing the death toll to twelve. The other three survivors sustained only minor injuries. The three survivors were the pilot, the co-pilot, and the flight engineer. Originally, all on board were said to have died; subsequent reports said seven people died before a death toll of eleven and later twelve was established.

== Aftermath ==
Soon after the crash, a fire at the site was extinguished, allowing for a search for the aircraft's black boxes. An investigation was also begun shortly after the incident. Both the cockpit voice recorder (CVR) and the flight data recorder (FDR) were recovered, although the CVR contained only data from the first 80 minutes of the 90-minute flight. The FDR contained a complete record of the flight.

As a result of the crash, a government investigation into the operating practices of Katekavia was begun.

== Investigation ==
Final report by MAK into the crash of RA-46524

A preliminary investigation indicated that the crash occurred due to fog in the area, leading the plane to hit trees ahead of the runway.

The final accident report by Moscow's Interstate Aviation Committee (MAK) was released in October 2010, concluding that the cause of the crash was attempting the landing approach in conditions worse than the meteorological minima of the airfield, the aircraft, and the commander. The crew failed to make a timely decision to go-around. They descended below the established minimum safe altitude in the absence of reliable visual contact with runway or approach lights, which led to a collision of the aircraft with trees and terrain.

The MAK commented that had the recommendations following the 2007 crash of UTair Flight 471 been implemented, the accident may have been prevented. A total of 19 safety recommendations were made.
