= Igarka Airport =

Igarka
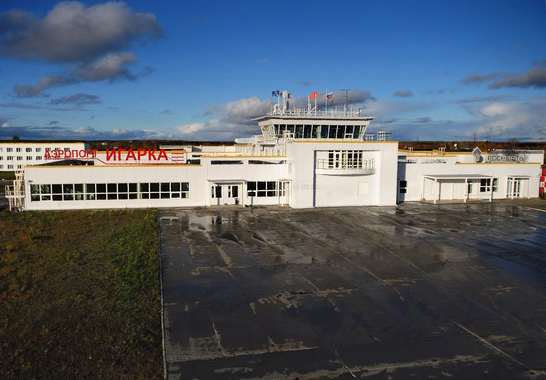
- IATA: IAA; ICAO: UOII

Summary
- Airport type: Public
- Operator: Igarka branch of Yeniseyskiy Meridian
- Serves: Igarka
- Location: Igarka, Russia
- Elevation AMSL: 82 ft / 25 m
- Coordinates: 67°26′12″N 86°37′18″E

Map
- Location of airport in Krasnoyarsk Krai

Runways
Direction	Length		Surface
Direction	ft	m	Surface
12/30	8,241	2,512	Concrete

Igarka Airport (Russian: Аэропорт "Игарка") (IATA: IAA, ICAO: UOII) is an airport in Krasnoyarsk Krai, Russia, located 3 kilometres (1.9 mi) south of Igarka. It accommodates medium-sized airliners. The facility is fully paved and well-maintained, but is isolated on an island and depends on ice crossing or ferry service. The terminus of the Salekhard–Igarka Railway is located nearby.

== Airlines and destinations ==
Airlines	Destinations
Aeroflot	Krasnoyarsk–Yemelyanovo
KrasAvia	Krasnoyarsk–Cheremshanka, Norilsk
NordStar	Krasnoyarsk–Yemelyanovo
Turukhan Airlines	Svetlogorsk, Turukhansk

== Accidents and incidents ==
- On 3 August 2010, Katekavia Flight 9375 crashed on approach to Igarka. Twelve of the 15 people on board were killed.

== See also ==
- List of airports in Russia
