= Oleh Polischuk =

Ukrainian footballer (born 1991)

Personal information
- Full name: Oleh Leonidovych Polischuk
- Date of birth: 17 April 1991 (age 35)
- Place of birth: Igarka, Russian SFSR, Soviet Union
- Height: 1.70 m (5 ft 7 in)
- Position: Defender

Team information
- Current team: FC Desna Chernihiv

Youth career
- 2004–2005: RVUFK Kyiv
- 2005–2008: FC Dynamo Kyiv

Senior career*
Years	Team	Apps	(Gls)
2008–2009	FC Dynamo Kyiv	0	(0)
2008	FC Dynamo-3 Kyiv	8	(0)
2010–2011	PFC Sevastopol	19	(1)
2013–	FC Desna Chernihiv	4	(0)

International career^{‡}
2006–2007	Ukraine-16	15	(0)
2007–2008	Ukraine-17	5	(0)
2008–2009	Ukraine-18	9	(0)
2009–2010	Ukraine-19	15	(0)
2010	Ukraine-20	2	(0)
2010	Ukraine-21	1	(0)
- * Club domestic league appearances and goals as of 8 December 2021 ‡ National team caps and goals as of 26 February 2013

Oleh Polischuk (Ukrainian: Олег Леонідович Поліщук; born 17 April 1991 in Igarka, Krasnoyarsk Krai, Russian SFSR, Soviet Union) is a professional Ukrainian football defender who plays for FC Desna Chernihiv in the Ukrainian Second League.

Polischuk began his playing career with FC Dynamo Kyiv's third team. He joined Sevastopol, where he played for the second team until he was promoted to the first team in 2010. He made his first team debut entering as a second-half substitute against FC Arsenal Bila Tserkva on 8 April 2010.

In March 2010, Polischuk was called up to the Ukraine national under-19 football team for a series of friendly matches against France in preparation for the 2010 UEFA European Under-19 Championship.
