= Myshkin (town) =

Town in Yaroslavl Oblast, Russia

Myshkin Мышкин
- Town
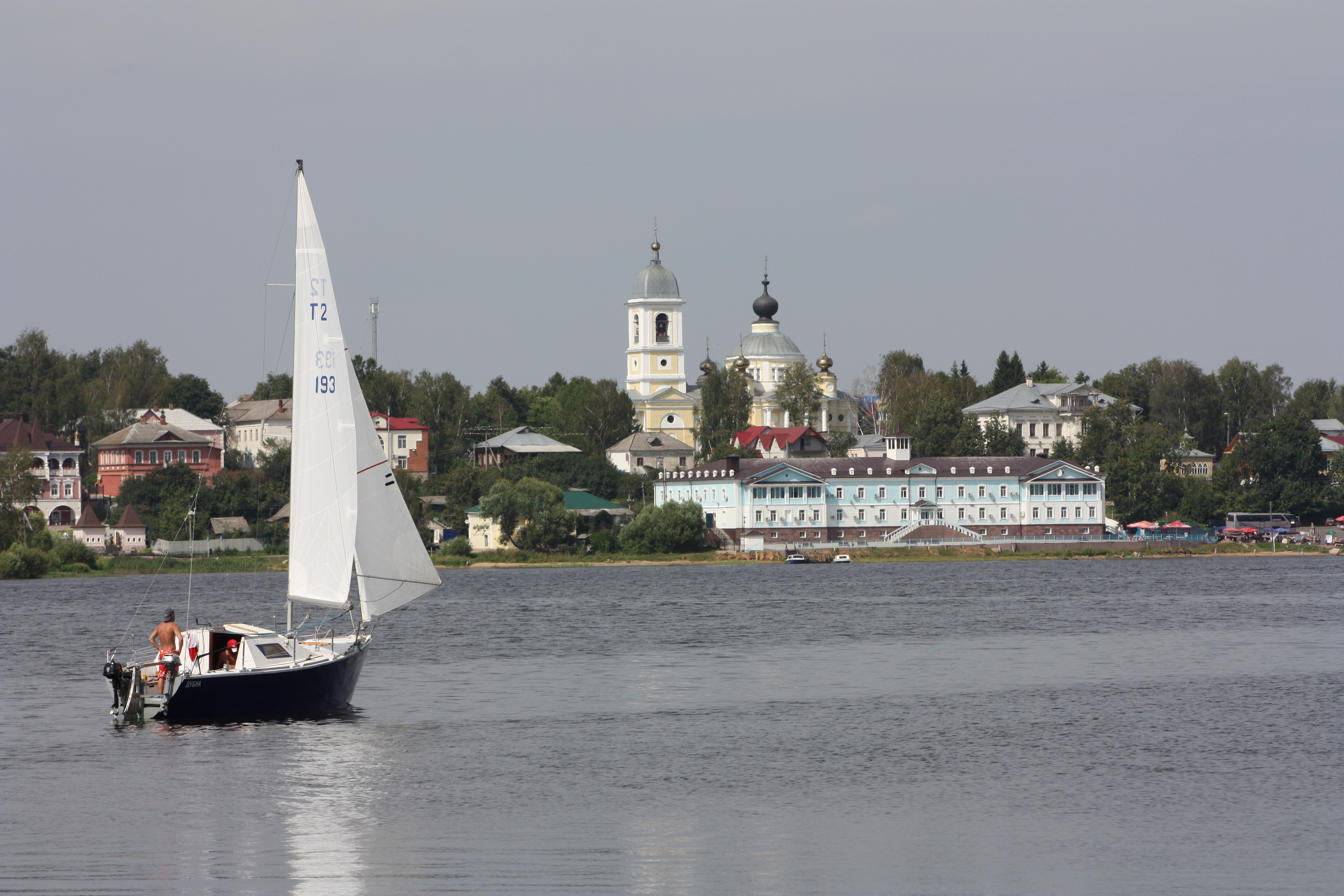
- View of Myshkin

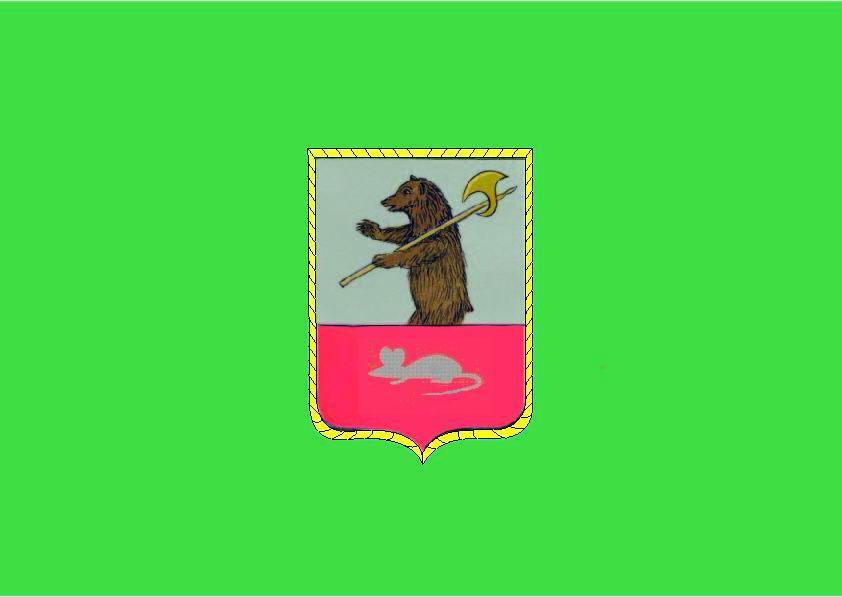
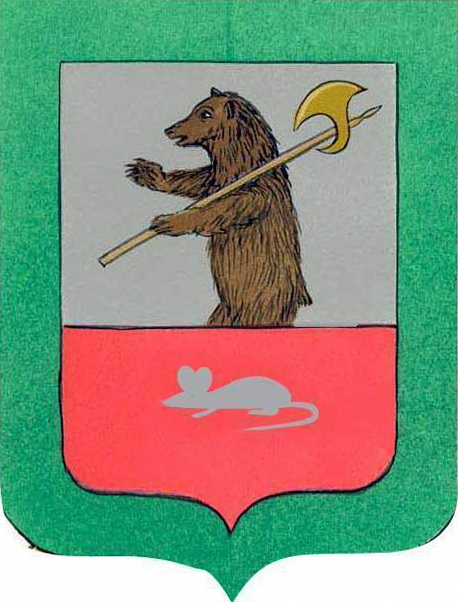
- Flag Coat of arms
- Interactive map of Myshkin
- Location of Myshkin Myshkin (Yaroslavl Oblast)
- Coordinates: 57°48′N 38°28′E
- Country: Russia
- Federal subject: Yaroslavl Oblast
- Administrative district: Myshkinsky District
- Town of district significanceSelsoviet: Myshkin
- Known since: 15th century
- Town status since: 1991
- Elevation: 110 m (360 ft)

Population (2010 Census)
  - Total: 5,932
  - Estimate (1 January 2018): 5,647 (−4.8%)

Administrative status
  - Capital of: town of district significance of Myshkin

Municipal status
  - Municipal district: Myshkinsky Municipal District
  - Urban settlement: Myshkin Urban Settlement
  - Capital of: Myshkinsky Municipal District, Myshkin Urban Settlement
- Time zone: UTC+3 (MSK)
- Postal code: 152830
- OKTMO ID: 78621101001
- Website: www.gorodmyshkin.ru

Myshkin (Russian: Мы́шкин, IPA: [ˈmɨʂkʲɪn]) is a town and the administrative center of Myshkinsky District in Yaroslavl Oblast, Russia, located on the steep left bank of the Volga. Population: 5,932 (2010 census); 6,076 (2002 census); 6,340 (1989 Soviet census).

== History ==
A settlement at this location has existed since at least the 15th century. Town status was granted to it in 1777. It was demoted in status to that of an urban-type settlement in Soviet times, but was granted town status again in 1991.

== Administrative and municipal status ==
Within the framework of administrative divisions, Myshkin serves as the administrative center of Myshkinsky District. As an administrative division, it is incorporated within Myshkinsky District as the town of district significance of Myshkin. As a municipal division, the town of district significance of Myshkin is incorporated within Myshkinsky Municipal District as Myshkin Urban Settlement.

== Tourism and culture ==
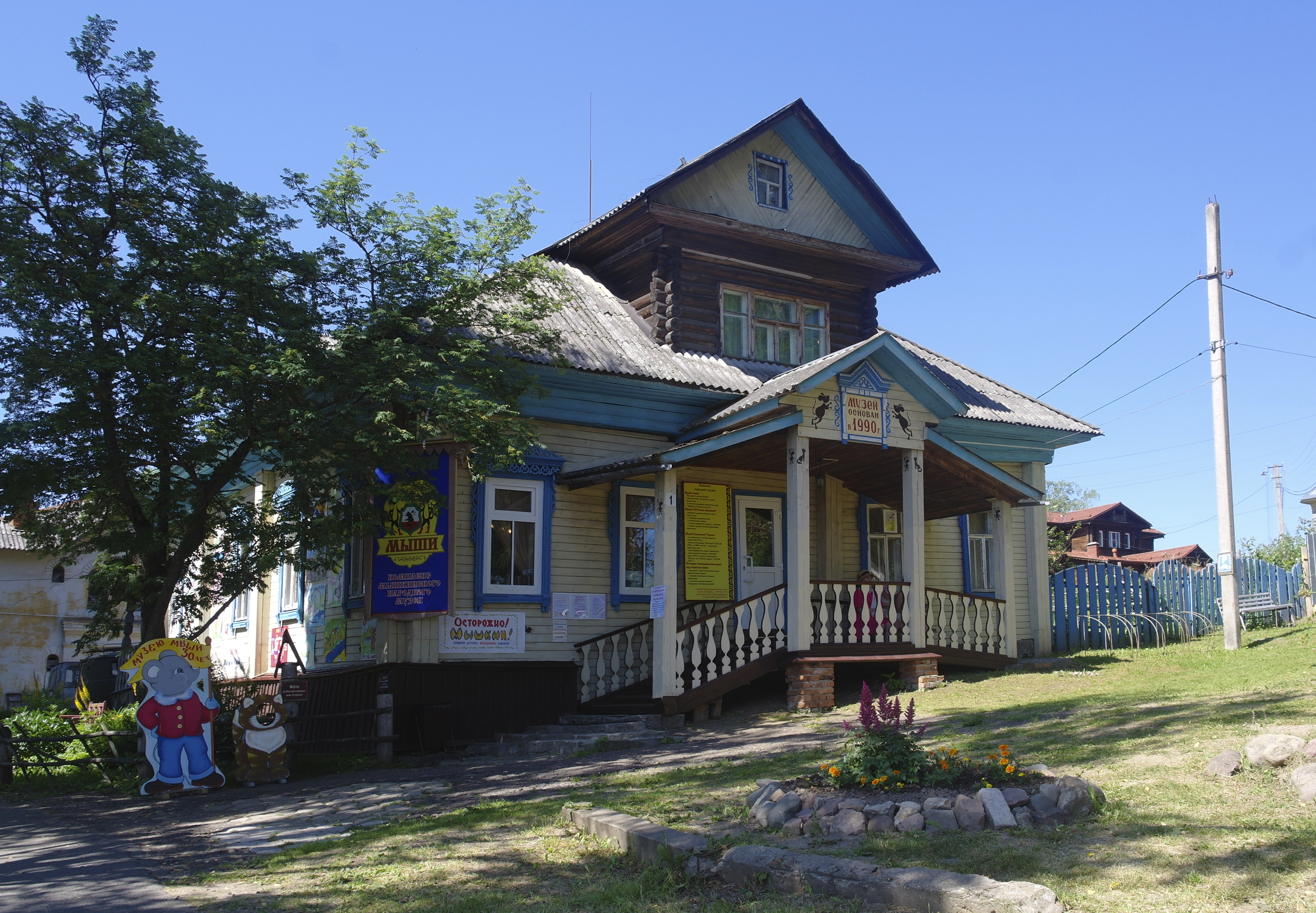
The Mouseland Museum in Myshkin

The town attracts a significant number of tourists usually arriving by river cruise ships. Myshkin retains architectural features characteristic for the 19th century Russia. It also features a number of museums. One of them is the unique Mouse Museum (the name of the town is derived from the word "мышь" (mysh) meaning mouse in Russian). There are also a Museum of Valenki (valenki being a type of Russian felt boots), an ethnographic museum, an art gallery, an open air retro car museum and more.

== Notable people ==
- German Tatarinov (1925–2006), painter
