= Myshkinsky District =

Myshkinsky District Мышкинский район (Russian)
- District
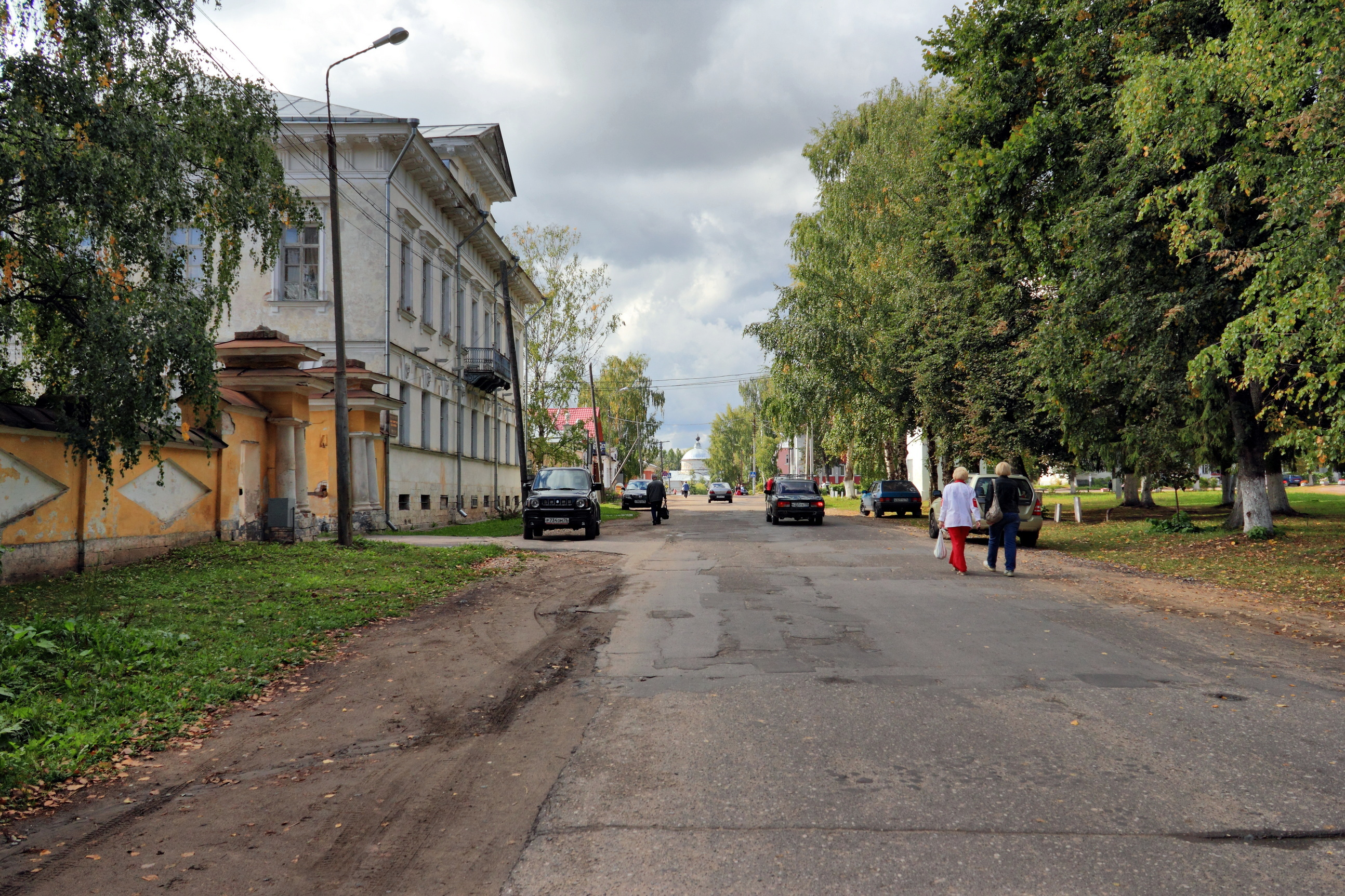
- A street in the town of Myshkin, the administrative center of the district

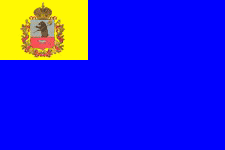
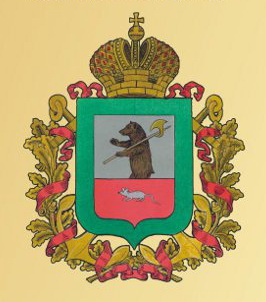
- Flag Coat of arms
- Location of Myshkinsky District in Yaroslavl Oblast
- Coordinates: 57°47′N 38°27′E
- Country: Russia
- Federal subject: Yaroslavl Oblast
- Established: 1929
- Administrative center: Myshkin

Area
  - Total: 1,111.2 km^{2} (429.0 sq mi)

Population (2010 Census)
  - Total: 10,329
  - Estimate (2018): 9,541 (−7.6%)
  - Density: 9.2954/km^{2} (24.075/sq mi)
  - Urban: 57.4%
  - Rural: 42.6%

Administrative structure
  - Administrative divisions: 1 Towns of district significance, 10 Rural okrugs
  - Inhabited localities: 1 cities/towns, 253 rural localities

Municipal structure
  - Municipally incorporated as: Myshkinsky Municipal District
  - Municipal divisions: 1 urban settlements, 2 rural settlements
- Time zone: UTC+3 (MSK)
- OKTMO ID: 78621000
- Website: http://www.myshkinmr.ru/

Myshkinsky District (Russian: Мышкинский райо́н) is an administrative and municipal district (raion), one of the seventeen in Yaroslavl Oblast, Russia. It is located in the west of the oblast. The area of the district is 1,111.2 square kilometers (429.0 sq mi). Its administrative center is the town of Myshkin. Population: 10,329 (2010 Census); 11,885 (2002 census); 13,192 (1989 Soviet census). The population of Myshkin accounts for 57.4% of the district's total population.
