= Mouse Museum =

Museum in Myshkin, Yaroslavl, Russia

Myshkin National Ethnographic Museum
- Мышкинский народный этнографический музей
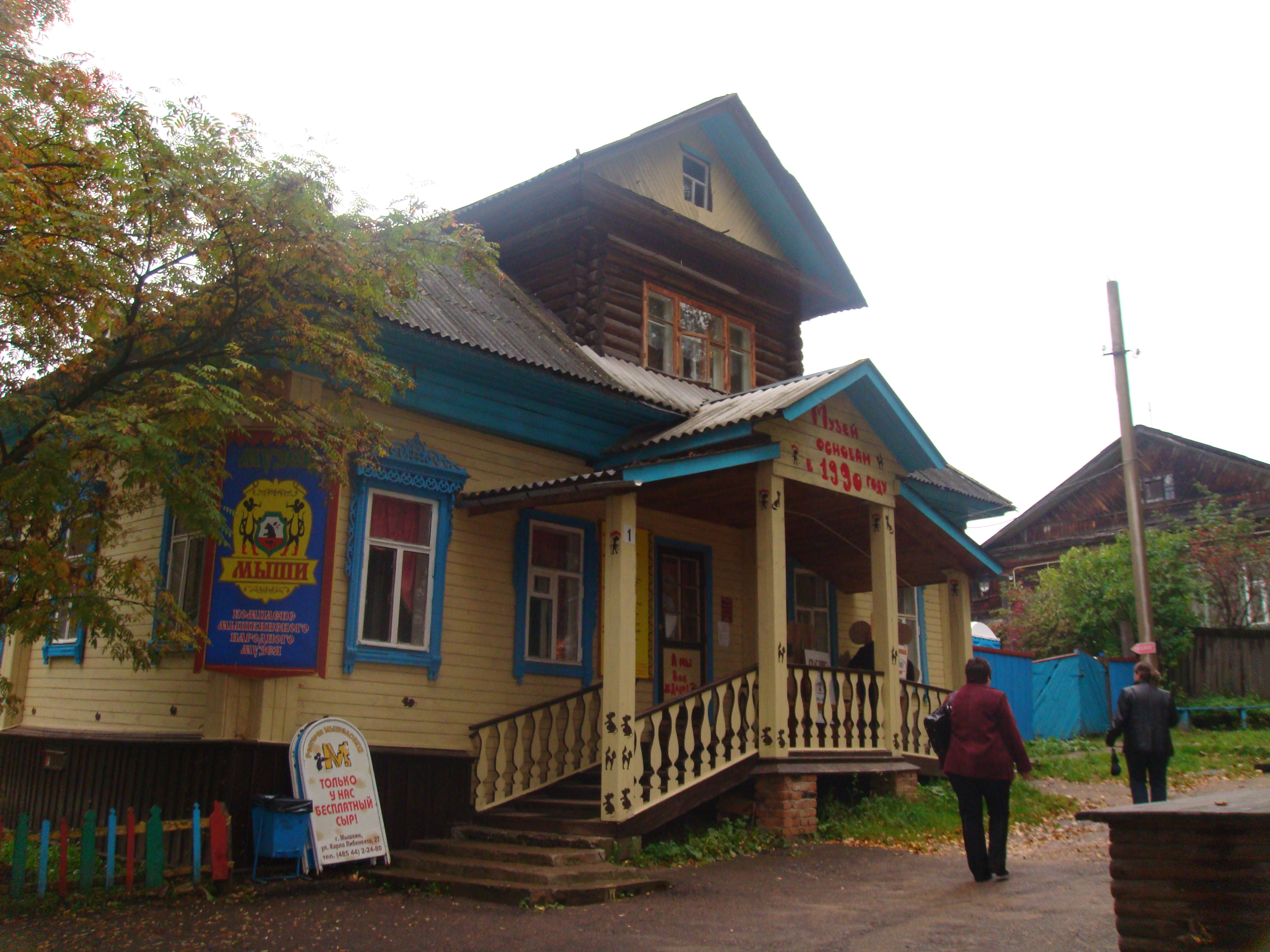
- Facade of the museum
- Established: 1990
- Location: Myshkin, Yaroslavl Oblast, Russia
- Coordinates: 57°46′58″N 38°26′58″E

The Myshkin National Ethnographic Museum (Russian: Мышкинский народный этнографический музей, Myshkinsky Narodny Etnografichesky Muzey) is located in the ancient town of Myshkin in Yaroslavl Oblast, Russia. Established in 1990, it is also uniquely known as the Mouse Museum for its collection of 2,000 mouse-related items from all over the globe. Mice made of various materials using diverse art techniques form a unique collection. Pieces have been gathered from different countries. In 1996, Myshkin held The International Festival "Mouse-96".

Every decade or so, when it is the Year of the Rat in the Chinese calendar, the town also holds a big celebration. The last such event was in 2008 and among the celebrants was President Dmitry Medvedev, who had a private tour of the town and was given a copy of The Town Named Mouse, an illustrated children's book in separate Russian and English editions written by Robert Aronson and illustrated by Marina Zorina.

The nonprofit Museum of the Mouse staff have also created and operate four other museums nearby—the Museum of Navigation, the Museum of Unique Machines (including an American school bus from Indiana), an outdoor Museum of Wooden Architecture and a Museum dedicated to the inventor of vodka, Pyotr Arsenievich Smirnov.

The website of the Museum of the Mouse is www.myshkingrad.ru (only in Russian, but with photos). The King-Myshaus site also operates a virtual Kingdom MouseLand. Contrary to reports, although there was a fire in one of the buildings near the museum, The Museum of the Mouse remains very much "alive and well" and is one of the main tourist sights in the Golden Ring of Russia. Each year more than 100,000 people visit the town and its many museums.

== See also ==
- Toy
- Mickey Mouse
- Fancy mouse
