= Permafrost Museum =

Museum in Russia

Coordinates: 67°27′55″N 86°36′35″E

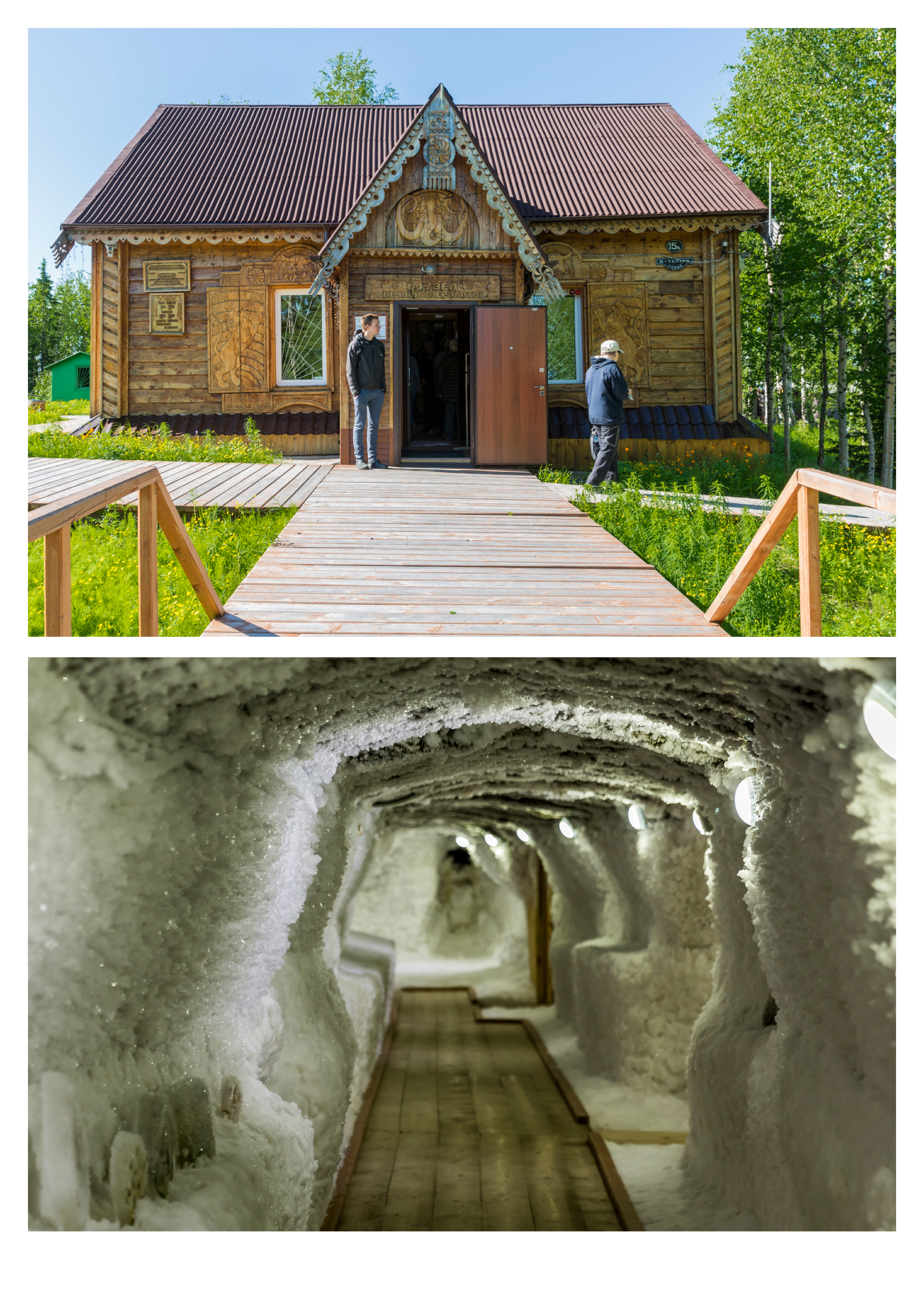
Permafrost Museum

The Permafrost Museum was established on 19 March 1965 in Igarka, Russia. It uniquely features underground structures within the thickness of permafrost.

The museum has won some pan-European prizes. The museum is located in the former geocryological lab founded in 1930 by the Siberian Branch of the Academy of Sciences of the Soviet Union. A year later, an underground permafrost research station was established. Several shafts were excavated by hand in late 1930s and early 1940s extending as far as 14 meters into the permafrost. Research in these facilities led to the development of building foundations specifically adapted to the permafrost.
