= Bataysk Museum of History =

Museum in Bataysk, Rostov, Russia

Bataysk Historical Museum
- Established: 22 April 1979
- Location: 51a Kirov Street, Bataysk, Rostov oblast, Russia
- Coordinates: 47°08′16″N 39°44′33″E
- Director: Zaburdyaeva Lyudmila Nikolaevna
- Website: "музейбатайска.рф". Archived from the original on 2017-02-02.

The Bataysk Museum of History (Russian: Батайский музей истории) is a historical museum in Bataysk, Rostov Oblast, Russia. The modern building of the museum is located in culture and recreation park of the city in the Kirov street, 51a.

== History ==
The first museum in Bataysk was opened in 1966 and was in a local cinema. Its original name was "The Museum of Revolutionary, military and Labor fame" It was located in only two rooms and its fund had only about 400 exhibits. The modern building of the museum was erected in 1979. The opening took place on 22 April of the same year.

The museum was named since 1993. At the moment its exhibition area is 430 square meters.

== Expositions of the museum ==
The contemporary museum exposition features are the town history, ethnography, and archeology. The museum has about 9 thousand original documents dedicated to the history of Bataysk.

The museum has three exposition halls:

- The Hall of Military Fame presents unique items from the Civil and the Great Patriotic Wars periods. The Bataysk sanctuary, the Memorial Wall with the names of all the town citizens, who died during the Great Patriotic War, is located within the hall territory. From time to time there are held solemn events, meetings of veterans of wars and meetings of search groups in the hall
- Hall of Local Lore
- Exhibition Hall

Expositions:

- The Bataysk Museum takes pride of the memorial exposition, devoted to the Baranov’s and Serov’s aviation schools history. 104 graduates from the town aviation schools were honored by the Hero of USSR title, five of them were honored with this title twice. The town is proud of its noble citizens. The most famous graduates are the legendary pilot Alexey Maresyev, the prototype of the main character of Boris Polevoy's novel "Story about a True Man", poet Ivan Shamov, who repeated the feat by Nikolay Ostrovskiy.
- Personal belongings of the first pilots-cosmonauts Vladimir Komarov, Yevgeny Khrunov, Victor Gorbatko.
- The museum features interesting exhibition, devoted to the history of Bataysk railway junction, one of the largest in Russia. The Vladikavkaz Railway line was constructed in 1875, by the Emperor Alexander II order. Ever since, Bataysk became the gateway to the Caucasus.
- The museum has unique ethnography displays, presenting a combination of the local habits and ways in various spheres, agricultural, industrial and cultural.
- Permanent exhibition of works of the Bataysk artist N.S. Losevsky.
