= Taganrog military museum =

Museum in Taganrog, Russia

- Таганрогский военно-исторический музей
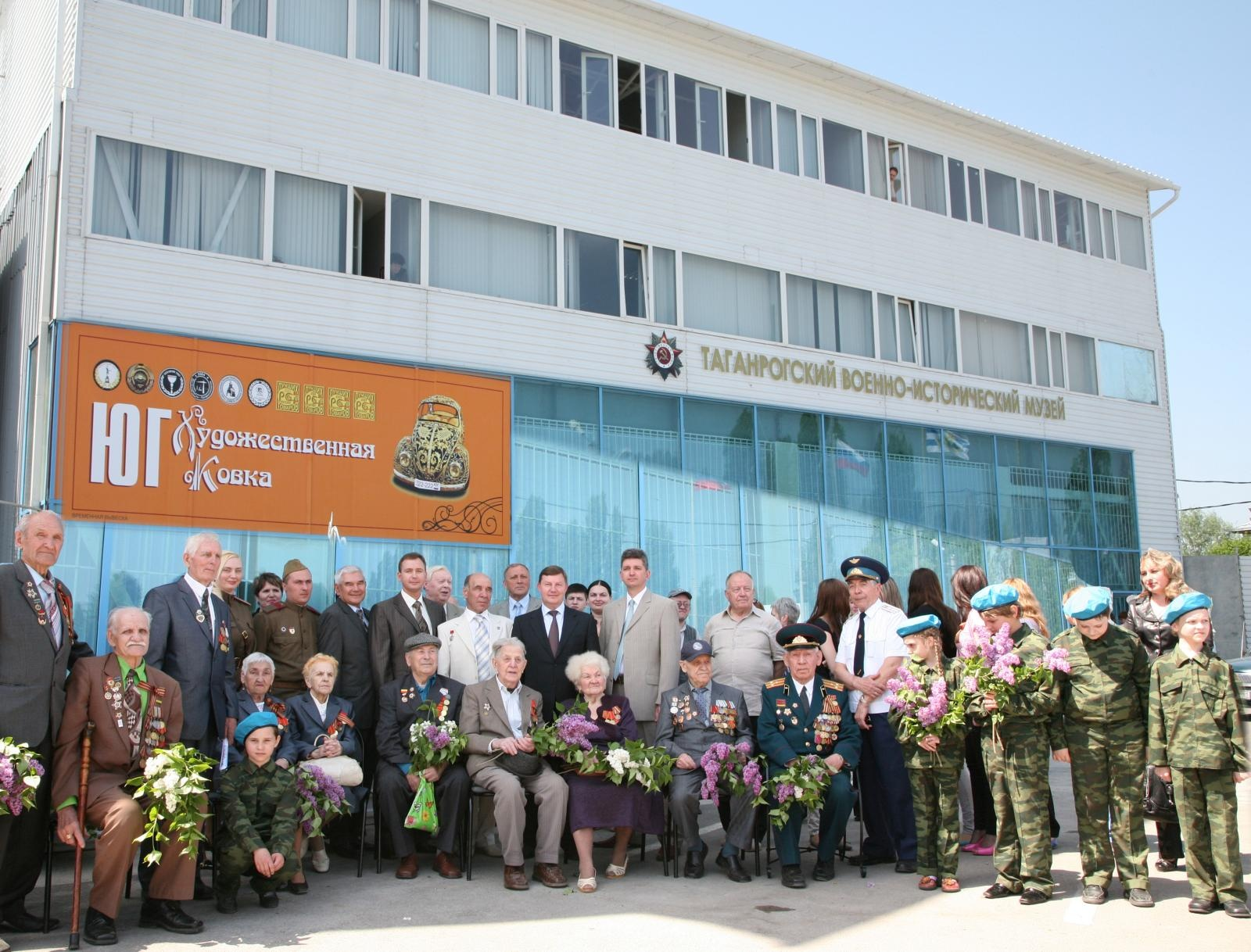
- Established: May 9, 2004 (opened on May 6, 2010)
- Location: Taganrog, Russia
- Coordinates: 47°13′22.44″N 38°56′3.22″E
- Director: ru:Гаркуша Игорь Викторович
- Website: military-museum.ru

Taganrog Military Museum is a private military museum in the Russian city of Taganrog. Its exhibits includes displays of military vehicles and weapons.

== Museum history ==
The start of museum exhibition creation refers to May 9, 2004.

On the night of October 25, 2014, the building of the Taganrog Military Museum and all of its exhibits were completely destroyed by fire.

== Museum exhibits ==
=== Cars and motorcycles ===
- GAZ-AA truck (in Russian)
- GAZ-67 jeep
- BA-64 armoured car
- Opel P4 car (in Russian)
- Opel Olympia car
- TIZ-AM-600 motorcycle (in Russian)
- М-72 motorcycle
- BMW R12 motorcycle

=== Weapon full-scale mockups ===
- Shpagin machine pistol (PPSh-41)
- Sudaev's submachine-gun (PPS)
- Tokarev Self-loading Rifle (SVT-40)
- Thompson submachine gun
- Mosin–Nagant
- Nagant M1895 Revolver
- Tokarev self-loading pistol
- Makarov pistol
- Volkov-Yartsev VYa-23 aircraft autocannon
- Degtyaryov's machine gun (DP, DT)
- PTRD anti-tank rifle
- PTRS-41 anti-tank rifle
- Maschinengewehr 34 (MG 34) machine gun
- MP 40 submachine gun
- Karabiner 98 Kurz bolt-action rifle
- Mauser C96 semi-automatic pistol
- Walther P38 semi-automatic pistol
- Luger P08 pistol (Parabellum)

=== Other exhibits ===
Ammunition mockups, cold weapons, military uniform, documents, household goods and other relics.

=== Gallery ===
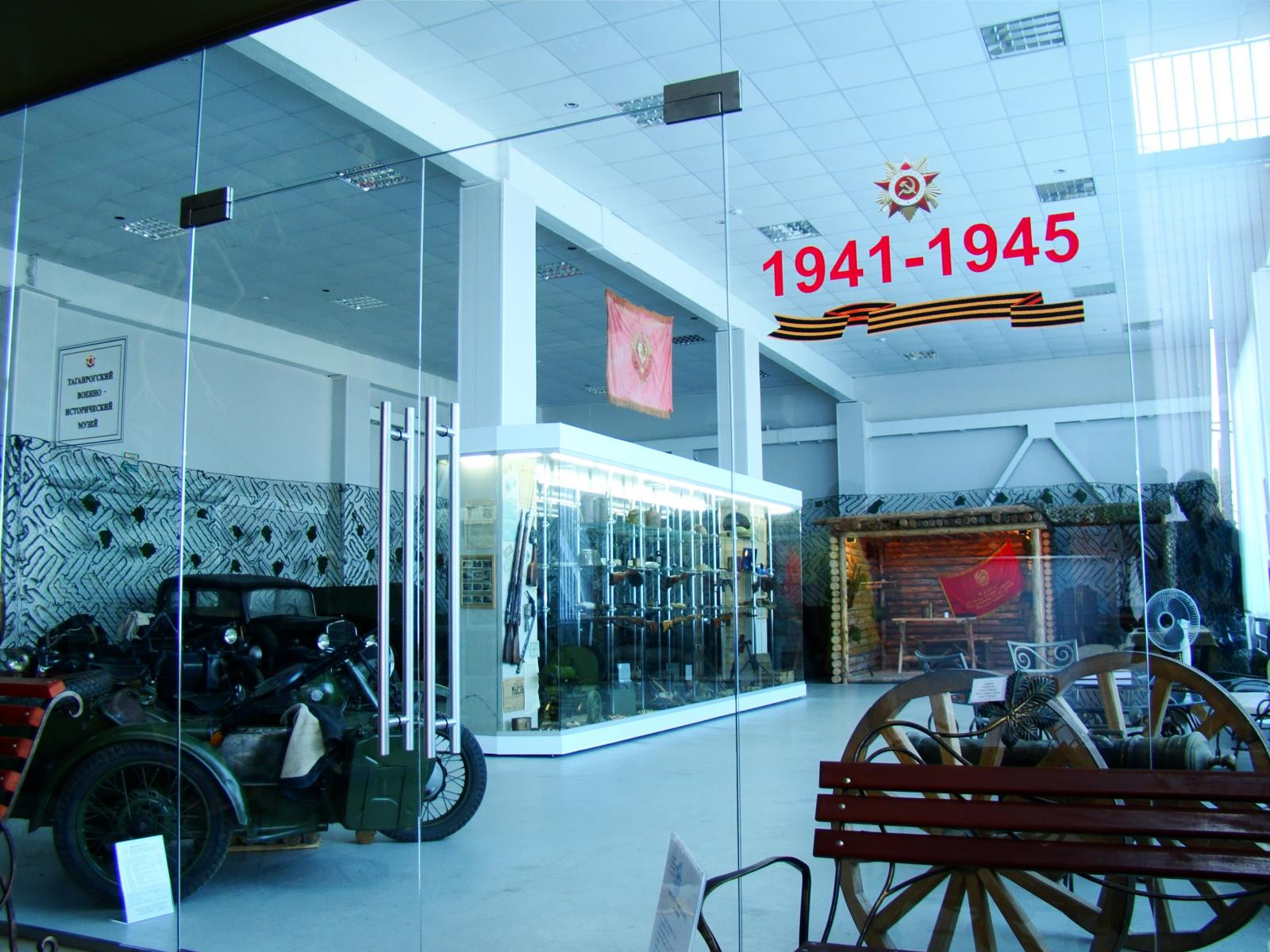

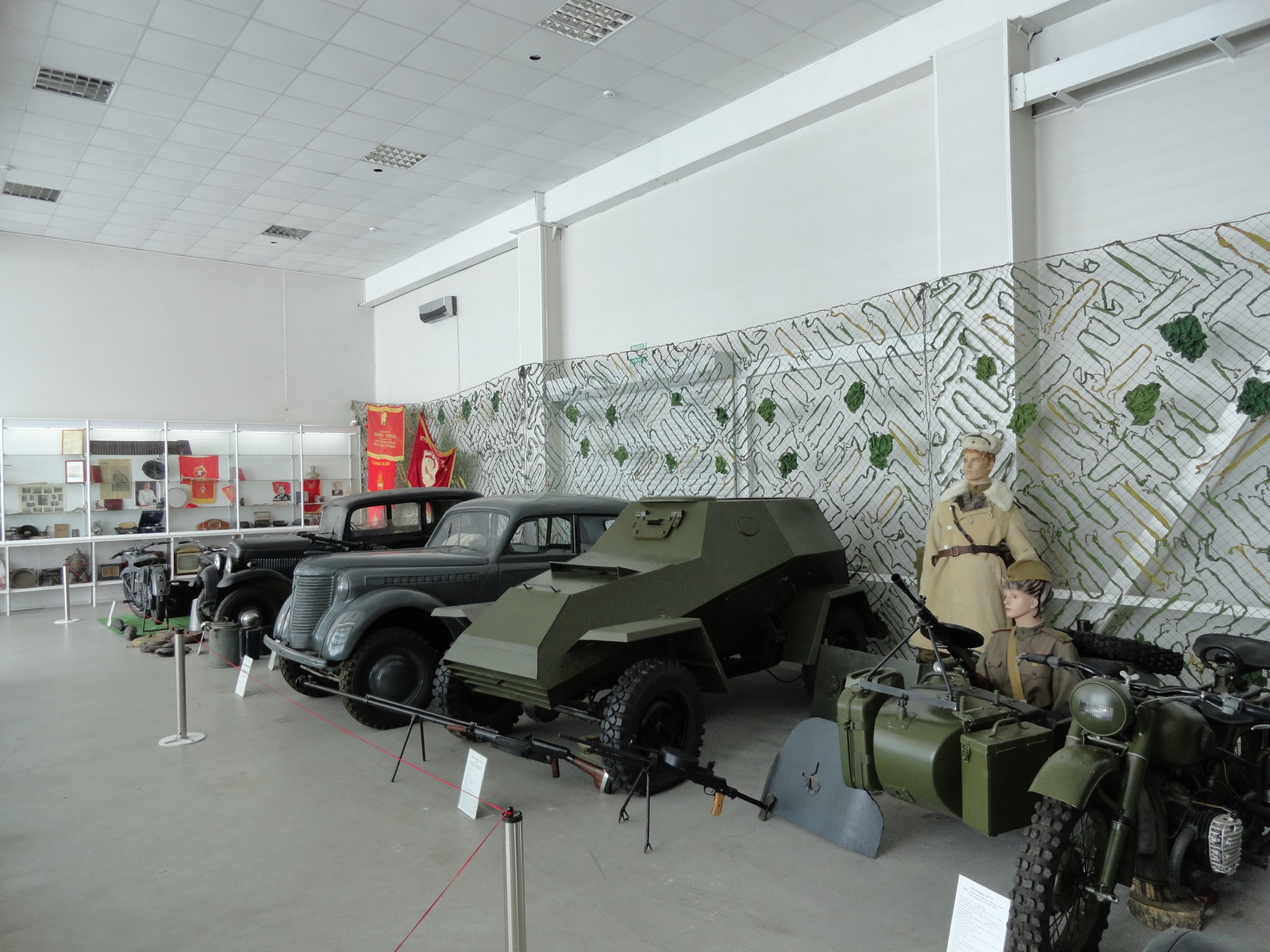

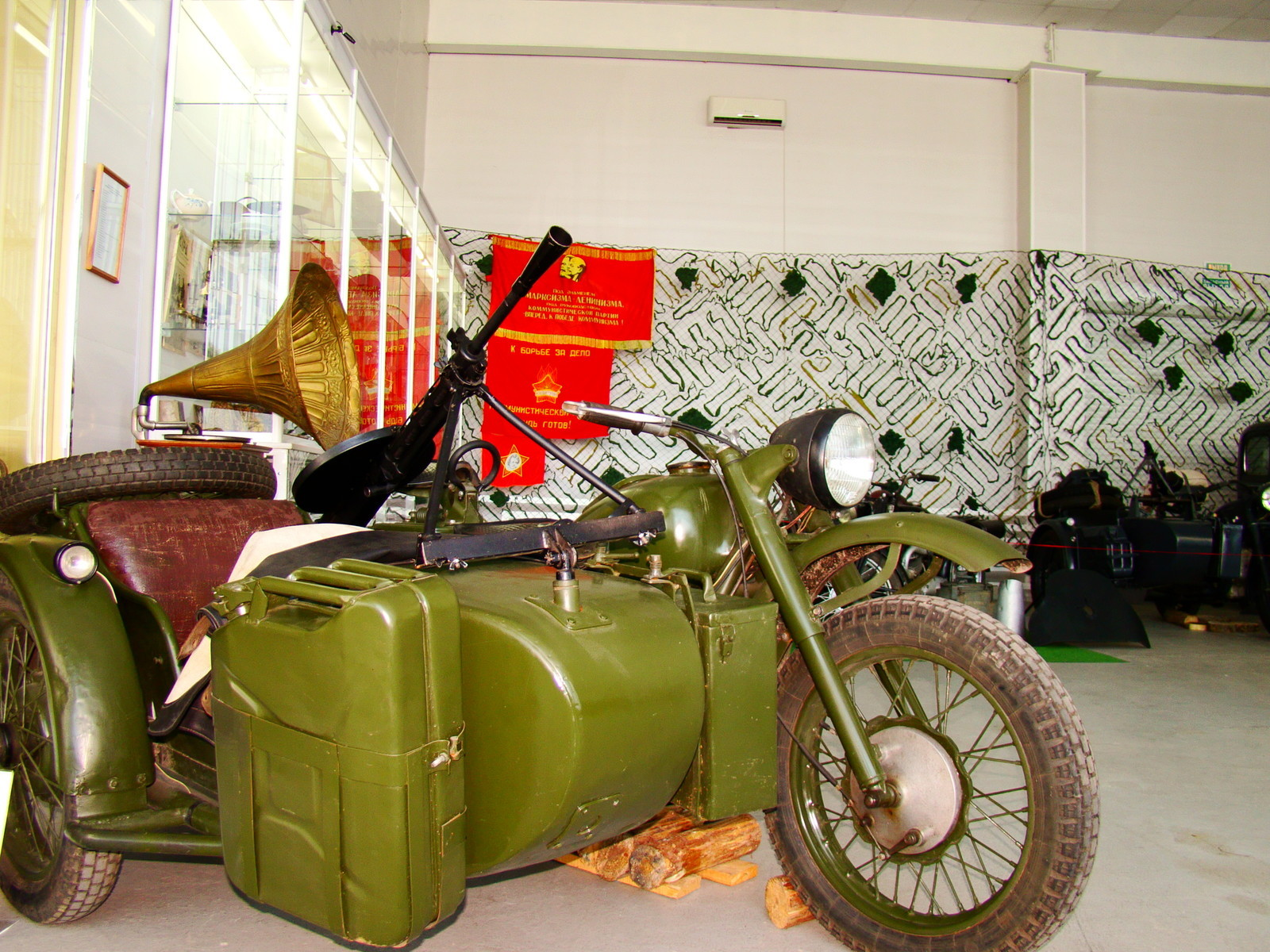

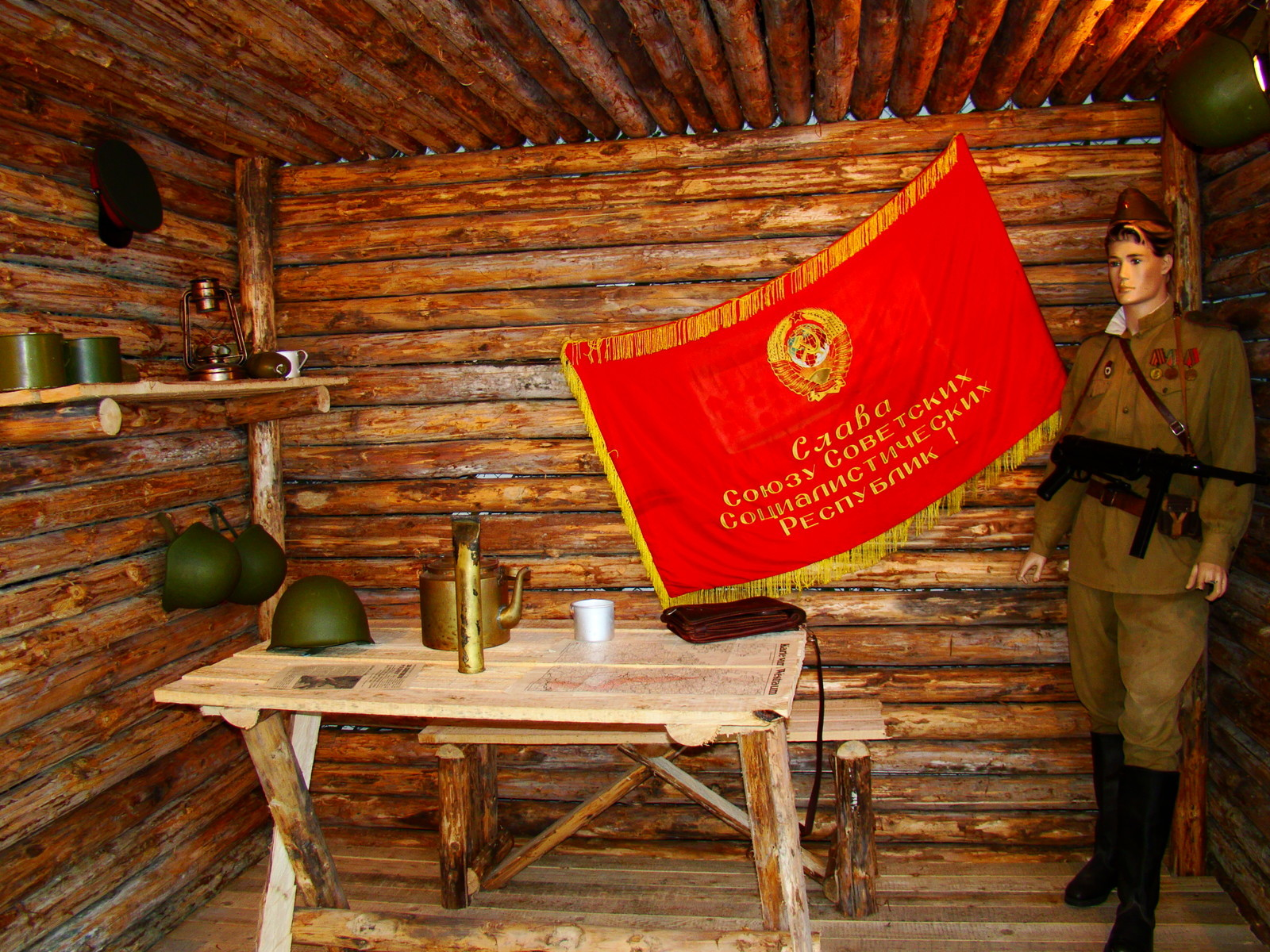

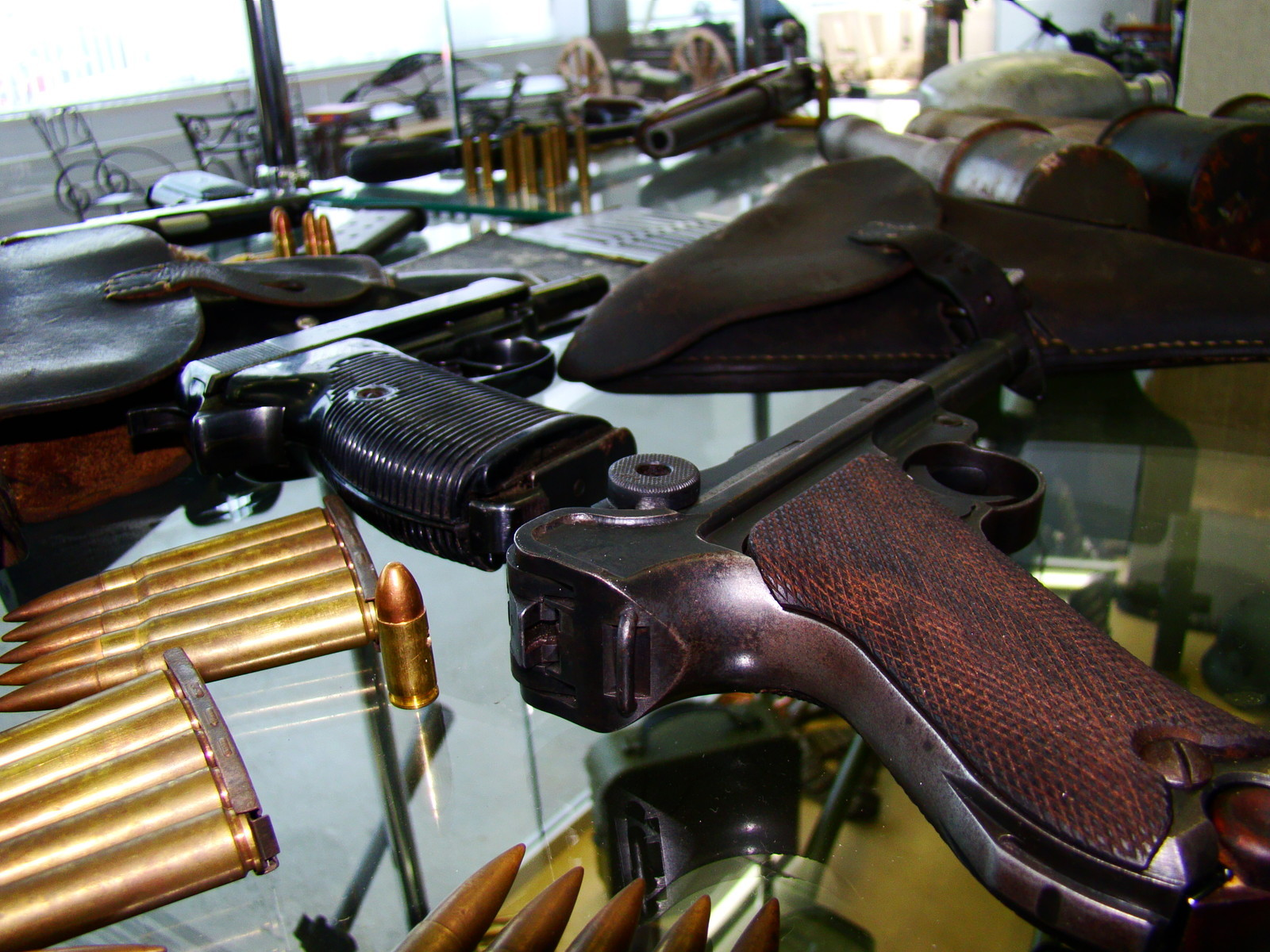

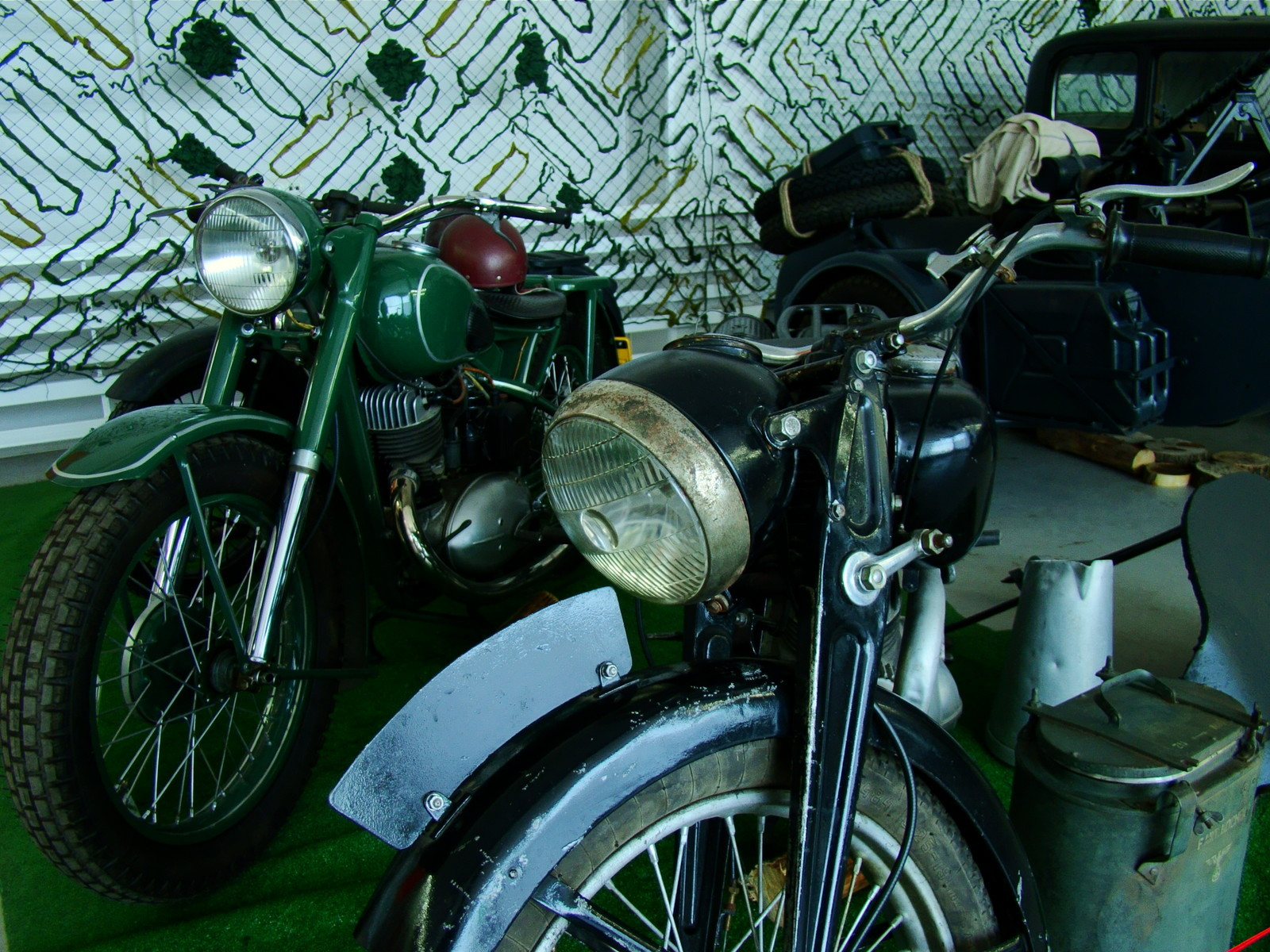

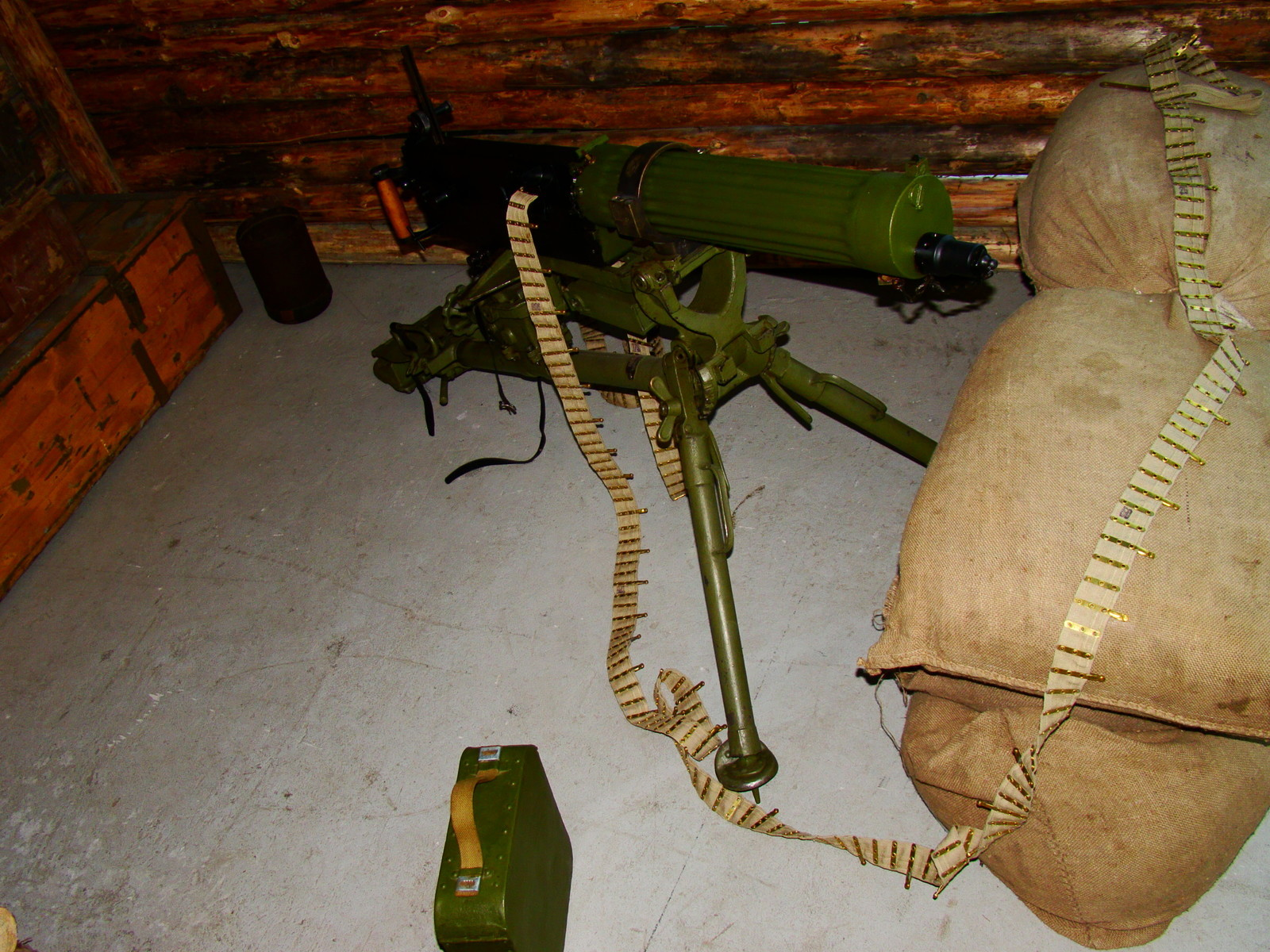

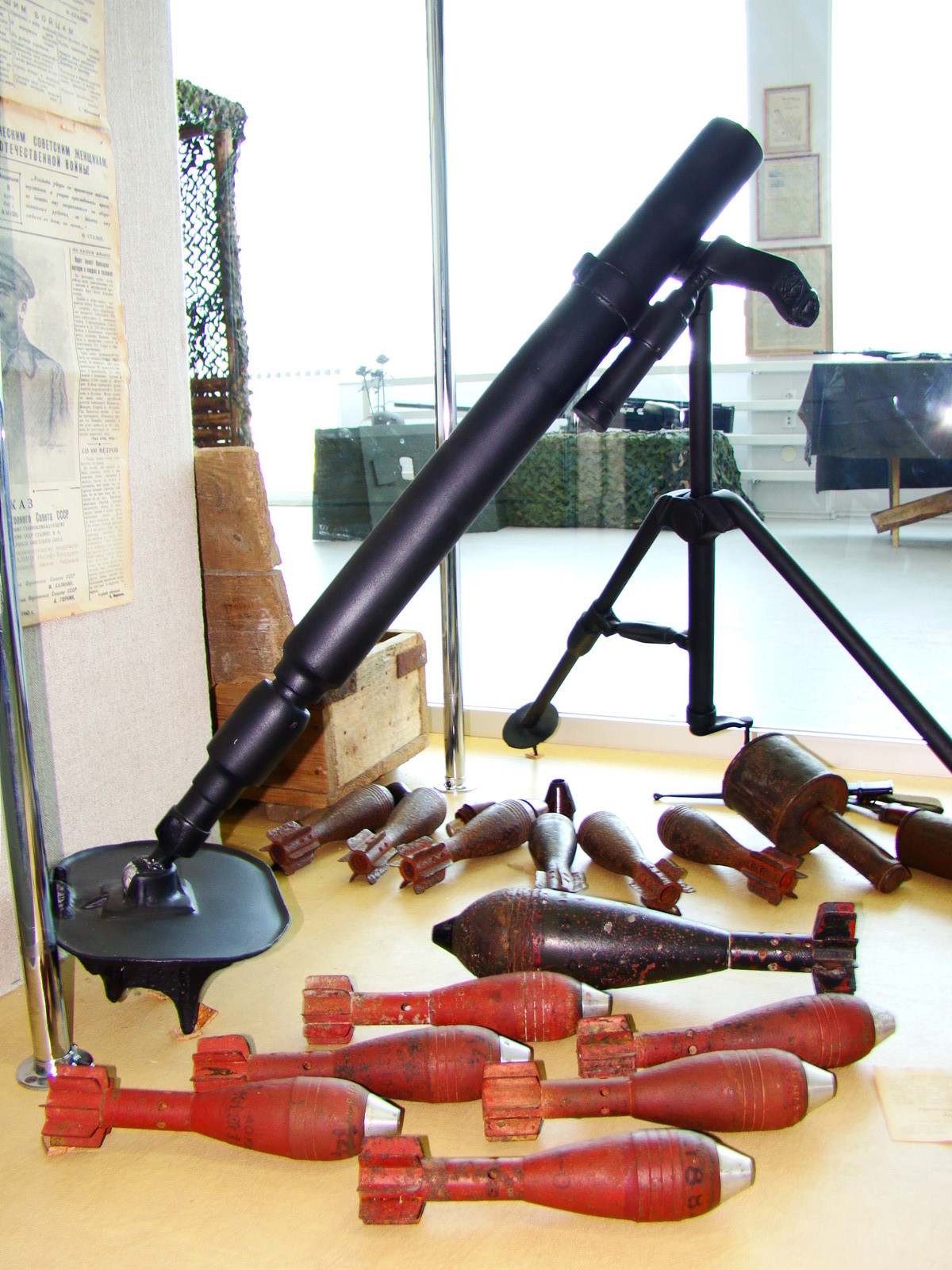

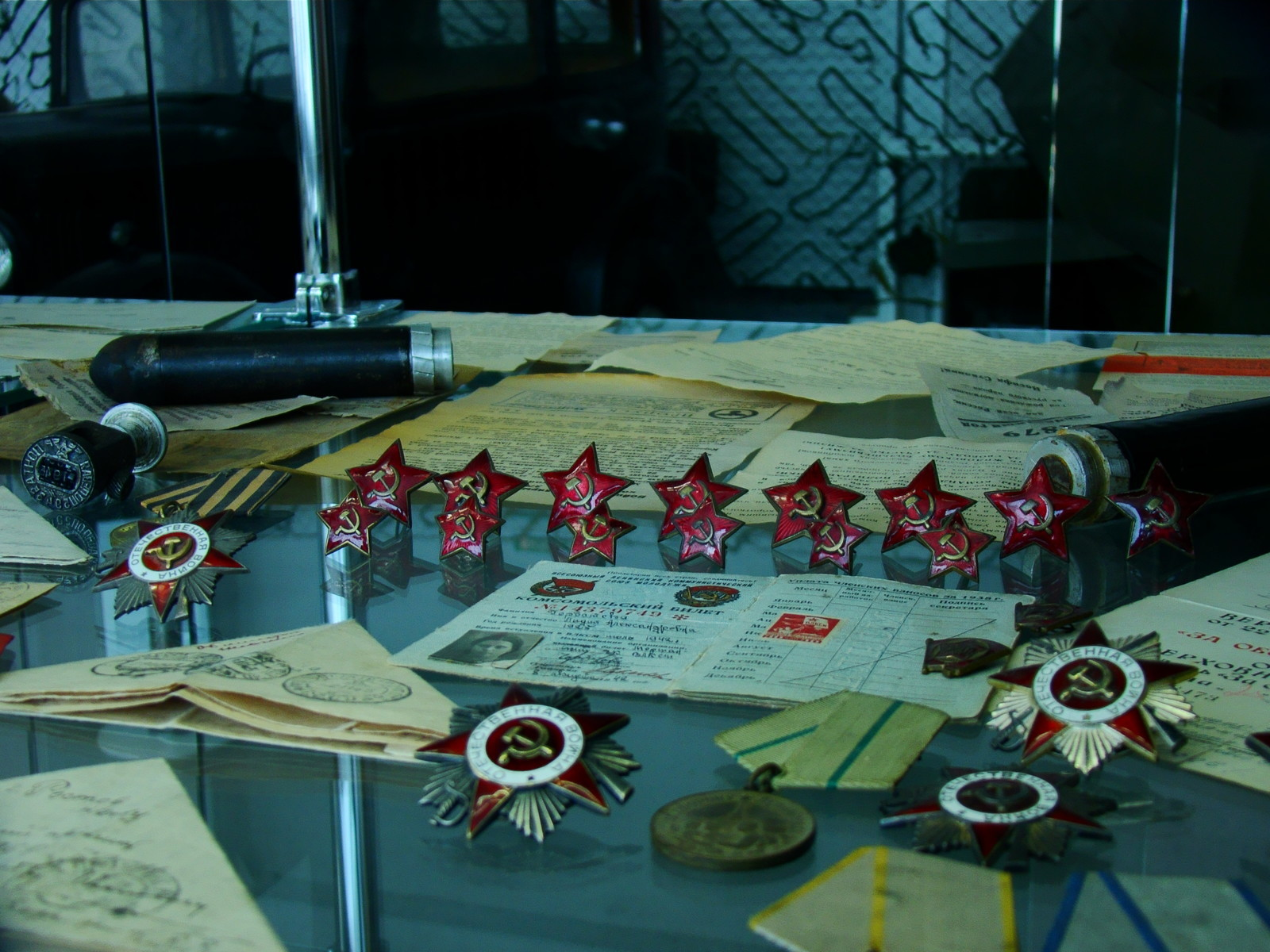

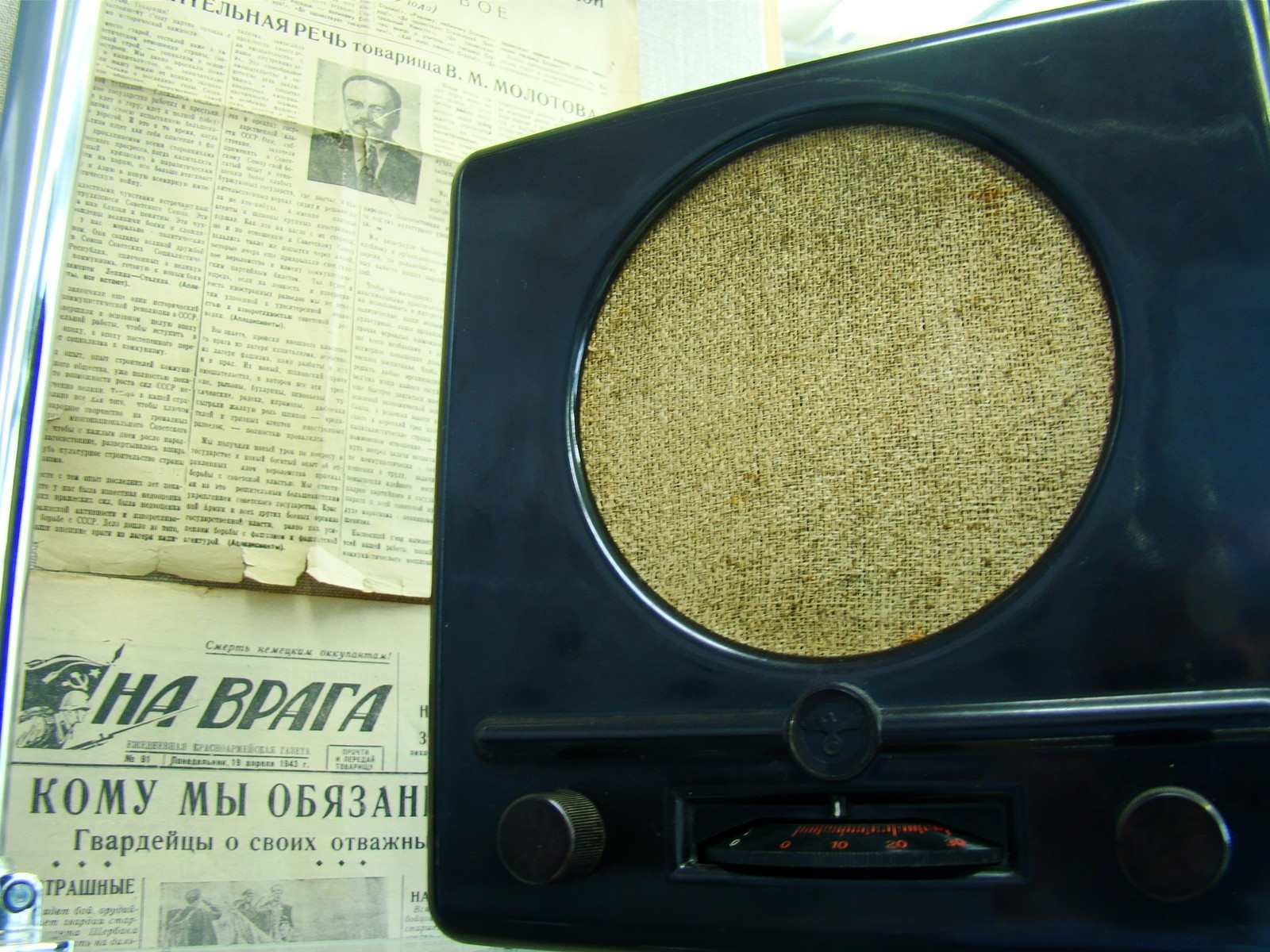

== Location and opening hours ==
- Location: Russian Federation, Taganrog, st. Lesnaya Birzha, 20 b
- Opening hours:
  summer: 9:00 until 17:00
  winter, spring, autumn: Mon-Fri 9:00 until 17:00, Sat 9:00 until 15:00, day off - Sun
