= Feodosia Money Museum =

Currency museum in Feodosia, Crimea

Coordinates: 45°1′49.68″N 35°22′48.12″E

Feodosia Museum of Money
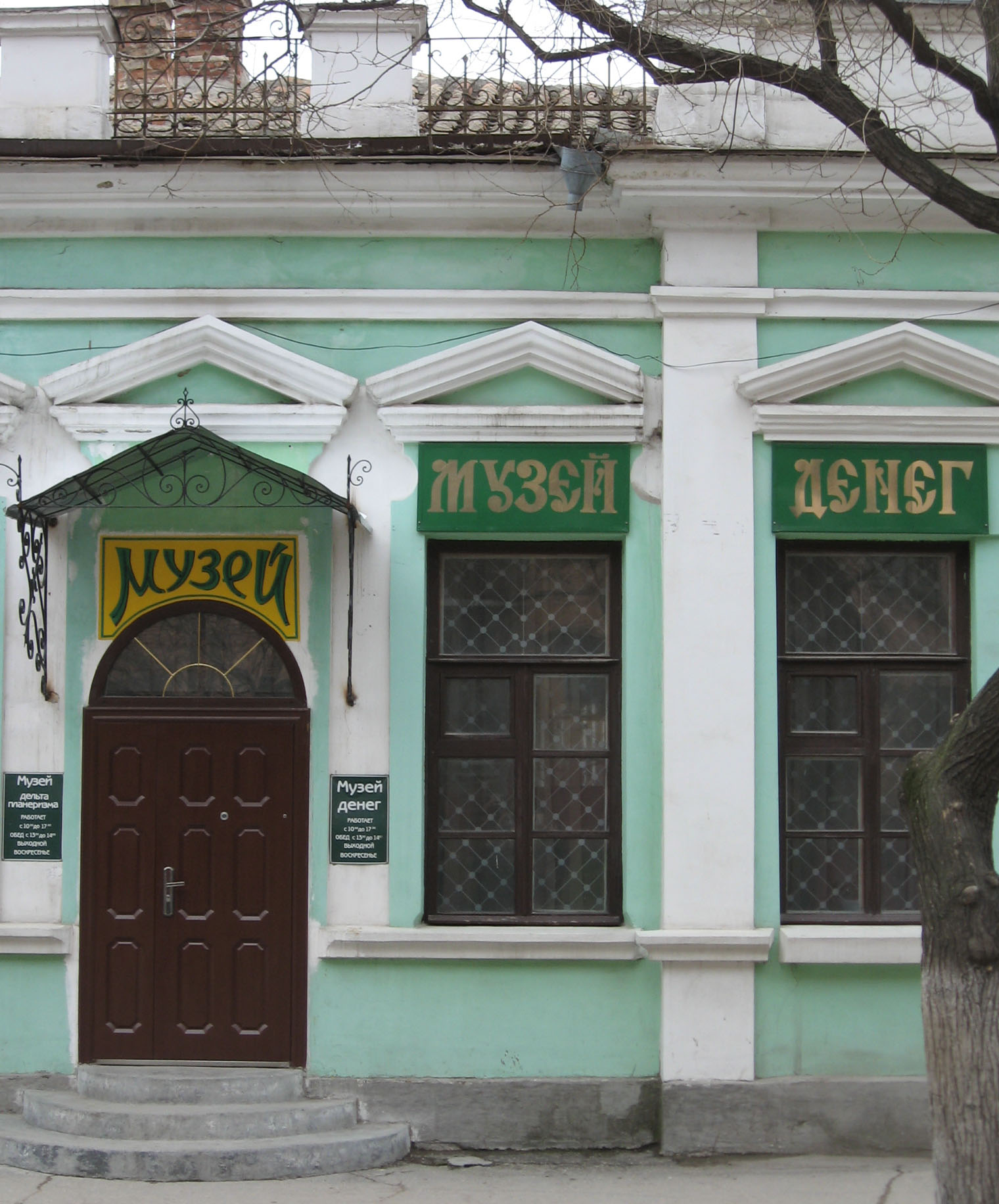
- Established: July 15, 2003
- Location: 12, Kuybysheva Street, Feodosia, Crimea
- Type: Currency Museum
- Director: Oleksandr Oleschuk
- Website: Feodosia Museum of Money

The Feodosia Museum of Money (Russian: Феодосийский музей денег) is a currency museum in Feodosia, Crimea. It was established on July 15, 2003. The opening ceremony took place on August 22, 2003.

The activities of the Feodosia Museum of Money are aimed at the study and popularization of the knowledge relating to coin-striking in Feodosia.

== Collection ==
July 31, 2005 saw the solemn inauguration of the so-called “safe-room” in the Feodosia Museum of Money. On display in this room is money minted and printed in Feodosia from antiquity up to the present day, along with the currency samples that used to be in circulation throughout Ukraine and the Crimea for 2,000 years as well as auxiliary objects.

Besides, this exhibition hall highlights the history of banking from its early days on citing the example of Feodosia where banking dates back to antiquity.

There is a virtual Museum of Money covering the history of money circulation both in Ukraine and worldwide.
