= Nevyansk Icon Museum =

Private museum of icons in Russia

The Nevyansk Icon Museum (Russian: Музей «Невьянская икона») in Yekaterinburg, Russia, is a private museum of icons in Russia. More than 300 Nevyansk icons of the 18th to the 20th centuries are on display there. Entrance is free for everyone.

The museum was opened in 1999 by Yevgeny Roizman. According to Chief Curator Maksim Borovik, in its first five years, more than 200,000 persons visited it. The main purpose of the museum is to save the phenomenon of the Nevyansk icon.

== History ==
The Nevyansk icon is documented as having existed from 1734 (the icon "Our Lady of Egypt"), until 1919 ("The Saviour Pantocrator"). In fact there are even earlier Nevyansk icons in the museum, and the last secret icon painters appear to have existed in 1950. The phenomenon that is called "High Nevyansk" practically didn't outlast the end of the 18th century.

With the accession of Alexander I of Russia, the spread of the Common Faith and industrial development in the Urals, Nevyansk icon painting had a new birth. Having orders from rich factory owners, tax farmers and owners of goldmines, Nevyansk masters of Bogatirev's dynasty created magnificent masterpieces until the late 1830s, but the original, authentic, strict Nevyansk icons remained in the 18th century.

=== Origin of name ===
In the 18th century Nevyansk (Ural mountains) was a small Old Believers' center. There were just a few workshops there, the experience of icon painting had been only 100 years. Life wasn't so easy for icon painters: regular roundups, searches. The masters hid in skits. They didn't paint to sell, only when they had orders (if there wasn't any, they didn't paint at all). People respected icon painters, all of them were literate. Their customers were literate too, they were sophisticated and very rich Old Believers. They knew what they wanted to get for their money. Besides all of them were sincere believers and they were ready to do everything for their faith. That's why appeared the phenomenon "Nevyansk icon". There isn't a great quantity of Nevyansk icons, but each of them is a precious treasure. Sometimes the museum takes icons which cannot be restored, only for the last fragments.

=== Expositions ===
The first exposition of the museum was in May, 2005 in Feropontovo. Then there was another exposition of the icons in Yaroslavl.

=== General information ===
Chief curator: Maksim Borovik

Address: Yekaterinbourg, 15 Engelsa str.

Contacts: +7(343) 220 66 50

web-site: iconmuseum.ru

Open: from 11 AM till 8 PM

Free entrance
