= Turukhan Airlines =

Russian airline based in Krasnoyarsk

Turukhan Aviation Авиакомпания «Турухан»
IATA	ICAO	Call sign
—	TRH	TURUKHAN
- Founded: 1997
- Fleet size: 38
- Headquarters: Krasnoyarsk, Russia
- Website: turuhanavia.ru

LLC Turukhan Airlines (Russian: ООО Авиакомпания "Турухан") is an airline based in Krasnoyarsk, Russia. It is banned from flying in the EU.

== History ==
Established in 1997 as a subsidiary of Yeniseyskij Meridian airlines, it became independent in 2001. It operates regional scheduled and charter services in Siberian Federal District. In 2015, Turukhan Airlines received the fleet of Katekavia. In 2017, Turukhan Airlines operated 8,743 flights and transported 256,835 passengers.

== Fleet ==
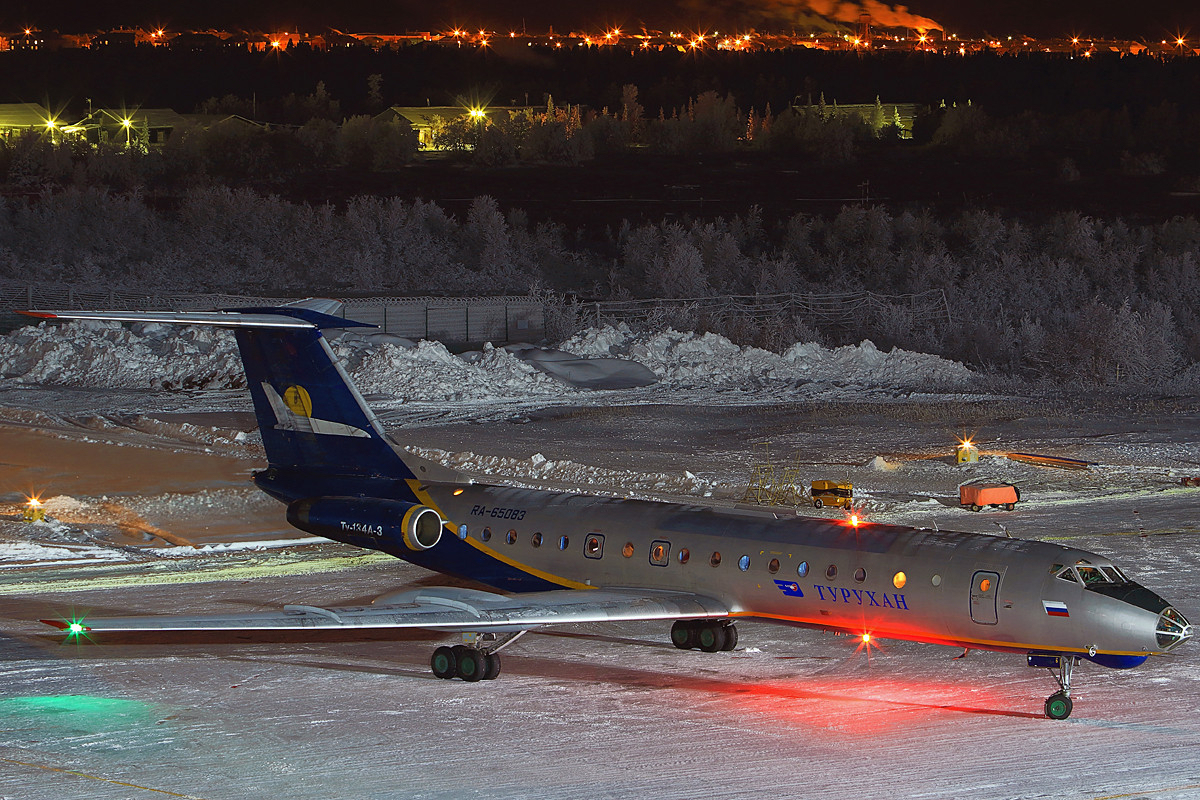
Turukhan Airlines Tupolev Tu-134A

As of July 2019, the Turukhan Airlines fleet includes the following aircraft:

Aircraft	Total	Passengers	Notes
Antonov An-24RV	6	48	
Tupolev Tu-134A	2	84	
Yakovlev Yak-42	13	100	
Mil Mi-8/9/17/18/19/171/172	15	var.	
Total	23		
