= Igarka =

Town in Krasnoyarsk Krai, Russia

Igarka Игарка
- Town
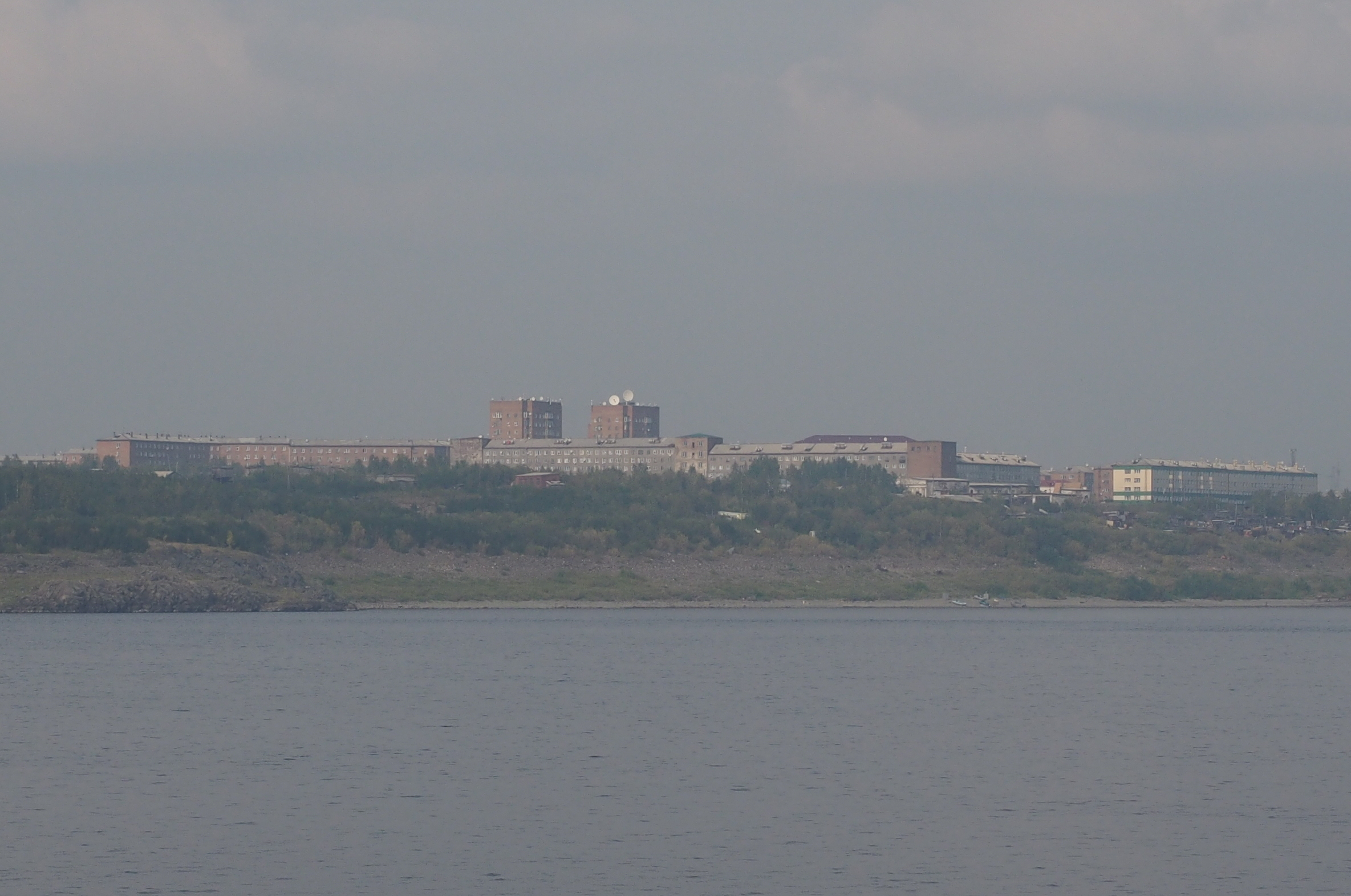
- Igarka from the Yenesei River

- Flag Coat of arms
- Interactive map of Igarka
- Location of Igarka Igarka (Krasnoyarsk Krai)
- Coordinates: 67°28′N 86°35′E
- Country: Russia
- Federal subject: Krasnoyarsk Krai
- Administrative district: Turukhansky District
- District townSelsoviet: Igarka
- Founded: 1929
- Town status since: 1931
- Elevation: 20 m (66 ft)

Population (2010 Census)
  - Total: 6,183
  - Estimate (2024): 3,559 (−42.4%)

Administrative status
  - Capital of: District town of Igarka

Municipal status
  - Municipal district: Turukhansky Municipal District
  - Urban settlement: Igarka Urban Settlement
  - Capital of: Igarka Urban Settlement
- Time zone: UTC+7 (MSK+4)
- Postal code: 663200
- OKTMO ID: 04654117001
- Website: igarkacity.info

Igarka (Russian: Ига́рка) is a town in Turukhansky District of Krasnoyarsk Krai, Russia, located 163 kilometers (101 mi) north of the Arctic Circle. Igarka is a monotown established around a sawmill which processed timber logged in the basin of the Yenisei River for export. Up to 1956, it was largely inhabited by deportees and political prisoners. Since the dissolution of the Soviet Union in 1991, the town's population has rapidly declined – it decreased from 18,820 (1989 Soviet census) to 4,417 (2019).

== History ==
Igarka was founded in 1929 as a sawmill and a timber-exporting port by the Chief Directorate of the Northern Sea Route. Timber was logged in the basin of the Yenisei River, floated to Igarka where it was processed, and then exported to various distribution centers. The town grew rapidly as deportees during the dekulakization campaigns were sent to the town. Igarka was granted city status in 1931. The town's construction was directed by Boris Lavrov who envisioned Igarka as an ideal Soviet Arctic city. In 1939, the town reached its peak population of 23,648. Further development was suspended due to World War II, but resumed in the late 1940s when Igarka was envisioned as a naval port.

From 1949 to 1953, the Salekhard–Igarka Railway project made an unsuccessful attempt to connect Igarka to the Russian railway network at Salekhard, which killed thousands of Gulag prisoners. During the deportations of 1948–1951, thousands of civilians were deported to Igarka from the newly occupied territories of the Soviet Union. Some 6,000 to 10,000 Lithuanians were deported during the Operation Spring in May 1948 alone. About 1,000–3,000 of them died from the cold and poor conditions in the first year.

After the death of Stalin in 1953, the Salekhard–Igarka Railway project was abandoned and many deportees were allowed to return home. However, the town recovered and by 1965 it was the second largest lumber-exporting port in the Soviet Union. During this era, the town saw construction of typical concrete housing blocks. After the dissolution of the Soviet Union in 1991, the sawmill was not viable in the new free-market environment due to the high costs associated with the harsh climate conditions and long distances to the buyers. The sawmill closed in 2000 leading to the rapid decline in the town's population. Increasing mean annual air temperatures led to permafrost thaw which destabilized and structurally impaired many buildings in the town. To reduce maintenance and utility costs of such buildings, the town demolished and controlled burned the historic district of mainly wooden houses in the mid-2000s. The residents were relocated to the newer apartment blocks.

== Geography ==
=== Climate ===
Igarka has a subarctic climate (Köppen climate classification: Dfc)

Climate data for Igarka, 1991–2020 normals, extremes 1929–present
Month	Jan	Feb	Mar	Apr	May	Jun	Jul	Aug	Sep	Oct	Nov	Dec	Year
Record high °C (°F)	1.2 (34.2)	0.7 (33.3)	7.2 (45.0)	13.3 (55.9)	27.8 (82.0)	33.6 (92.5)	34.0 (93.2)	31.3 (88.3)	24.8 (76.6)	14.6 (58.3)	3.1 (37.6)	1.0 (33.8)	34.0 (93.2)
Mean daily maximum °C (°F)	−23.2 (−9.8)	−20.1 (−4.2)	−10.4 (13.3)	−2.7 (27.1)	4.2 (39.6)	16.5 (61.7)	21.2 (70.2)	17.1 (62.8)	9.1 (48.4)	−2.6 (27.3)	−16.1 (3.0)	−21.0 (−5.8)	−2.3 (27.8)
Daily mean °C (°F)	−27.2 (−17.0)	−24.7 (−12.5)	−16.4 (2.5)	−9.0 (15.8)	−0.6 (30.9)	10.9 (51.6)	15.6 (60.1)	12.3 (54.1)	5.3 (41.5)	−5.7 (21.7)	−20.1 (−4.2)	−24.9 (−12.8)	−7.0 (19.3)
Mean daily minimum °C (°F)	−31.5 (−24.7)	−29.1 (−20.4)	−21.7 (−7.1)	−14.7 (5.5)	−4.8 (23.4)	6.2 (43.2)	10.7 (51.3)	8.3 (46.9)	2.3 (36.1)	−8.5 (16.7)	−24.1 (−11.4)	−29.1 (−20.4)	−11.3 (11.6)
Record low °C (°F)	−55.2 (−67.4)	−54.8 (−66.6)	−51.8 (−61.2)	−42.8 (−45.0)	−29.1 (−20.4)	−9.0 (15.8)	−0.7 (30.7)	−3.9 (25.0)	−14.3 (6.3)	−38.9 (−38.0)	−49.5 (−57.1)	−55.5 (−67.9)	−55.5 (−67.9)
Average precipitation mm (inches)	34 (1.3)	31 (1.2)	35 (1.4)	34 (1.3)	36 (1.4)	57 (2.2)	52 (2.0)	71 (2.8)	56 (2.2)	64 (2.5)	49 (1.9)	45 (1.8)	564 (22)
Source: www.pogodaiklimat.ru

== Demographics ==
Historical population
Year	Pop.	±%
1939	23,648	—
1959	14,311	−39.5%
1970	15,624	+9.2%
1979	16,335	+4.6%
1989	18,820	+15.2%
2002	8,627	−54.2%
2010	6,183	−28.3%
2021	3,634	−41.2%
Source: Censuses

Population: 4,417 (2019); 6,183 (2010 census); 8,627 (2002 census); 18,820 (1989 Soviet census); 16,000 (1970); 14,311 (1959); 23,649 (1939). Igarka is a monotown, a town whose economy is dominated by a single industry. Its population rapidly declined after the dissolution of the Soviet Union and after the closure of the main sawmill in 2000.

Before the collapse of the Soviet Union, the town was predominantly populated by Lithuanians, Germans, Russians, Tatars and Poles. When the Soviet Union fell apart many of these people returned to their respective countries, turning the entire area into an entirely Slavic one populated by Russians, Ukrainians and Belarusians.

== Administrative and municipal status ==
Within the framework of administrative divisions, it is incorporated within Turukhansky District as the district town of Igarka. As a municipal division, the district town of Igarka is incorporated within Turukhansky Municipal District as Igarka Urban Settlement.

== Transportation ==
The town is located north of the Arctic Circle and is built on permafrost. Though it is situated inland, Igarka is a deep water port situated on the east bank of the Yenisei River and provides access to the Northern Sea Route. It located 673 kilometers (418 mi) from the Yenisei's mouth.

It is served by Igarka Airport, whose location on an island in the middle of the river makes access difficult when the water is partly thawed: in winter one can drive across, and in summer there is a boat connection.

== Culture ==
The town's main attraction is the Permafrost Museum which has won some pan-European prizes. The museum is located in the former geocryological lab founded in 1930 by the Siberian Branch of the Academy of Sciences of the Soviet Union. A year later, an underground permafrost research station was established. Several shafts were excavated by hand in late 1930s and early 1940s extending as far as 14 meters into the permafrost. Research in these facilities led to the development of building foundations specifically adapted to the permafrost.

== Notable people ==
- Oleh Polischuk (born 1991), professional footballer
