= Zimin (surname) =

Zimin (Russian: Зимин, from zima meaning winter) is a Russian masculine surname, its feminine counterpart is Zimina. It may refer to

- Semyon Grigorievich Zimin (1740-1860), Russian entrepreneur
- Aleksandr Zimin (1920–1980), Russian historian
- Alexei Zimin (1971–2024), Russian chef
- Anna Zimina (born 1939), Soviet middle-distance runner
- Dmitry Zimin (1933–2021), Russian entrepreneur
- Ilya Zimin (1972–2006), Russian TV reporter
- Ivan Zimin, Russian industrialist
- Jim Zimin (1902–1974), Russian-born Australian farmer
- Nikolai Zimin (1895–1938), Soviet politician
- Olga Zimina (born 1982), Russian-Italian chess player
- Sergei Zimin (1870–1945), Russian entrepreneur and founder of the Zimin Opera
- Valentina Zimina (1899–1928), Russian silent screen actress
- Viktor Zimin (politician) (born 1962), Russian politician
- Viktor Zimin (football coach) (born 1950), Russian football coach
- Yevgeni Zimin (1947–2018), Russian hockey player
- Yulia Zimina (born 1981), Russian film actress and TV presenter

== See also ==
- Zemina (surname)
- Zemin (given name)
- Ziming, a given name
