= Bakhrushin Museum =

Theatre museum in Moscow, Russia

A. A. Bakhrushin State Central Theatre Museum
- Государственный Центральный театральный музей им. А. А. Бахрушина
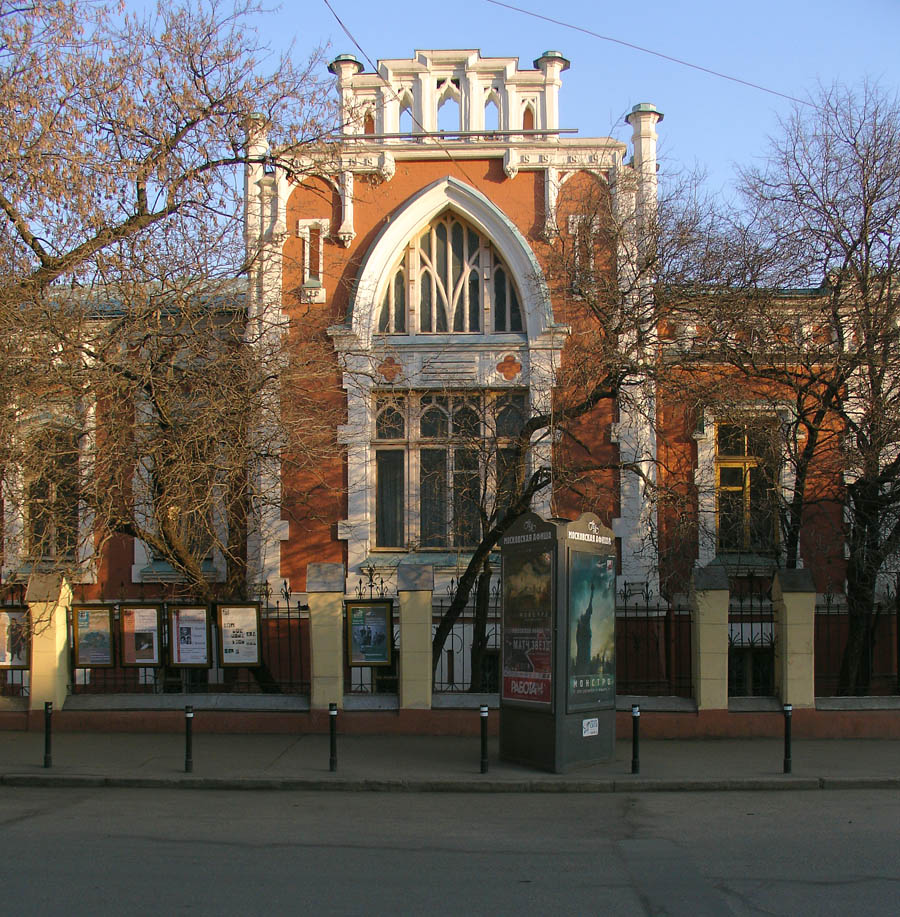
- A. A. Bakhrushin state Central Theatre Museum.

- Location within Moscow
- Established: 1894
- Location: Moscow
- Coordinates: 55°43′54″N 37°38′16″E
- Collection size: 1,500,000+
- Founder: Alexey Bakhrushin
- Director: Dmitriy Rodionov
- Architect: Karl Gippius
- Website: Official website

A. A. Bakhrushin State Central Theatre Museum (abbreviated as SCTM. A. A. Bakhrushin, the Bakhrushin Museum, the former Literary-Theatrical Museum of the Imperial Academy of Sciences Russian: Государственный Центральный Театральный Музей им. А.А.Бахрушина, also known as ГЦТМ им. А.А.Бахрушина) is a museum in Moscow dedicated to the theatre. It was founded in 1894 by the Russian merchant, and philanthropist Alexey Alexandrovich Bakhrushin. The Great Soviet Encyclopedia characterises it as the largest theatre museum in the world.

== History ==
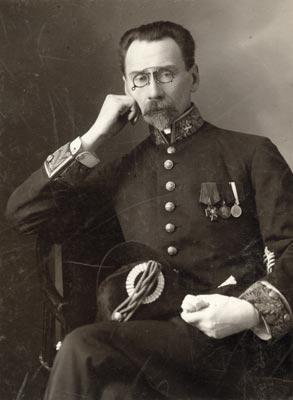
Alexey Alexandrovich Bakhrushin, founder of the museum

In search of exhibits, Alexey Alexandrovich Bakhrushin repeatedly made long trips to Russia, from which he brought not only theatre rarities, but also works of folk art, furniture, and traditional Russian costumes. In the early 20th century Bakhrushin made three trips to improve the sections on the history of Western theatre. One of the main sources of enlargement of the museum's collection was through gifts.

The museum's founding day is considered to be 29 October 1894, when Bakhrushin first presented his collection for public inspection. In 1913, on November 25, the museum was transferred to the Academy of sciences with the condition of leaving it in Moscow, and in 1917 the museum was included in the network of state institutions, and in 1918 Alexei Bakhrushin — at the suggestion of Vladimir Lenin — was appointed the life director of the museum.

Until 1917, the museum was visited by about 300-400 people a year, then much more. By 1917, the museum had about twelve thousand exhibits. The museum funds were actively replenished in Soviet times, in 1949, they numbered 314 thousand units of storage, and in the 1990s-more than one million exhibits.

In 2014 the state theatre Museum named after him. A. A. Bakhrushin in connection with the 120th anniversary of the preservation of the history of the emergence and formation of domestic and foreign theatre was awarded the silver order of "Audience sympathy".

== Museum ==
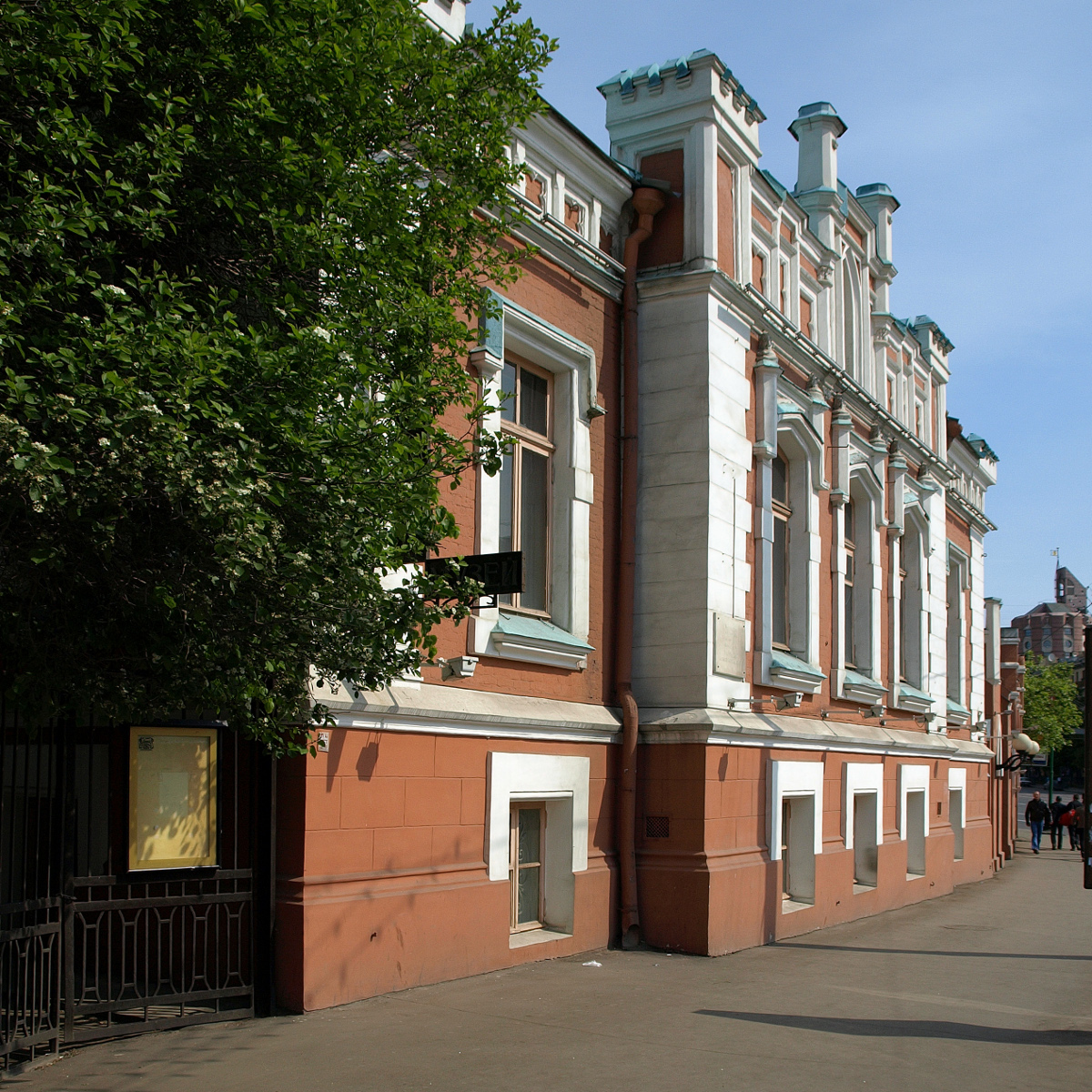
Main building of the museum, the view from the garden ring

The museum is located in the former manor house of A. A. Bakhrushin in Zamoskvorechye District. The main building, a one-storey mansion in English Gothic style, was built in 1896.

== Archival and manuscript department ==
The archive and manuscript department of the museum is a unique collection of documentary monuments to the history of the national theatre, from the 18th century to the present day.

== Department of decorative and visual materials ==
The museum's collection of decorative and pictorial materials consists of sketches of costumes and scenery; picturesque, graphic, and sculptural portraits of theatrical figures; images of theatre buildings, actors, and theatrical performances; cartoons and caricatures; and models of scenery.

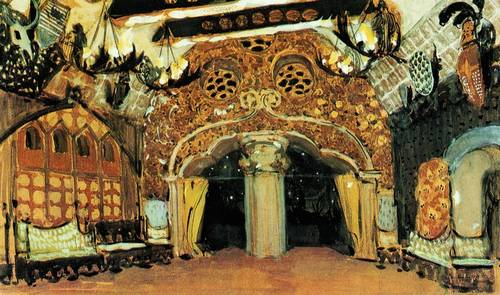
Alexander Golovin. Sketch of the scenery for the ballet by Tchaikovsky Swan Lake. 1901

Are creations of eminent artists working in the theatre: Pietro Gonzaga, Ivan Bilibin, N. Roerich, Fyodor Fedorovsky, Aleksandr Golovin, Mikhail Vrubel, Alexandre Benois, Léon Bakst, Konstantin Korovin, Boris Anisfeld, Aleksandra Ekster, Natalia Goncharova, Mstislav Dobuzhinsky, Robert Falk, Vladimir Tatlin, Alexander Tyshler, Boris Kustodiev, Konstantin Yuon, Nathan Altman, Aristarkh Lentulov, Yuri Annenkov, Nikolai Akimov, Sergei Eisenstein, Alexander Rodchenko, Pyotr Williams, Boris Messerer, Valery Levental, Eduard Kochergin and others.

== Department of photo-negative documents ==
The Department of photo-negative documents includes photos of scenes from performances (drama, Opera, ballet, operetta); portraits of actors (in life and in roles), writers, playwrights, directors, artists, entrepreneurs and other theatre figures; group portraits; pictures of theatre buildings inside and outside. Described imperial theatres: Bolshoi Theatre, Mariinsky Theatre, Maly Theatre and Alexandrinsky Theatre, Moscow art theatre (Chekhov) and Moscow Art Theatre (as well as the Society of lovers of art and literature and Alexis circle), Studio Art theatre (1st, 2nd, 3rd, 4th), Habima Theatre, Zimin Opera, Moscow private Russian Opera Private Opera Mamontov; other pre-revolutionary private theatres and repertory: Korsh Theatre, entreprise Sukhodil'ski, in particular, provincial: Kharkov repertory company under the direction of N. Sinelnikov, Solovtsov theatre, Moscow Free theatre, the Soviet (State theatre Vsevolod Meyerhold, Moscow chamber theatre) and modern theatres.

== Department of posters and programmes ==
The Department of posters and programmes contains more than 600 thousand units. It is based on posters of the imperial and private theatres, collected by the founder of the museum, Alexei Alexandrovich Bakhrushin.

Decoration poster of the Fund were art posters and programmes made by famous artists: A. Y. Golovin, Ivan Bilibin, L. Bakst, K. Somov, S. Sudeikin, A. M. and V. M. Vasnetsova, artists of Russian avant-garde: H. A. and V. A. Stenberg, Nathan Altman, V. M. Khodasevich, Yu. p. Annenkov and others.

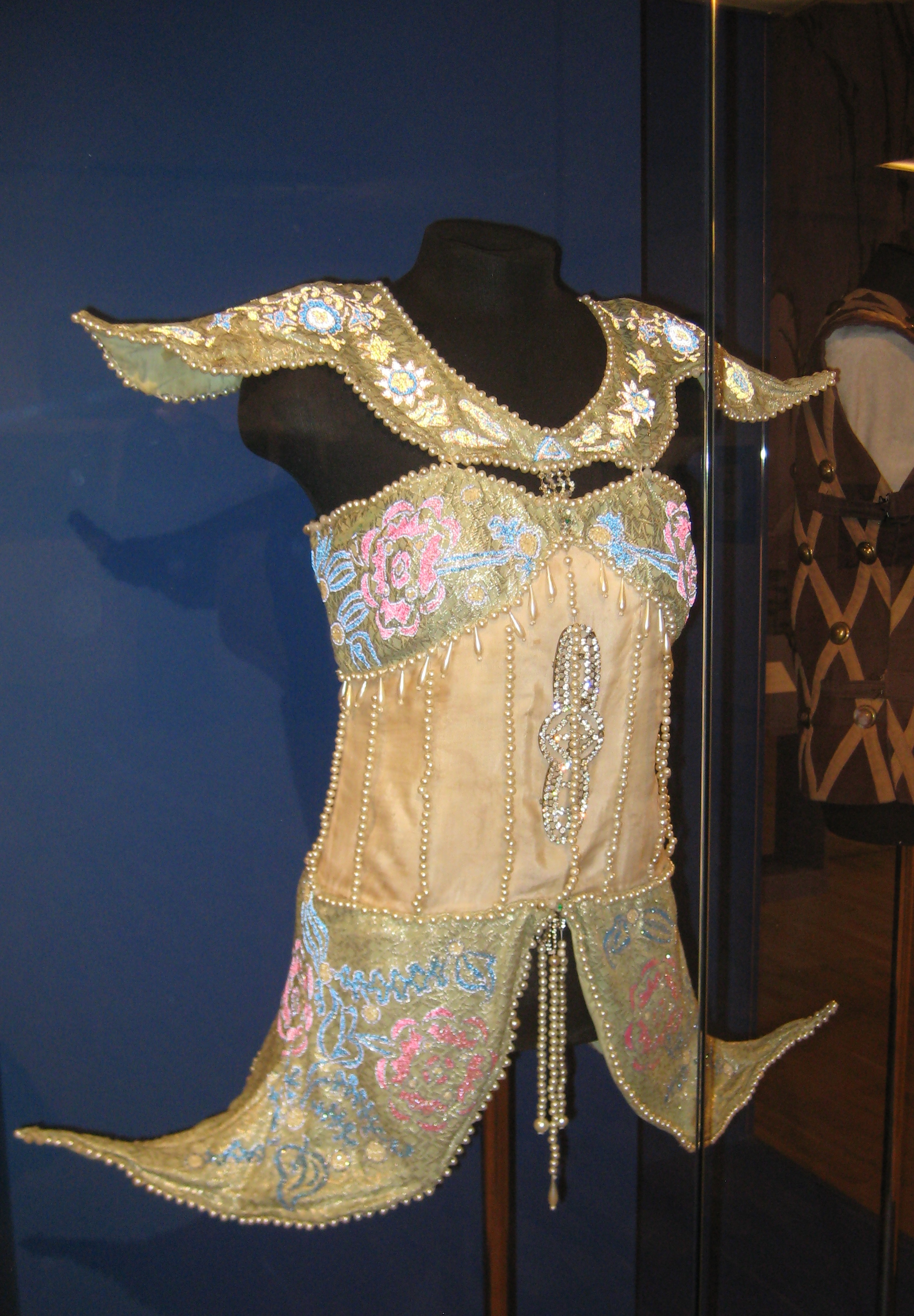
Costume based on the sketch Konstantin Korovin to Opera N. Rimsky-Korsakov the Golden Cockerel. One thousand nine hundred thirty four

== Department memorial Foundation glove ==
The basis of the Department of the memorial and clothing Fund is a collection collected by the founder of the museum, A. A. Bakhrushin.

== Video, sound and film Department ==
It houses a collection of gramophone and long-playing records on Russian and foreign Opera music, a collection of magnetic phonograms, film and video materials, audio cassettes and CDs. The basis of the museum collection of records is a collection donated to the museum in 1982 by the collector I. F. Boyarsky.

The formation of the collection of video materials began with the translation of film documents into video for the sake of their preservation. Among the materials that were primarily translated into video documents relating to the work of V. E. Meyerhold, K. S. Stanislavsky, A. ya. Tairov, S. I. mihoels; rare films relating to the life and work of the creators and artists of the Moscow art theatre; film materials about the activities of the Moscow art theatre-2, depicting one of the most outstanding actors of the Russian theatre Mikhail Chekhov; miraculously surviving footage with excerpts from performances of Chamber theatre, posed by A. Y. Tairov with the participation of A. G. Koonen and fragments of rehearsals and performances of the State Jewish theatre with the participation of Solomon Mikhoels.

== Library (book Fund Department) ==
The book collection of the museum is formed on the basis of the personal library of the museum founder, Alexey Alexandrovich Bakhrushin.

== Department of children's and puppet theatre funds ==
It was created on January 1, 2008, on the basis of the materials of the former state Museum of children's theatres, transferred to the SCTM. AA Bakhrushin on the orders of the Ministry of Culture (Russia) No. 1084 dated 6 August 2003 are working to reconcile the materials and putting them on record in state Central theatre Museum im. A. A. Bakhrushin.

== The branches of the museum ==
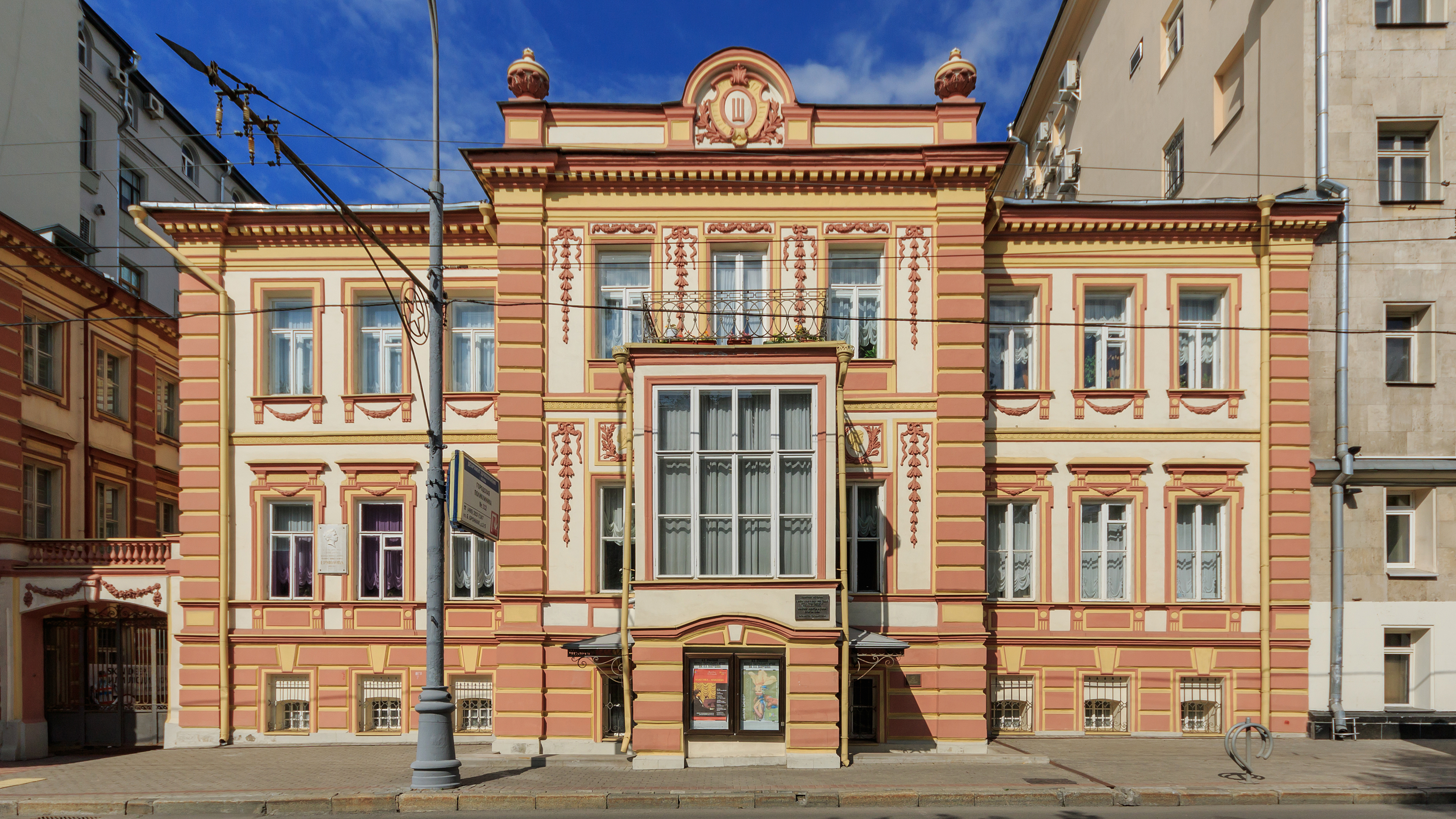
the House-Museum of M. N. Yermolova on the Tverskoy Boulevard

In addition to the main building, the state Central Theatre Museum named after A. A. Bakhrushin has nine branches. These are memorial houses and apartments of outstanding figures of the Russian theatre and exhibition hall:

- The house-Museum of Ostrovsky House-Museum Alexander Ostrovsky
- The house-Museum of Mikhail Shchepkin
- The house-Museum of Maria Yermolova
- The apartment-Museum of Vsevolod Meyerhold
- Museum-flat acting family Maria Mironov, Andrei Mironov — Alexander Menaker
- The Museum-apartment of Valentin Pluchek
- The Museum-flat of Galina Ulanova
- Memorial Museum "Creative workshop of a theatre artist David Borovsky"
- Theatrical gallery on Malaya Ordynka

== Publishing ==
Publishing Department the museum has produced a number of scientific and popular science publications, whose main goal — the promotion of the artistic heritage and scientific potential of the state Central theatre Museum im. A. A. Bakhrushin, as well as a reflection of the modern exhibition and exhibition activities of all structural units of the museum.

== Excursions ==
The museum and its branches organise sightseeing and thematic tours for students, schoolchildren, foreign delegations, tourists and other categories of visitors.

- Sightseeing tour " treasures of Bakhrushin Museum»
- Sightseeing tour "the A. A. Bakhrushin theatre and its Museum»
- Thematic tour " Versailles on a Hook. The architectural image of the house. Theatre rarities»
- Thematic tour " what the portraits are talking about»
- Thematic tour for children "We go to the theatre»
- Thematic tour for children " history of ballet shoes»
- Thematic tour "the Secret of the knight of Zamoskvoretsky castle" "the secret of the knight of the castle of Zamoskvorech" (in a foreign language)»
- Walking tour " Zamoskvorechye Bakhrushin. Cold places in the tanners»
