= Irbit =

Town in Sverdlovsk Oblast, Russia

Irbit Ирбит
- Town
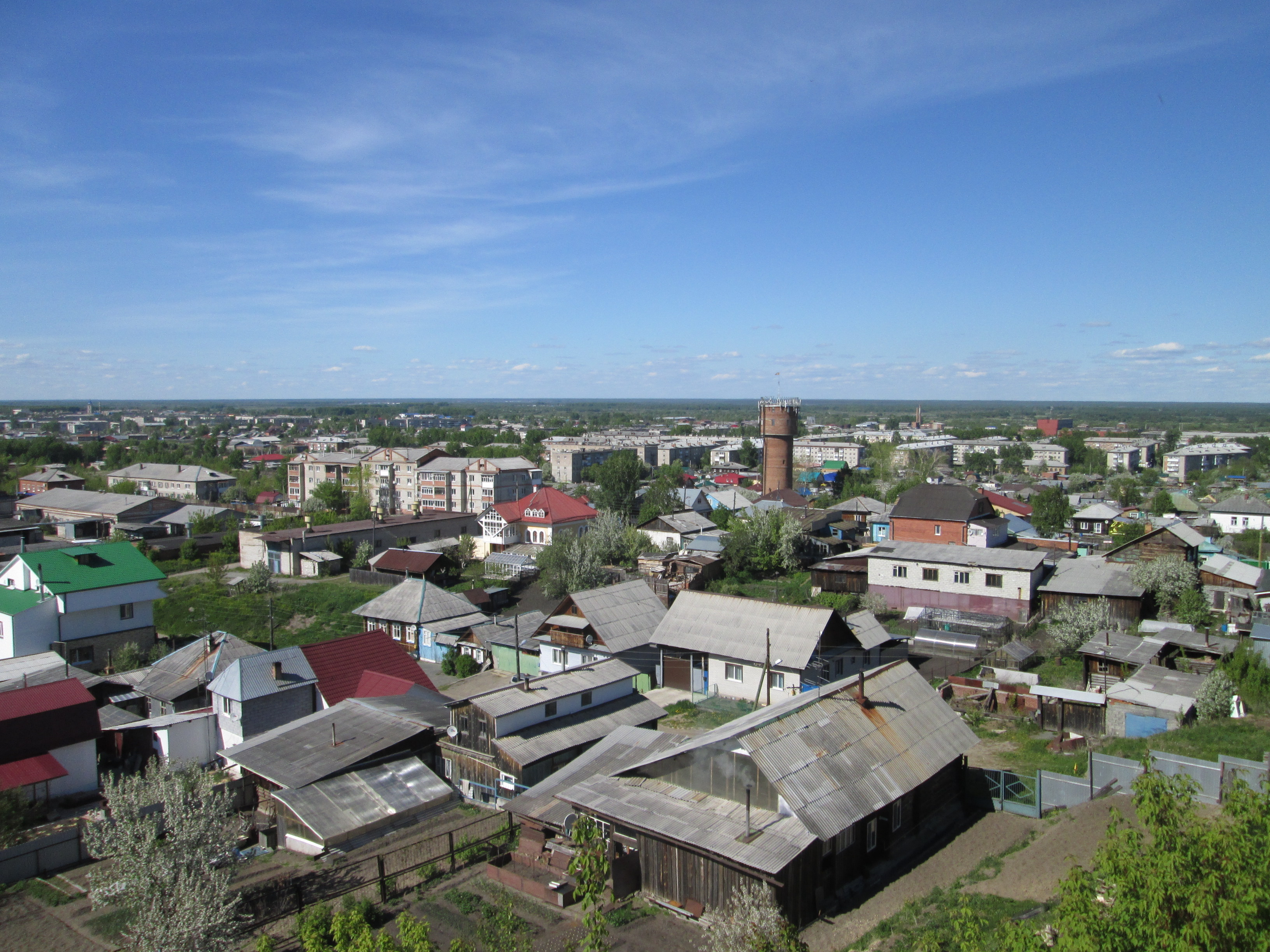
- View of the Loginova neighborhood, 2017

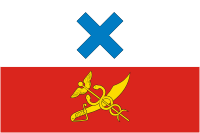
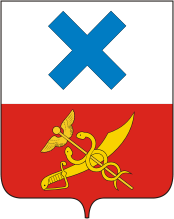
- Flag Coat of arms
- Interactive map of Irbit
- Location of Irbit Irbit (Sverdlovsk Oblast)
- Coordinates: 57°40′N 63°04′E
- Country: Russia
- Federal subject: Sverdlovsk Oblast
- Founded: 1631
- Town status since: 1775
- Elevation: 80 m (260 ft)

Population (2010 Census)
  - Total: 38,357
  - Estimate (2025): 36,178 (−5.7%)

Administrative status
  - Subordinated to: Town of Irbit
  - Capital of: Irbitsky District, Town of Irbit

Municipal status
  - Urban okrug: Irbit Urban Okrug
  - Capital of: Irbit Urban Okrug
- Time zone: UTC+5 (MSK+2)
- Postal code: 623850
- Dialing code: +7 34355
- OKTMO ID: 65739000001

Irbit (Russian: Ирби́т) is a town in Sverdlovsk Oblast, Russia, located 203 kilometers (126 mi) from Yekaterinburg by train or 250 kilometers (160 mi) by car, on the right bank of the Nitsa. Population: 37,009 (2021 census); 38,357 (2010 census); 43,318 (2002 census); 51,708 (1989 Soviet census).

It was previously known as Irbeyevskaya Sloboda (until 1662).

== History ==
Founded in 1631 as Irbeyevskaya Sloboda (Ирбе́евская слобода́), its name was changed in 1662 to Irbit. It was granted official town status by Catherine the Great in 1775 for the town's loyalty to the Empress during the Pugachev uprising of 1773–1774. In 1776, she awarded the town its official crest.

In the 19th century, the Irbit Fair was an important event for the trade in Siberian fur and Chinese tea.

== Administrative and municipal status ==
Within the framework of the administrative divisions, Irbit serves as the administrative center of Irbitsky District, even though it is not a part of it. As an administrative division, it is incorporated separately as the Town of Irbit—an administrative unit with the status equal to that of the districts. As a municipal division, the Town of Irbit is incorporated as Irbit Urban Okrug.

== Economy ==
After World War II, various branches of industry, such as engineering, manufacturing of construction materials, pharmaceutical, light, and food-manufacturing industries developed rapidly. During the war a motorcycle-manufacturing plant was moved here from Moscow. For more than fifty years, over three million motorcycles had been produced here. The factory now produces only two thousand motorcycles a year, most of which are for export. In the Soviet times, however, hundreds of thousands were produced. Today it produces different types of motorcycles and spare parts for them, specializing in heavy motorcycles with sidecars. Irbit is also the former world headquarters for Russian motorcycle manufacturer Ural Motorcycles. In 2022, the Ural factory moved to Petropavlovsk, Kazakhstan.

Irbit dairy plant is the largest milk-processing plant in the Urals. In 2004, it processed 66,000 tons of milk. Irbit bakery plant manufactures different types of breads and batons, cakes, croutons, toasts. Irbit chemico-pharmaceutical plant produces drugs, chemical substances, fluids for chemical industry.

=== Natural resources ===
Water resources are represented by the Nitsa and Irbit Rivers. Mineral resources include diatomaceous earth and glass-making sand deposits.

=== Transportation ===
The town is crossed by the long distance railway Yekaterinburg–Tavda–Ustye-Akha and by road traffic routes, directed to Kamyshlov, Artyomovsk, Turinsk, and Tyumen.

== Culture ==
The Irbit State Museum of Fine Art contains some important works including etchings by famous European artists. At the moment the museum is the only one in Russia specializing in engravings. In its collection there are engravings by Italian, Dutch, Flemish, German, French, English, Spanish, Swiss, Austrian, Polish, Bulgarian, Belgian, and North American artists. The collection includes works from Albrecht Dürer to Francisco Goya. Russian art is represented by the works of A. F. Zubova, I. A. Sokolova, E. P. Chemesova, Mikhail Dobuzhinsky, Alexander Deyneka, and many others. The domestic collection represents the artists of Yekaterinburg and Nizhny Tagil.

There is also a 200-year-old theater in the town.

Although Irbit no longer attracts as many visitors as it once did, the Irbit State Motorcycle Museum is being built in the town with the intention of bringing foreign motorcycle enthusiasts to the IMZ-Ural motorcycle factory. Each summer thousands of motorcycle enthusiasts come to Irbit from around the world to take part in the Irbit bike show and in the Motocross races.

A public park is located in the northern part of the town.

== Education ==
There are several educational institutions in Irbit. Affiliates of the Ural State Technical University and the Institute of Commerce and Law provide higher education. Motorcycle training college and Agricultural training college, Medical and Pedagogical training schools are facilities of professional education. There are also ten secondary schools and seventeen pre-school institutions.

== Notable people ==
The following people were born in Irbit:

- Serge Timashev, scientist
- Victor Raskin, linguist
- Olga Chernyavskaya, athlete
- Alexander Izgoev, Kadet politician
