= Valeria Barsova =

Russian operatic soprano

Valeria Barsova Валерия Барсова
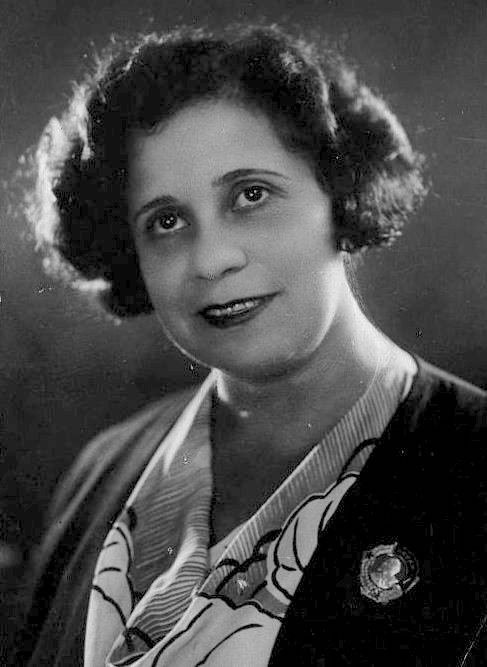
- Barsova in 1938

Background information
- Born: Kaleria Vladimirova; June 13, 1892; Astrakhan, Russian Empire
- Died: December 13, 1967 (aged 75) Sochi, Russian SFSR, Soviet Union
- Occupation: Singer
- Instrument: Singing

Valeria Vladimirovna Barsova (Note: Russian: Валерия Владимировна Барсова, romanized: Valeriya Vladimirovna Barsova) (13 June 1892 – 13 December 1967, born Kaleria Vladimirova), (Note: Russian: Калерия Владимирова, romanized: Kaleriya Vladimirova) PAU, was a Russian operatic soprano, one of the leading lyric-coloratura sopranos of the first half of the 20th century in Russia.

== Life and career ==
Valeria Barsova was born in Astrakhan and first studied the piano with Estonian composer Artur Kapp. She then studied singing at the Moscow Conservatory with Umberto Masetti. In 1915, she was singing in a Moscow cabaret when she was noticed by Sergei Zimin, director of the Zimin Opera, where she made her operatic debut in 1917, as Gilda in Rigoletto. Other roles at this theatre included; Susanna in Le nozze di Figaro, Constance in Die Entführung aus dem Serail, Rosina in Il barbiere di Siviglia, the four heroines of Les contes d'Hoffmann, Nedda in Pagliacci.

In 1919, she sang Rosina as a last minute replacement for prima-donna Antonina Nezhdanova, at the Hermitage Theatre in Saint Petersburg, opposite Feodor Chaliapin. She then appeared at the Stanislavski Theatre and the Nemirovich-Danchenko Theatre, notably as Clairette in La fille de Madame Angot.

She finally made her debut at the Bolshoi Theatre in 1920 where she was to sing every seasons until 1948. Besides Italian and French roles such as Gilda, Violetta, Mimì, Butterfly, Juliette, Manon, she also excelled in Russian operas, notably the leading female roles in works such as Ruslan and Lyudmila, The Snow Maiden, A Life for the Tsar, Sadko, The Queen of Spades, The Golden Cockerel.

In 1929, she sang in concert in Berlin and made a tour of Poland.

After retiring from the stage, she taught at the Moscow Conservatory from 1950 until 1953. She retired in Sochi on the Black Sea, where she died in Sochi at 75.

== Family ==
Her husband was Konstantin Konstantinovich Barsov (1889–1938), a relative of Inna Barsova and head of the bacteriological laboratory at the Rublyovskaya water pumping station. He was arrested in January 1938 in connection with the fabricated "Case of the Counter-Revolutionary Espionage Organization of Microbiologists and Water Supply Workers". He was executed by shooting on 27 September 1938. He was rehabilitated in 1956. His burial place is the Kommunarka execution site.
