= Ziming =

Ziming is the pinyin transcription of various Chinese names. People with these names include:

== Courtesy name ==
- Lü Meng (178–220), Chinese military general
- Sun Liang (243–260), emperor of Eastern Wu
- Yuan Hao (died 529), imperial prince and pretender to the throne of China
- Ren Renfa (1254–1327), Chinese landscape architect, artist and government official
- Lu Tang (ca 1520 – ca 1570), Chinese army officer

== Given name ==
- Ding Ziming (active 1925–1929), Chinese film actor, see list of Chinese films before 1930
- Li Ziming (1903–1993), Chinese martial artist
- Chen Ziming (1952–2014), Chinese dissident
- Doris Yang Ziming, producer of the 1997 film Made in Hong Kong
- Ziming Zhuang, creator of BotSeer in 2007
- Alex Yam Ziming (born 1981), Singaporean politician

== See also ==
- Zhiming, also a Chinese given name
- Zimin (surname), a Russian surname
