= Zemin =

Zemin or Zemīn may refer to

- Zemin (given name), Chinese given name
- Zemin Station, Ningbo Rail Transit

== See also ==
- Zamin (disambiguation)
- Zemina (surname)
- Zemin Seyb, a village in Iran
