= Irbit State Motorcycle Museum =

Museum in Irbit, Sverdlovsk, Russia

- Ирбитский государственный музей мотоциклов
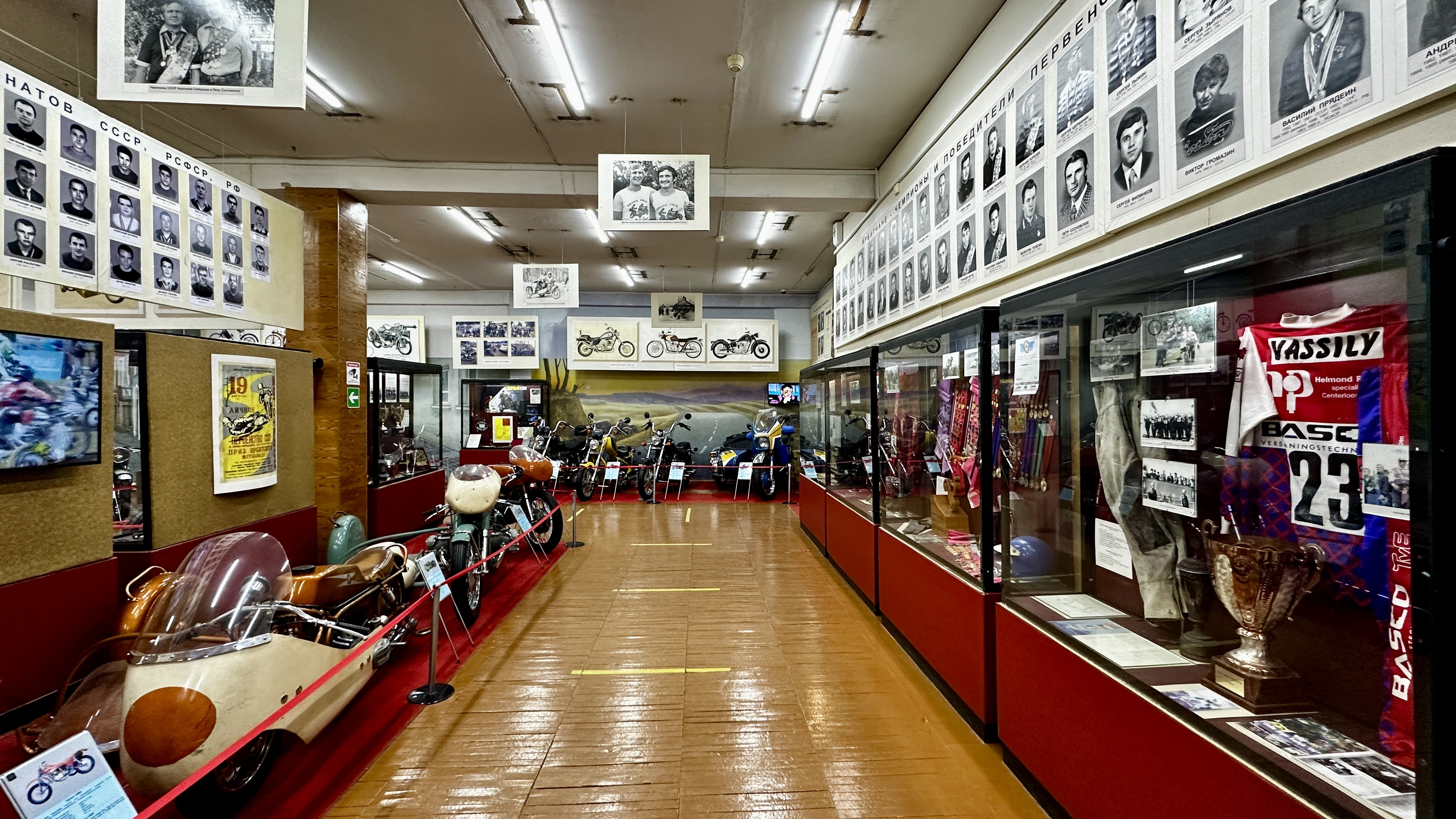
- Former name: Irbit Motorcycle Museum
- Established: 25 June 2004
- Location: Irbit, Sverdlovsk, Russia
- Coordinates: 57°39′46.9″N 63°05′18.4″E
- Type: museum

The Irbit State Motorcycle Museum (Russian: Ирбитский государственный музей мотоциклов) is a museum in Irbit, Sverdlovsk Oblast, Russia. The museum was created as a State Museum of the Russian Federation to protect the former IMZ Factory Museum from sale and dispersal.

== History ==
The museum was officially opened on 25 June 2004 as the Irbit Motorcycle Museum. It received the status of a State Museum of the Russian Federation on 1 January 2006. Its current director is Alexandr Ilyitch Bulanov, a notable historian in the town of Irbit as well as a Guinness Book of Records-holder for Ural motorcycles.

== Architecture ==
It is temporarily housed in a building at 100a Ulitsa Soviestskaya, in Irbit, while a permanent home is built in Ulitsa Lenina.

== Exhibitions ==
The keystone of the museum was the collection of the Design Department of the IMZ factory acquired by local authorities in 2002. The museum contains an extensive collection of production, racing and prototype bikes from the IMZ-Ural Factory as well as many foreign models from a wide range of manufacturers. The collection is unique in its display of the development of the Russian heavy motorcycle.
