= Drezna =

Town in Moscow Oblast, Russia

Drezna Дрезна
- Town
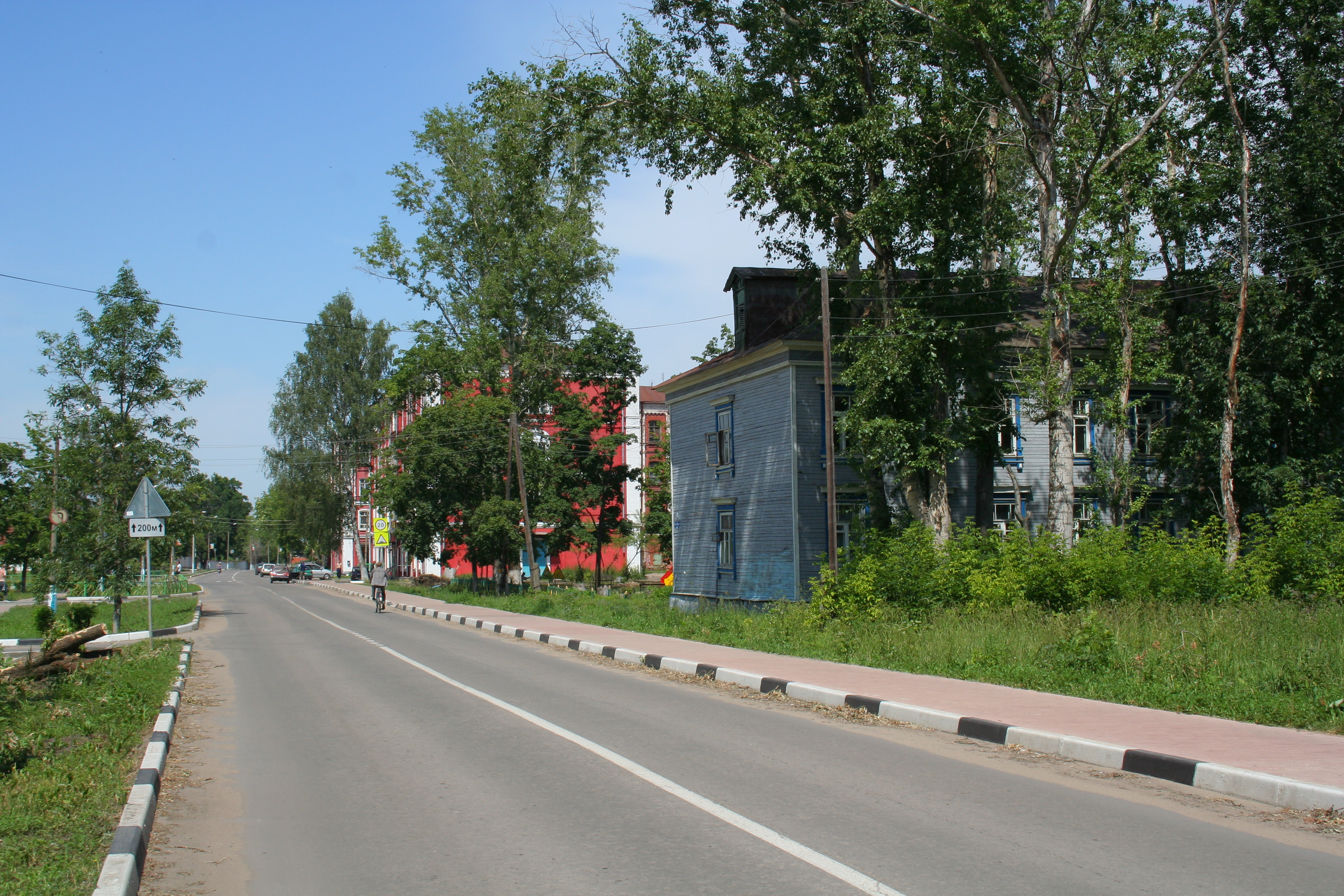
- Residential area in Drezna

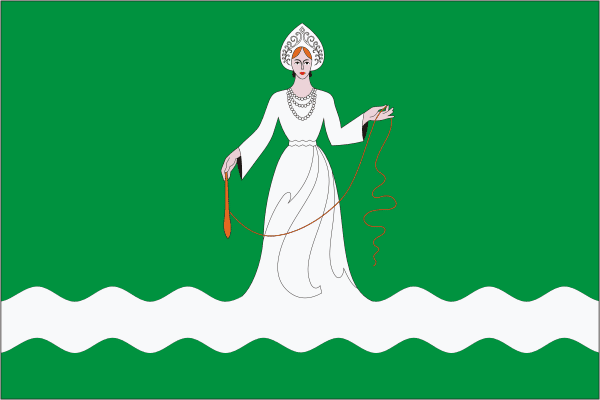
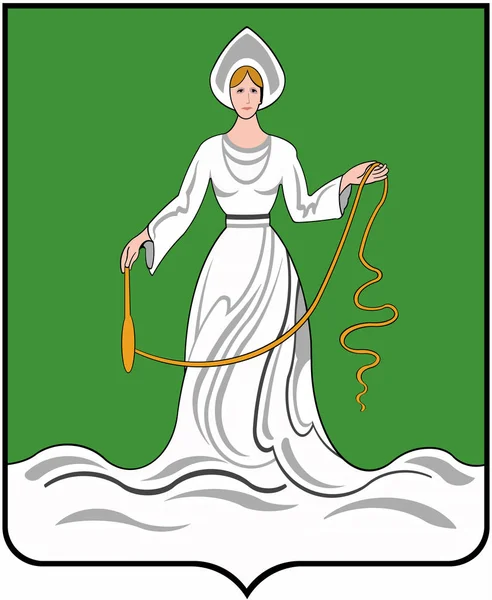
- Flag Coat of arms
- Interactive map of Drezna
- Location of Drezna Drezna (Moscow Oblast)
- Coordinates: 55°44′43″N 38°50′55″E
- Country: Russia
- Federal subject: Moscow Oblast
- Administrative district: Orekhovo-Zuyevsky District
- TownSelsoviet: Drezna
- Founded: 1897
- Town status since: 1940
- Elevation: 125 m (410 ft)

Population (2010 Census)
  - Total: 11,820
  - Estimate (2024): 12,206 (+3.3%)

Administrative status
  - Capital of: Town of Drezna

Municipal status
  - Municipal district: Orekhovo-Zuyevsky Municipal District
  - Urban settlement: Drezna Urban Settlement
  - Capital of: Drezna Urban Settlement
- Time zone: UTC+3 (MSK)
- Postal code: 142660
- OKTMO ID: 46757000006
- Website: www.drezna-adm.ru

Drezna (Russian: Дрезна́) is a town in Orekhovo-Zuyevsky District of Moscow Oblast, Russia, located on the river Drezna (Klyazma's tributary) 83 kilometers (52 mi) east of Moscow. Population: 11,820 (2010 census); 11,665 (2002 census); 13,047 (1989 Soviet census).

== History ==
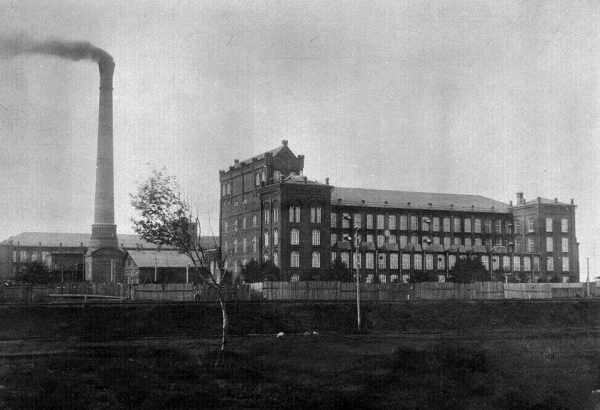
Factory built by Ivan Zimin

It was founded by Ivan Zimin in 1897 as a mill town. It was named after the Drezna River. The mill utilised machinery supplied by Howard & Bullough for spinning and by Platt Brothers for weaving. Drezna was granted town status in 1940.

== Administrative and municipal status ==
Within the framework of administrative divisions, it is incorporated within Orekhovo-Zuyevsky District as the Town of Drezna. As a municipal division, the Town of Drezna is incorporated within Orekhovo-Zuyevsky Municipal District as Drezna Urban Settlement.
