= Zhiming =

- Chinese: 志明
- Cantonese Yale: Jimìhng
- Hanyu Pinyin: Zhìmíng
Transcriptions
Standard Mandarin
- Hanyu Pinyin: Zhìmíng
Yue: Cantonese
- Yale Romanization: Jimìhng

Zhiming is the Mandarin Pinyin spelling of a Chinese male name. The same name is also spelled Chih-ming in Mandarin Wade–Giles romanisation, and Chi-ming or Tsz-ming in Cantonese pronunciation. According to Taiwan's 2010 census, it was the second-most popular name for men, with 14,022 having the name. It may be roughly translated as "having a clear goal in life". It was one of a number of names with the character "志" that began to become popular in the 1960s in Taiwan, an era when rising economic prosperity meant that parents hoped for their children to have more goals than simply making money.

People with this name include:

- Dominic Chan Chi-ming (born 1952), Hong Kong Catholic priest, Vicar General of the Hong Kong Catholic Diocese
- Chi Ming Chan (born 1949), Hong Kong chemical engineering professor
- Chung Chi-ming (fl. 1960s), Hong Kong broadcaster
- Fung Chi Ming (born 1951), Hong Kong football player
- Chih-Ming Ho, Taiwan-born American engineering professor
- Wang Zhiming (Christian) (1907–1973), Chinese pastor of Miao ethnicity
- Wang Zhiming (fencer) (born 1964), Chinese fencer
- Frankie Yick Chi-ming (born 1953), Hong Kong Legislative Council member

== See also ==
- Chinese given name
- Ho Chi Minh, Vietnamese leader whose name is also written with these characters (see chữ Nôm and chữ Hán)
