= Irbit State Museum of Fine Art =

Art museum in Irbit, Sverdlovsk, Russia

- Ирбитский государственный музей изобразительных искусств

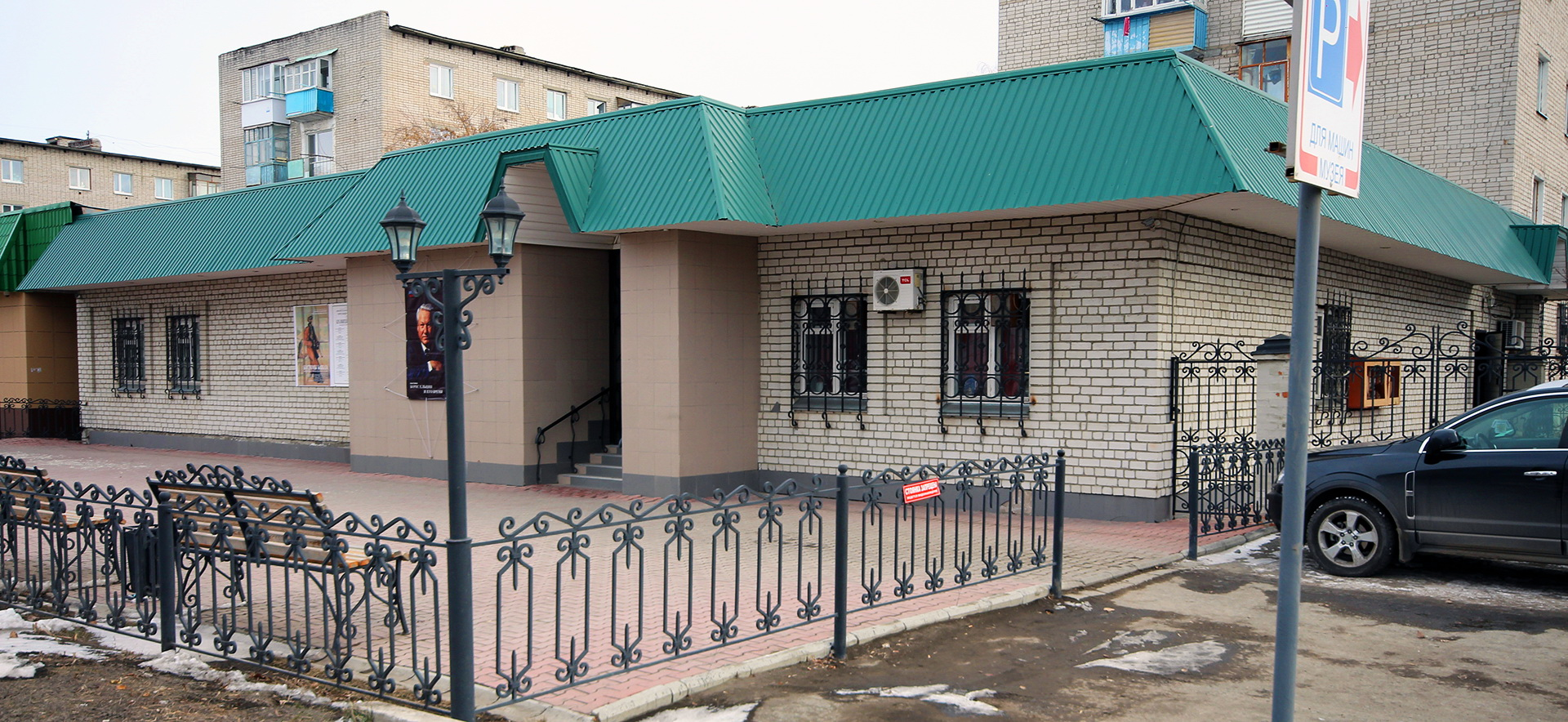
- Established: 3 January 1972
- Location: Irbit, Sverdlovsk Oblast, Russia
- Coordinates: 57°40′30″N 63°03′43″E
- Type: museum
- Collection size: 15,000

The Irbit State Museum of Fine Art (Russian: Ирбитский государственный музей изобразительных искусств) is an art museum in Irbit, Sverdlovsk Oblast, Russia.

== History ==
The museum was founded on 3 January 1972.

== Exhibitions ==
The museum has more than 15,000 collections. It contains some important works including etchings by famous European artists. At the moment the museum is the only one in Russia specializing in engravings. In its collection there are engravings by Italian, Dutch, Flemish, German, French, English, Spanish, Swiss, Austrian, Polish, Bulgarian, Belgian, and North American artists. The collection includes works from Albrecht Dürer to Francisco Goya. In 2012 the museum unveiled a major oil work by Peter Paul Rubens to add to its collection of his etchings. Russian art is represented by the works of A. F. Zubova, I. A. Sokolova, E. P. Chemesova, Mikhail Dobuzhinsky, Alexander Deyneka, and many others. The domestic collection represents the artists of Yekaterinburg and Nizhny Tagil.
