= Zemin (given name) =

- Traditional Chinese: 澤民
- Simplified Chinese: 泽民
- Hanyu Pinyin: Zémín
- Wade–Giles: Tsê^{2}-min^{2}
- Yale Romanization: Jaahkmàhn
- Jyutping: Zaak6man4

Zemin (澤民) is a Chinese given name. People with this name include:

- Au Tak (also Au Chak-mun; 1840–1920), Hong Kong entrepreneur
- Mao Zemin (1896–1943), Chinese politician, younger brother of Mao Zedong
- Shen Zemin (1900–1933), one of the earliest members of the Chinese Communist Party
- Chai Zemin (1916–2010), Chinese diplomat
- Jiang Zemin (1926–2022), Chinese politician, former General Secretary of the Chinese Communist Party
- Wong Jack-man (Huáng Zémín, 1940–2018), Chinese martial artist
- Liu Zemin (1944–2017), Chinese politician
- Vince Matthew Chung (born 1976), Hong Kong Amazing Race Asia winner
- Chu Tzer-ming, Taiwanese government official under President Tsai Ying-wen

== See also ==
- Zemina (surname)
- Zemin (disambiguation)
