= Irbit Bike Show =

Russian biking event

The Irbit Bike Show (Ирбитский байк слёт) is held every year at the end of July. It is organised by the local bike club as a celebration of the town's importance as a manufacturer of heavy motorcycles (see IMZ-Ural) in both the Soviet Union and Russia. Thousands of riders from throughout the Sverdlovsk region and other parts of Russia attend, and increasingly more foreign riders are attending.
