= Drezna (Klyazma) =

River in Moscow Oblast, Russia

Coordinates: 55°45′49″N 38°52′01″E

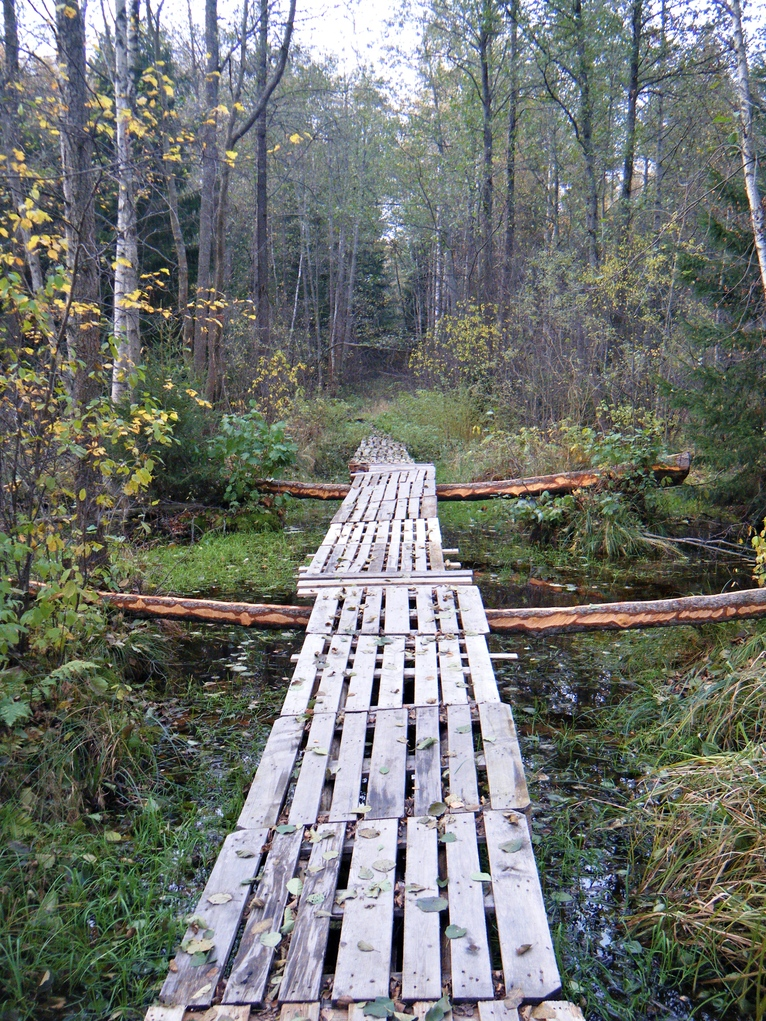
Foot bridge across River Drezna

The river Drezna is a tributary of the Klyazma that passes through the Moscow Oblast. It gave its name to the town of Drezna, which built alongside it 1897.
