= Alexander Izgoev =

Russian journalist and political activist

Alexander Solomonovich Izgoev (1872–1935) was a journalist and political activist in the Kadet Party.

He was born Alexander Solomonovich Lande in Irbit in the Urals and attended Novorossiysk and Tomsk University. He became a journalist writing for the Kadet newspaper Rech' (Speech) and Pyotr Struve's Russkaya mysl. He joined the central committee of the Kadet Party in 1906.
