= Valery Levental =

Russian theatre designer (1938–2015)

Valery Yakovlevich Levental (Russian: Вале́рий Я́ковлевич Левента́ль; 17 August 1938 – 8 June 2015) was a Russian theatrical scenic designer. He was named People's Artist of the USSR and was a member-correspondent of the Academy of Art.

He designed many musicals and dramas in Russia and abroad. Between 1988 and 1995, he was the lead artist at Russia's famed Bolshoi Theatre. Levental was awarded the State Prize of the Russian Federation in 1994.
