= Chi Ming Chan =

Chinese chemical engineer

Chi Ming Chan 陳志明
- Born: Chi Ming Chan; 21 April 1949 (age 77); Hong Kong
- Education: University of Minnesota; California Institute of Technology
- Scientific career
- Fields: Chemical Engineering
- Workplaces: Raychem; Hong Kong University of Science and Technology

Chi Ming Chan, (simplified Chinese: 陈志明; traditional Chinese: 陳志明; born 21 April 1949) is a Chinese chemical engineer at the Hong Kong University of Science and Technology (HKUST).

== Education ==
Chan obtained his Bachelor of Science in Chemical Engineering (High Distinction) from the University of Minnesota in 1975. He then pursued research and received his Master of Science and Ph.D. degrees in Chemical Engineering from the California Institute of Technology in 1977 and 1979 respectively.

== Career ==
Chan joined the HKUST in 1993 as a reader and became a professor in 1998. He is currently a chair professor of the Division of Environment and Department of Chemical and Biomolecular Engineering. He is also the director of the Interdisciplinary Programs Office and co-director of the Dual Degree Program in Technology and Management. He served as the associate Dean of the School of Engineering during July 2002 to June 2005 and was the acting department head of the Department of Chemical Engineering during July 2005 to September 2007.

== Professional memberships ==
Chan is a fellow of the Hong Kong Institution of Engineers, and member of the American Physical Society, American Chemical Society, American Vacuum Society and Society of Plastics Engineers. He is also an honorary chairman of the Society of Plastics Engineers (Hong Kong section).

== International awards and honors ==
- National Science Foundation Undergraduate Scholarship, University of Minnesota, Minneapolis, 1974
- Earle C. Anthony Fellowship, California Institute of Technology, 1975 - 1976
- American Vacuum Society Scholar, 1977 - 1979
- Advisory Professor, South China University of Technology, 1995 -
- Visiting professor, London South Bank University, 2010 - 2015
- Top Most Cited 50 Authors (2002 - 2008) in Polymer
- Appointed Panel of Assessor for Innovation and Technology Support Programme (ITSP), 2007 - 2009

== Selected publications ==
=== Books ===
- Chan, Chi Ming; M. A. Van Hove; W. H. Weinberg (February 2010). Low Energy Electron Diffraction: Experiment, Theory and Surface Structure Determination. Springer-Verlag. ISBN 978-3-540-16262-9.
- Chan, Chi Ming (1994). Polymer Surface Modification and Characterization. Hanser. ISBN 978-3-446-15870-2.

=== Papers ===
- Chan, Chi Ming; Li, Lin. (2005). "Direct Observation of the Growth of Lamellae and Spherulites by AFM". Advances in Polymer Science. 188: 1–41. doi:10.1007/b136971. ISBN 978-3-540-26162-9.
- Chan, Chi Ming; Wu, Jingshen; Li, Jian-Xiong; Cheung, Ying-Kit. (May 2002). "Polypropylene/calcium carbonate nanocomposites". Polymer. 43 (10): 2981–2992. doi:10.1016/S0032-3861(02)00120-9.
- Chan, Chi Ming; Weng, Lu-Tao; Li, Lin. (2002). "Applications of Surface Analysis Techniques in Surface Characterization of Polymers Surfaces and Interfaces". Journal of the Adhesion Society of Japan. 38 (5): 173–192. doi:10.11618/adhesion.38.173.
- Chan, Chi Ming; Weng, Lu-Tao. (2000). "Application of X-ray Photoelectron Spectroscopy and Static Secondary Ion Mass Spectrometry in Surface Characterization of Copolymers and Polymer Blends". Reviews in Chemical Engineering. 16 (4): 341–408. doi:10.1515/REVCE.2000.16.4.341. S2CID 100728513.
- Chan, C.-M.; Ko, T.-M.; Hiraoka, H. (May 1996). "Polymer surface modification by plasmas and photons". Surface Science Reports. 24 (1–2): 1–54. Bibcode:1996SurSR..24....1C. doi:10.1016/0167-5729(96)80003-3.
