= Ilya Zimin =

Russian journalist (1972–2006)

Ilya Zimin

Ilya Anatolyevich Zimin (Russian: Илья Анатольевич Зимин, May 1, 1972 – February 26, 2006) was a Russian journalist and television reporter who worked for the NTV network. Winner of the prize TEFI (2002) — the reporter. He was killed by a youth who turned out to be his sexual partner.

== Death ==
On February 26, 2006, Zimin was murdered under unclear circumstances. His death was caused by a cranial trauma. The police did not consider robbery as the cause of murder, neither did they connect Zimin's death with his professional activity. They suspected that the murder was the result of a domestic dispute. However, the main suspect, Igor Velchev, arrested on June 23, 2006 in Moldova, denied guilt. He stated in his defense that Zimin had approached him "offering sexual relations", so Velchev "pushed him hard and walked out."

On December 25, 2007, the Ocnița District Court of Moldova fully acquitted the accused.

Ilya Zimin is buried at the Central Cemetery in Khabarovsk.
