= Mstislav Dobuzhinsky =

Russian and Lithuanian artist

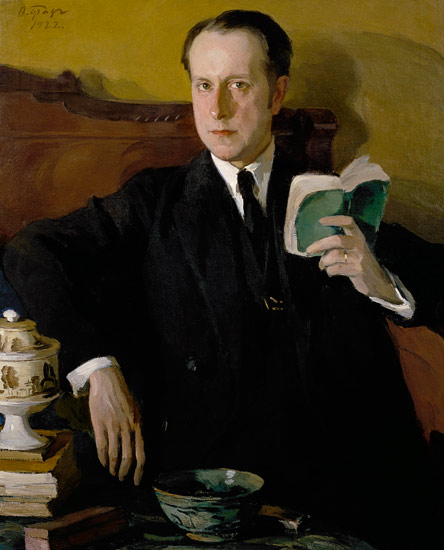
Portrait of Dobuzhinsky by Osip Braz, 1922

Mstislav Valerianovich Dobuzhinsky or Dobujinsky (Russian: Мстислав Валерианович Добужинский, Lithuanian: Mstislavas Dobužinskis; August 14, 1875 – November 20, 1957) was a Russian-Lithuanian artist noted for his cityscapes conveying the explosive growth and decay of the early 20th-century city.

== Biography ==
Of noble Lithuanian extraction, Dobuzhinsky was born on August 14, 1875, in Novgorod into the family of an army officer. From 1885 to 1887, he attended the Drawing School of the Society for the Promotion of the Artists. Between 1895 and 1899, he read law at Saint Petersburg Imperial University, simultaneously studying in private studios. After graduating from the university, he was trained from 1899 to 1901 by Anton Ažbe in Munich and Simon Hollósy in Nagybánya (Austria-Hungary). In Munich, he came to be influenced by the Jugendstil. On his return to Russia, he joined the Mir iskusstva, an artistic circle which idealized the 18th century as the "age of elegance".

Dobuzhinsky was distinguished from other miriskusniki by his expressionist manner and keen interest in modern industrial cityscapes. He often painted seedy or tragic scenes from urban life which expressed the nightmarish bleakness and loneliness of modern times. Among his works were also humorous vignettes and sketches with demon-like creatures which seemed to embody the monstrosities of urbanization.

Like other members of the Mir iskusstva, Dobuzhinsky also experimented with scenic design. At first he worked for Konstantin Stanislavski at the Moscow Art Theatre, but later on also contributed sets to several Diaghilev productions. He was renowned as an excellent art teacher; among his young pupils was Vladimir Nabokov, with whom he maintained correspondence for decades.

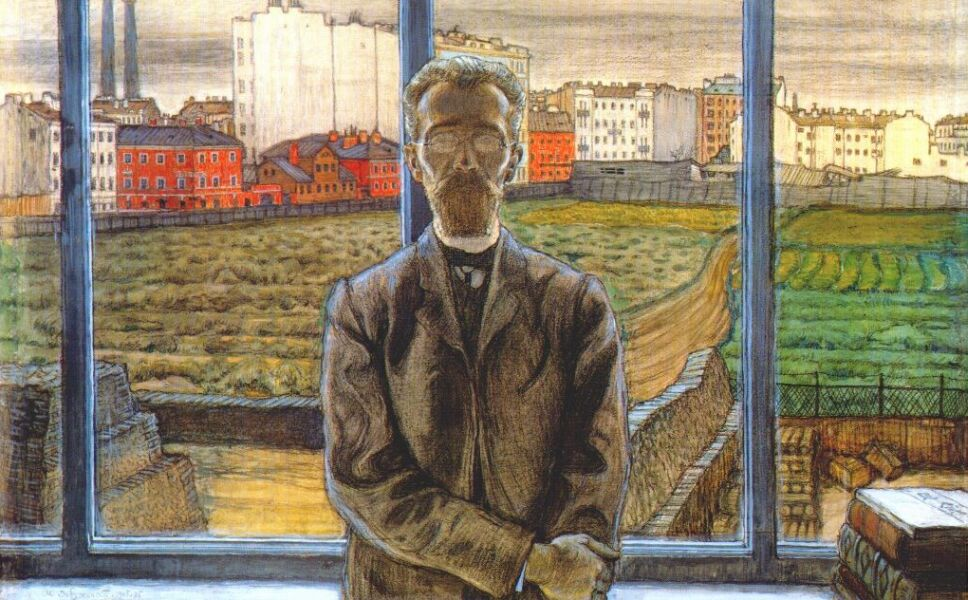
Mstislav Dobuzhinsky, A man with eyeglasses, or The portrait of Konstantin Sunnerberg, 1901–1902, The Tretyakov Gallery, Moscow.

During World War I, Dobuzhinsky went with Eugene Lanceray to the front lines to sketch. In 1918, he supervised the theatrical workshop at the State Educational Workshops of the Decorative Arts (the former Stieglitz School of the Technical Drawing). In 1920, he took part in the 2nd World Congress of the Communist International. In 1923–1924, he went abroad to study developments in European art and to arrange one-man shows. In 1924, Dobuzhinsky followed the advice of Jurgis Baltrušaitis and withdrew to Lithuania. He was naturalized there in 1924 and lived in Kaunas until 1925. Between 1925 and 1929 lived in Paris where he designed sets for Nikita Balieff's The Bat. He returned to Lithuania in 1929. In Lithuania he worked at a state theatre as scenographer and created scenography for 38 plays, besides running a private painting school (1930–1933). He then emigrated to England in 1935, and moved to the United States in 1939 where he stayed for the duration of World War II. He spent the last 10 years of his life in Europe, occasionally returning to New York City for theatrical work. He died in New York City on November 20, 1957. His memoirs were published posthumously in Russian.

Among his later works are series of masterful and dramatic illustrations, notably for Fyodor Dostoevsky's White Nights (1923) and Yury Olesha's Three Fat Men (1925). Dobuzhinsky contributed sets for theatre productions in Paris, Brussels, Amsterdam, and Düsseldorf. During World War II, Dobuzhinsky painted imaginary landscapes of the besieged Leningrad.

After his death in 1957, he was interred at the Sainte-Geneviève-des-Bois Russian Cemetery.

== Collections ==
Dobuzhinsky is represented in the following institutions, among others: Tretyakov Gallery, Moscow; The A. A. Bakhrushin Theatre Museum, Moscow; The Russian Museum, St. Petersburg; National Gallery of Armenia, Yerevan; Irbit State Museum of Fine Art, Irbit.
