= Ivan Zimin =

Ivan Nikitich Zimin
- Иван Никитич Зимин
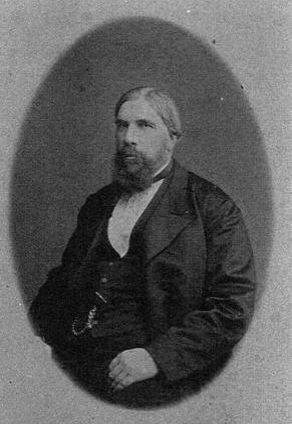
- Ivan Zimin in 1870s
- Born: 1818; Drezna, Russian Empire
- Died: December 17, 1887
- Occupation(s): Entrepreneur, merchant
- Children: Grigory Ivanovich; Ivan Ivanovich; Alexander Ivanovich; Sergei Ivanovich

Ivan Nikitich Zimin (Russian: Иван Никитич Зимин; 1818-1887) was a Russian industrialist who developed Drezna as a mill town.

His sons, Sergei and Grigory Zimin inherited his business, but his wife, Evdokia Savvateevna, remained an active participant in the management of company business.

He was buried in the Preobrazhenskoye Cemetery.
