= Sergei Zimin =

Russian entrepreneur and opera manager

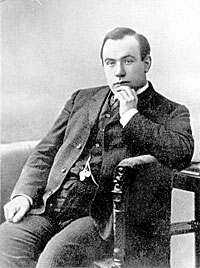
Sergei Zimin in 1904

Sergei Ivanovich Zimin (Сергей Ива́нович Зими́н) (June 20 (June 8, Old Style), 1875 – July 26, 1942) was an entrepreneur and opera manager from the Russian Empire. In 1903 he founded Zimin Opera company.

He was born in Zuevo, to an Old Believer family, the son of textile mill owner Ivan Nikitich Zimin.

Under his leadership Zimin Opera staged more than 120 operas.
