= Zemina (surname) =

Zemina is a surname. Notable people with the surname include:

- Abba bar Zemina, Jewish scholar of the fourth century
- Paige Zemina (born 1968), American swimmer

== See also ==
- Zeina
- Zemin
