= IMZ-Ural =

Ural sidecar motorcycle manufacturer

- Type: Private company
- Industry: Powersports
- Founded: 1941; 85 years ago
- Founder: Soviet Government
- Headquarters: Redmond, Washington, United States
- Key people: Ilya Khait, Madina Merzhoeva
- Products: Motorcycles
- Website: IMZ-Ural.com

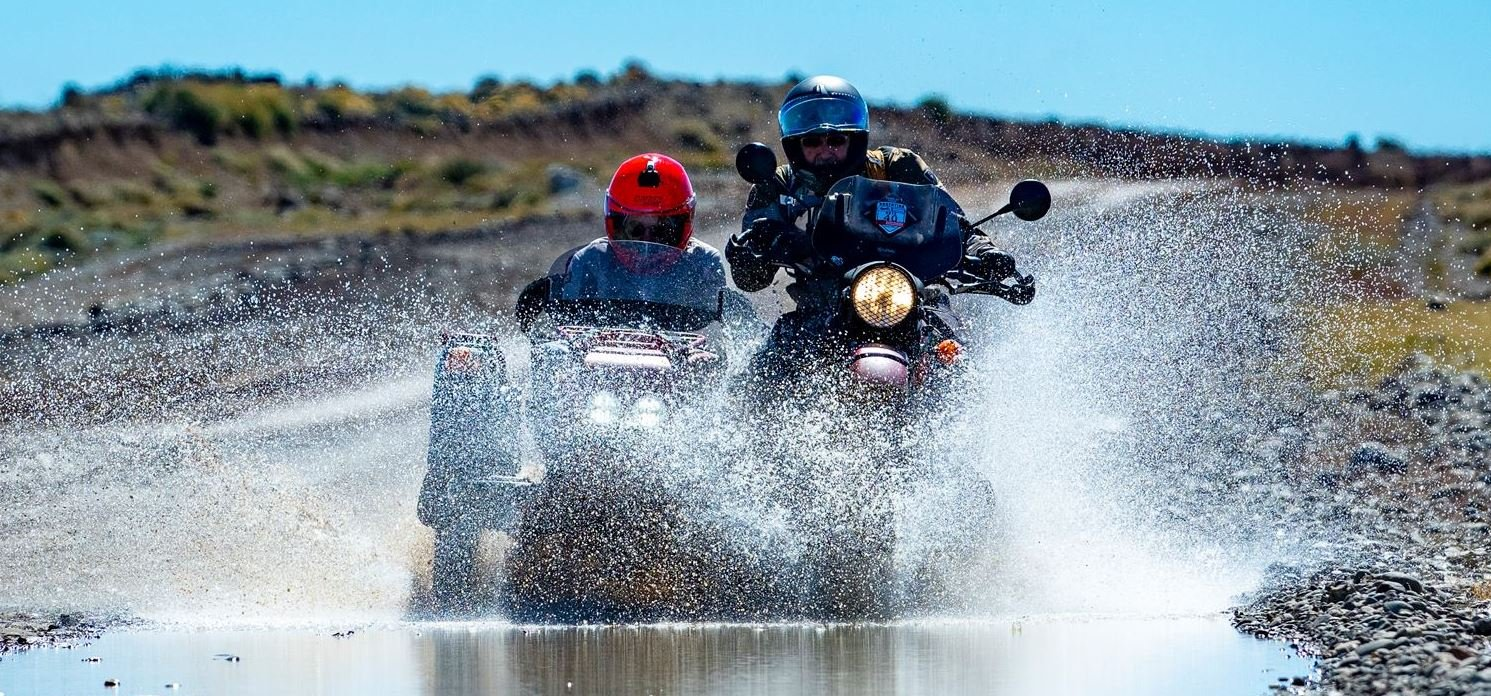
A new Ural Gear Up is put through its paces.

IMZ-Ural Group Inc., more commonly known as Ural Motorcycles (Russian: Мотоциклы Урал, romanized: Mototsikly Ural), is a multinational company involved in developing, manufacturing, and worldwide distribution of Ural sidecar motorcycles. Headquartered in Redmond, Washington, with assembly facilities in Petropavl, Kazakhstan, Ural is the oldest and one of the world's largest manufacturers of sidecar-equipped motorcycles.

== History ==
IMZ-Ural's origins are linked to developments in the Eastern Front during World War II as the Soviet Union was preparing to repel possible military action by Nazi Germany. Mobility was especially stressed after the Soviet Union had witnessed the effect of the blitzkrieg on Poland, and a small, rugged, multi-purpose vehicle that could handle Russia's underdeveloped road network and pockmarked battlefields was a priority.

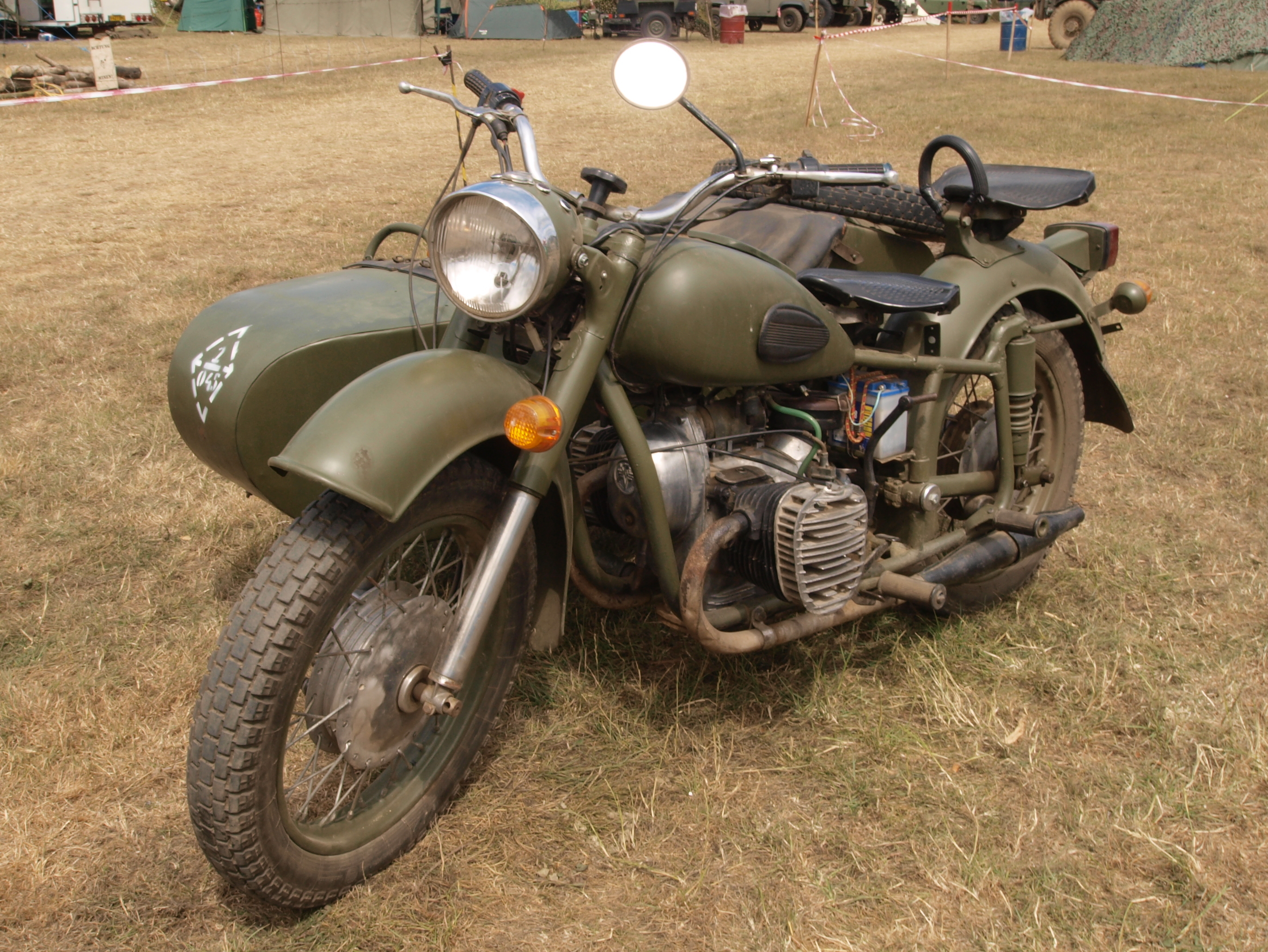
A BMW R71, the bike from which the original IMZ M-72 was developed.

=== Pre-war and the Nazi Invasion ===
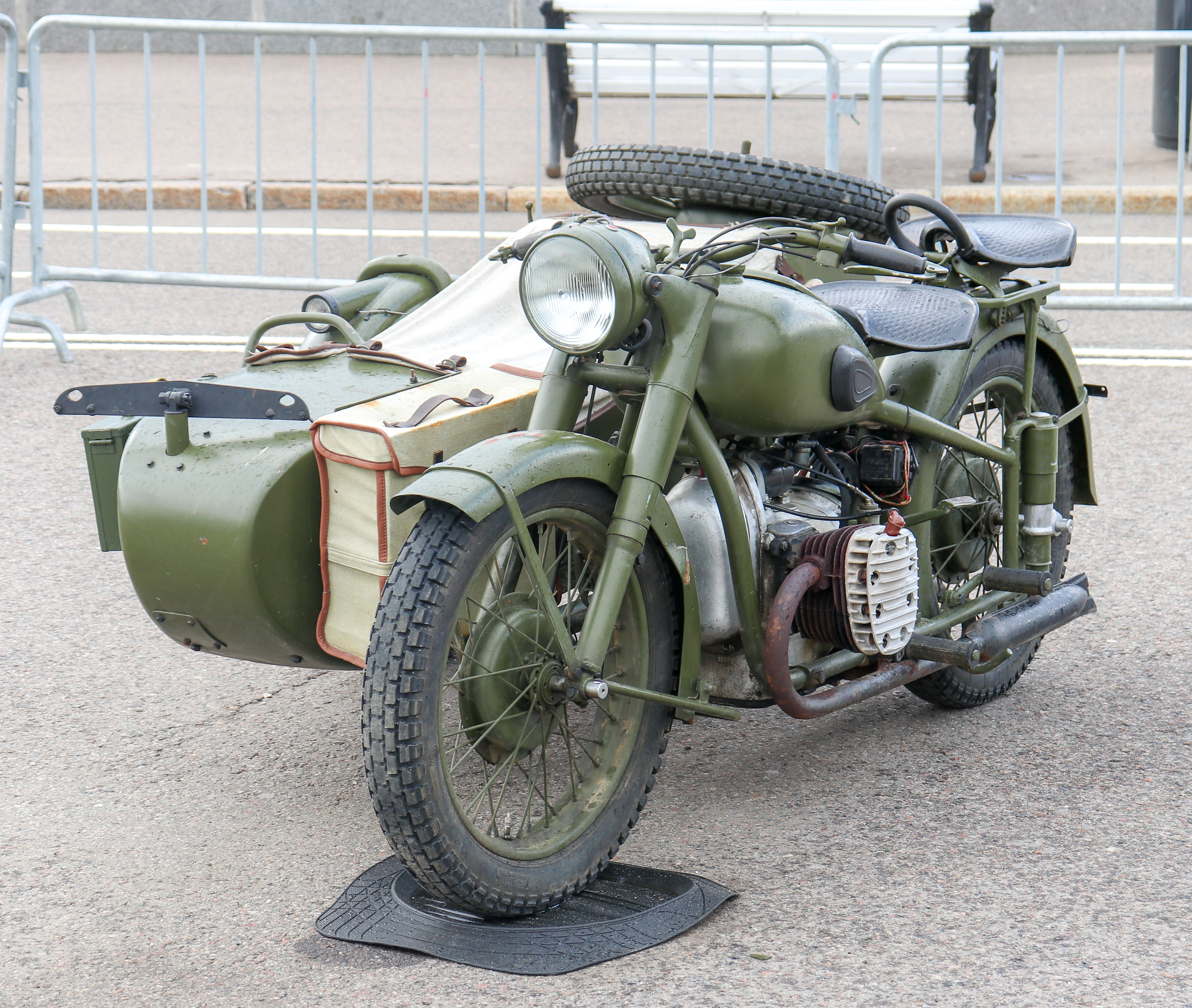
An IMZ M-72 on display in Moscow

A meeting was held at the People's Commissariat of Defense of the USSR at the end of 1930s to devise a motorcycle that would be suitable for the Red Army, and the Nazi Wehrmacht's BMW R71 motorcycle was found to closely match the Red Army's requirements. Five units were covertly purchased through Sweden and handed over to Moscow Motorcycle Plant, recently organized in a retooled bicycle factory. Soviet engineers dismantled the BMWs and reverse engineered the bike's design in every detail. Molds and dies were made to produce engines, gearboxes and other components. The production of these new military sidecar motorcycles, designated M-72 by the Red Army, started in August 1941.

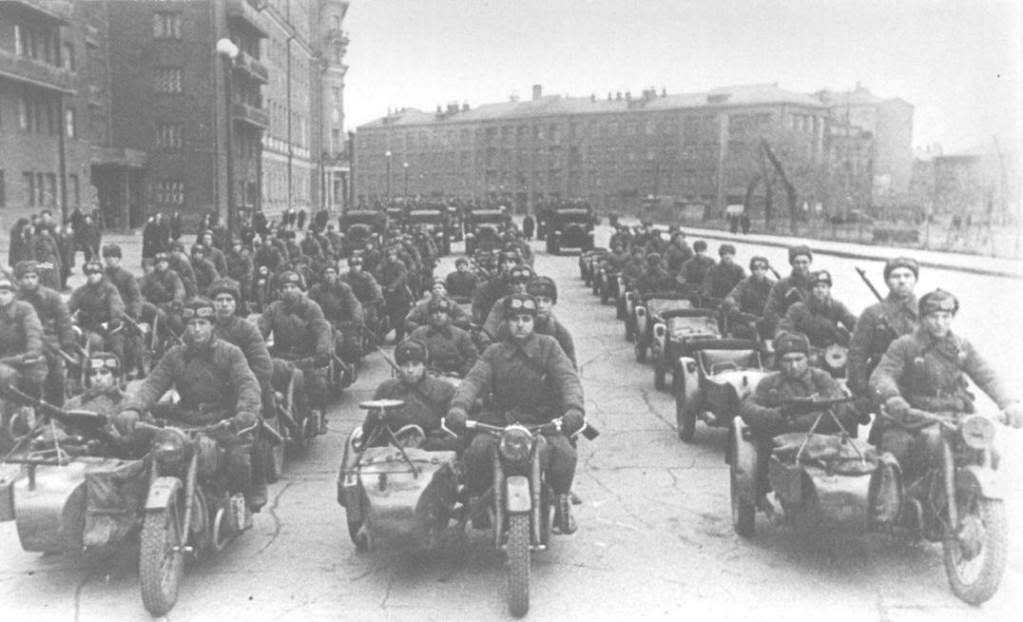
A formation of Red Army IMZ M-72 motorcycles.

The suspected military offensive occurred in the summer of 1941, as the Nazis executed Operation Barbarossa and invaded the Soviet Union. The opening stages of the attack were so swift and so effective, that Soviet strategists worried that Moscow would quickly be in range of Luftwaffe bombers. On October 21, 1941, the decision was made to move the motorcycle plant east, out of bombing range and into the resource-rich Ural mountain region. The site chosen was the town of Irbit, located on the fringes of Siberia in the Ural Mountains.

Irbit was chosen because it had been an important trade center throughout Russian history and was the site of the country's second largest fair before the Revolution of 1917. The only available building large enough to contain the factory was a brewery outside of town, beyond the railway line. This brewery became the Irbit Motorcycle Factory, or IMZ (Russian Ирбитский мотоциклетный завод; Romanized Irbitsky Motosikletny Zavod), and quickly began cranking out motorcycles for the war effort. On February 25, 1942, the first batch of motorcycles—assembled from the parts brought from Moscow—went to the front. During WWII a total of 9,799 M-72 motorcycles were delivered for reconnaissance detachments and mobile troops.

=== Post-war Developments ===
After the war, the IMZ factory was expanded and updated, which including construction of frame and body parts shops, an aluminum foundry, and other shops to produce various motorcycle components. Throughout the 1950s, the motorcycles produced by IMZ were for military use only. By the end of the decade, however, military production was moved to a sister plant in Kyiv, Ukraine, (KMZ) while IMZ focused on producing bikes for the domestic market. During this time, the IMZ facility grew into a massive, Soviet-style collective factory that produced nearly every component used to build its motorcycles. The factory's various shops produced everything from rubber and plastic parts to shock absorbers, brake components, and control cables. Nearly 10,000 people worked at the massive factory, and at its peak it produced around 130,000 motorcycles annually—primarily for the Russian domestic market as a cheap alternative to automobiles.

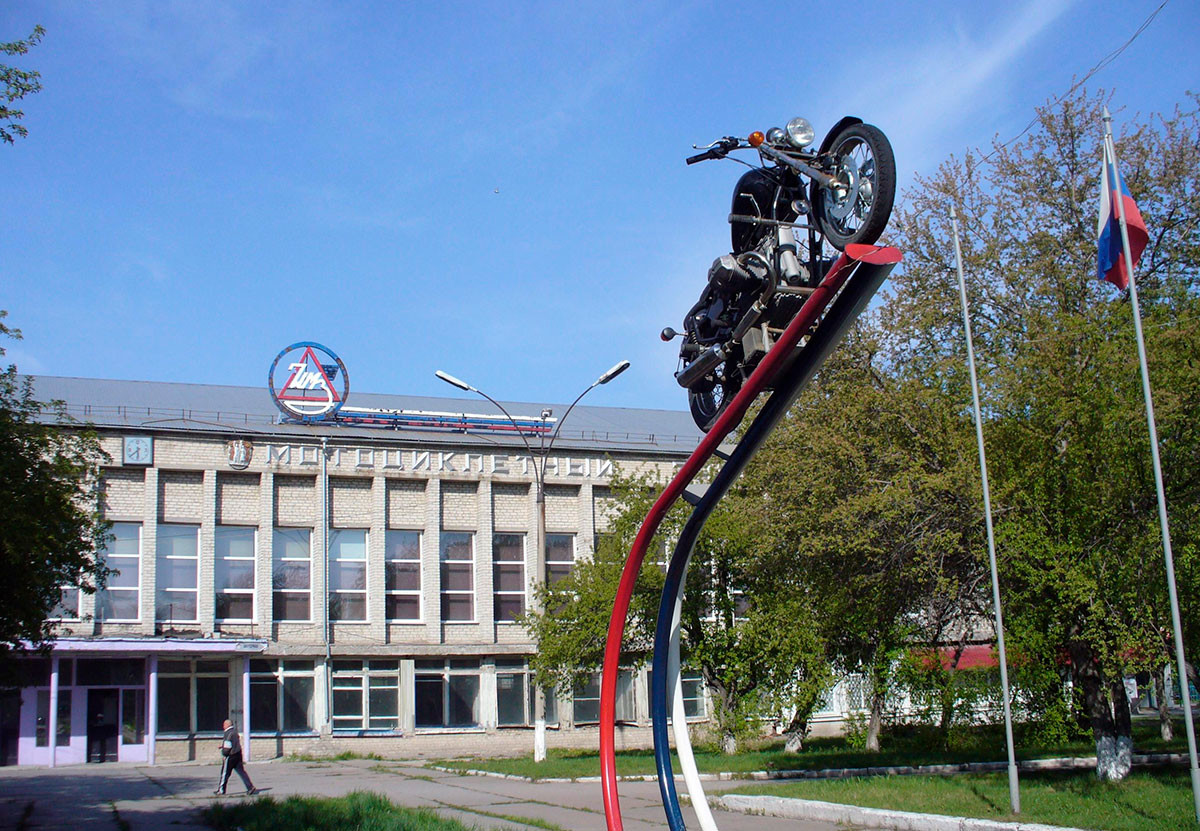
The old IMZ-Ural production facility in Irbit

=== Ural Exports ===
IMZ began exporting motorcycles in 1953, mostly to Soviet states and allies in the Global South. Over the next five decades, Ural motorcycles were exported to every corner of the Soviet Union and could be found as far afield as Western Europe, Southeast Asia, India, and even the U.S. In the 1970s, UK company Satra Motors imported Urals to sell under the Cossack Motorcycles brand. In 1994, an independent distributor called Ural-America began selling Urals in the United States. This set the foundations of Ural's presence in America and led directly to the formation of the current IMZ-Ural company.

As of 2023, Ural Motorcycles are sold all over the world through a network of over 190 dealerships and service centers. Ural's main market is the United States, but the company's bikes are popular in Japan, Canada, the United Kingdom, Australia, and throughout the European Union.

== Modern-day products ==
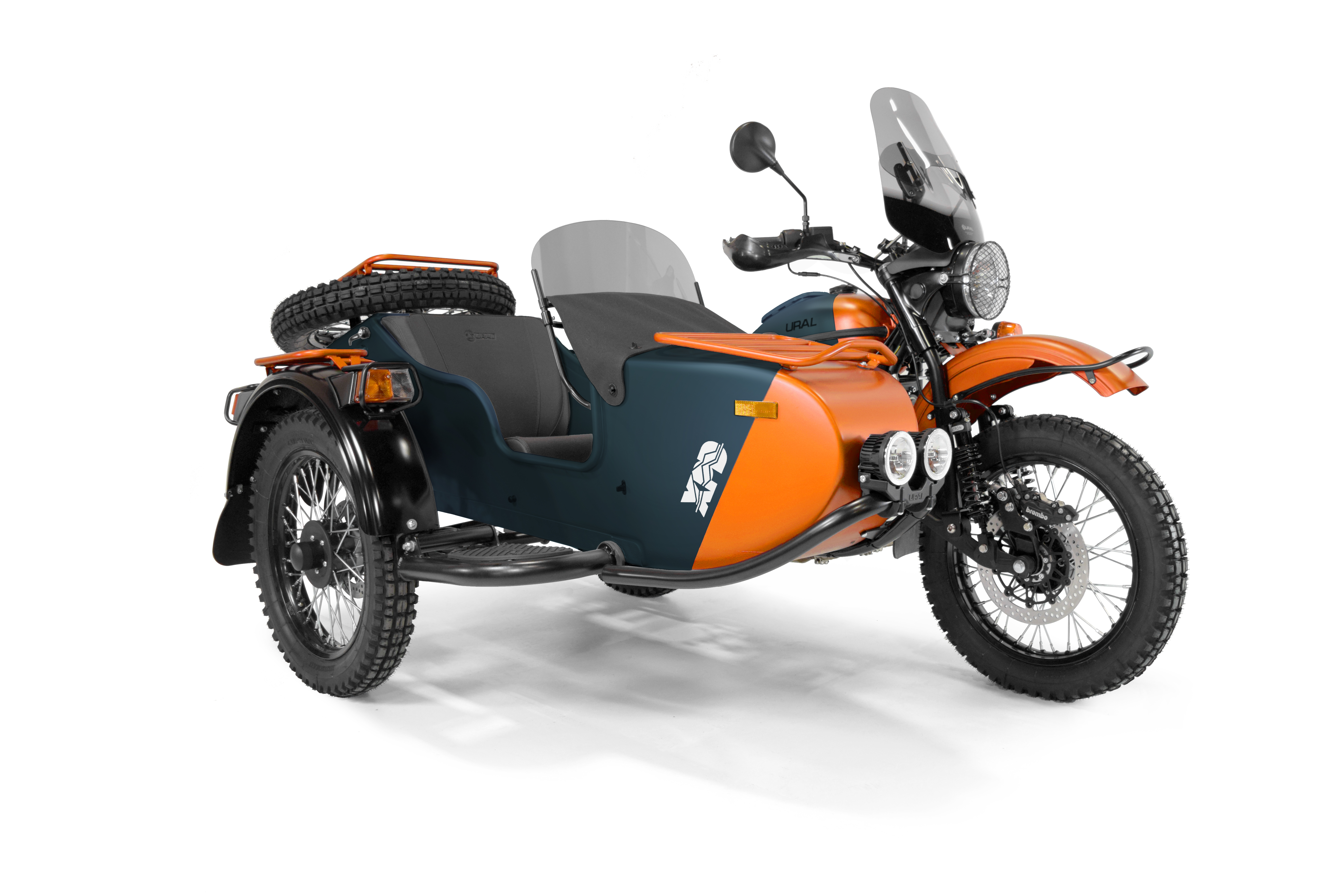
A Ural Gear Up Expedition in the Polar Dawn colorway. This is the company's top of the line motorcycle.

Ural's main product is a heavy-duty, sidecar-equipped adventure motorcycle called the Gear Up. Available in three trim levels—Base, Standard, and Expedition—the Gear Up is powered by Ural's 749cc, air-cooled, four-stroke, fuel injected, overhead-valve, two-cylinder boxer engine that produces 41 horsepower at 5,500 RPM and 42-foot-pounds of torque at 4,300 RPM. Power is transmitted to the rear wheel through a four-speed (plus reverse) gearbox with a dual-disc dry clutch and a shaft final drive. In addition, all Gear Ups feature an on-demand two-wheel drive system that powers the sidecar wheel via a CV driveshaft connected to the rear drive hub.

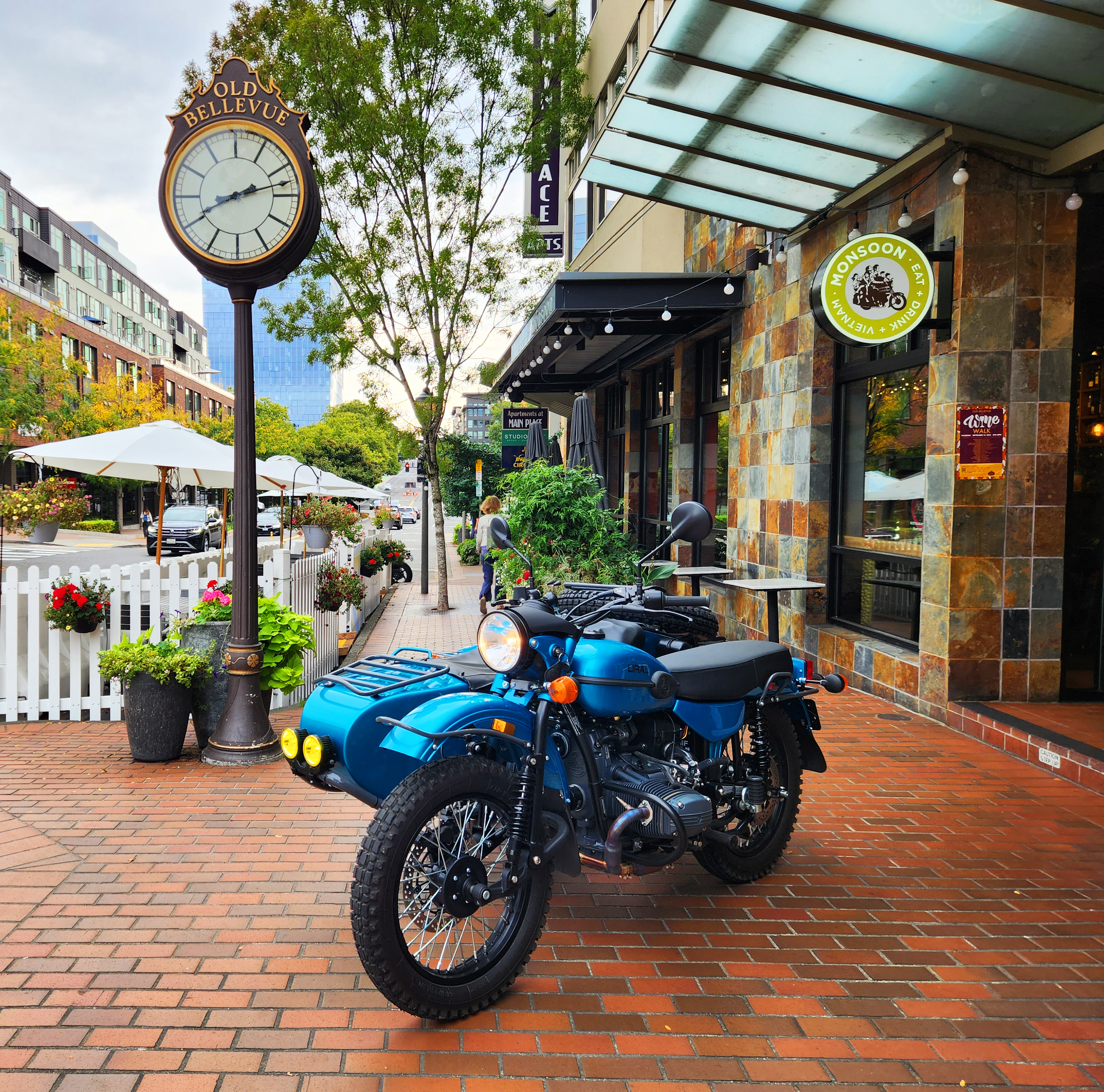
A 2023 Ural Gear Up in Caribbean Blue.

Despite its classic looks, the Gear Up is a modern motorcycle equipped with parts from numerous international parts suppliers. The brakes are a combination of Brembo two-piston calipers and floating rotors by NG Brakes on all three wheels, suspension is by Sachs, and the tires are by Heidenau Tires. Other parts are supplied by Denso (electrics), Keihin (throttle bodies), J. Juan (parking brake), and Italcerchio (wheels), among others.

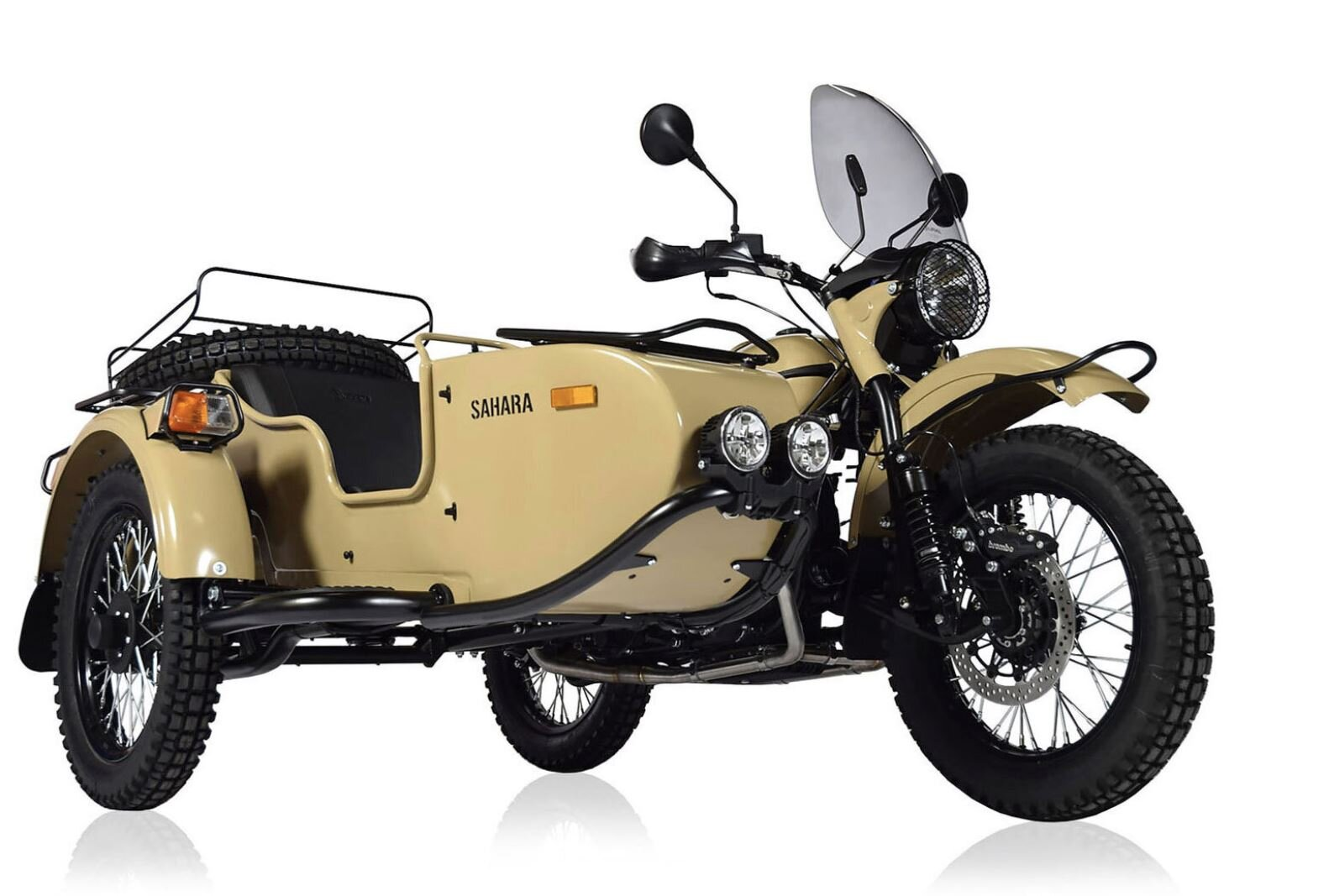
A Gear Up Sahara, the company's most popular special edition motorcycle.

Along with being fully integrated into the modern global supply chain, Ural and its products are in compliance with all applicable environmental and safety standards and protocols, including Euro 5.

== Corporate information ==
In November 1992, the state-owned IMZ transformed into a privatized entity owned 40 percent by management and employees through grant, 38 percent by auction with privatization vouchers (mostly management and employees also), with 22 percent retained by the government.

At the beginning of 1998, the business was bought by Russian-Georgian statesmen and businessman Kakha Bendukidze. By that time, IMZ had almost completely lost the domestic market as Russians started buying used Western cars instead of sidecar motorcycles. In 1998 IMZ produced fewer than 2,000 units but the factory still employed nearly 4,000 people. To fix this problem, Bendukidze brought in new management and mandated new ideas. Investments were made to develop a two-wheeled motorcycle, the chopper-styled Ural Wolf. Unfortunately, the Wolf's price was too high and its quality was too low and the company couldn't sell enough bikes to stay afloat.

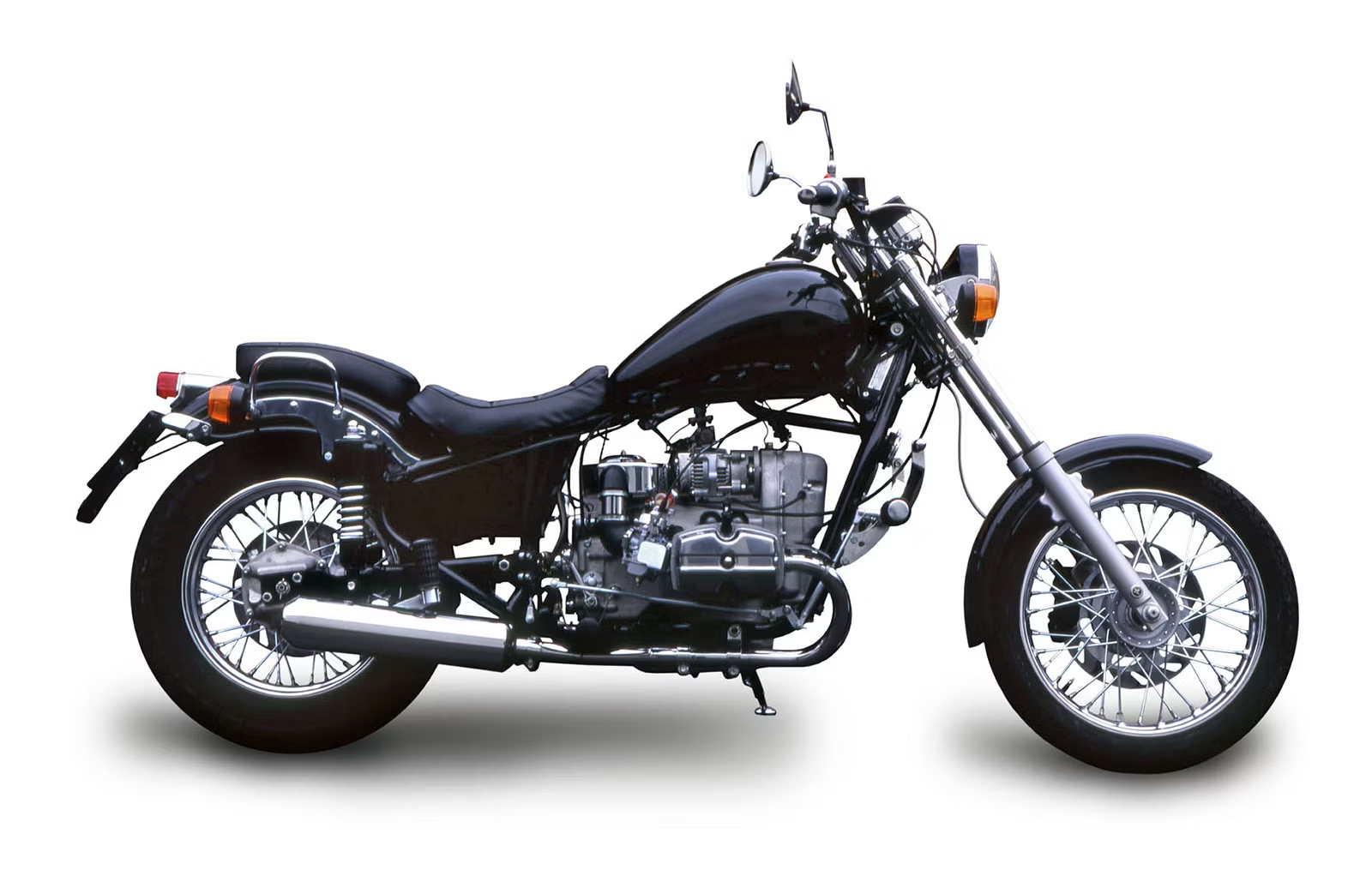
The ill-fated Ural Wolf

In October 2000, the factory had to halt production as it wasn't able to pay its bills and Bendukidze was unwilling to invest more money into the dying company. That December, Bendukidze sold the factory to three individuals—including the company's current CEO and majority shareholder, the Russian-born American businessman Ilya Khait—in a process of management buyout. The new owners immediately began reorganizing the factory by selling off assets, reducing the workforce by two-thirds, and consolidating production in the facility's smaller buildings. The new owners also decided to focus mainly on export markets and to do what the factory did best—produce sidecar-equipped motorcycles. Motorcycle production restarted in the spring of 2001.

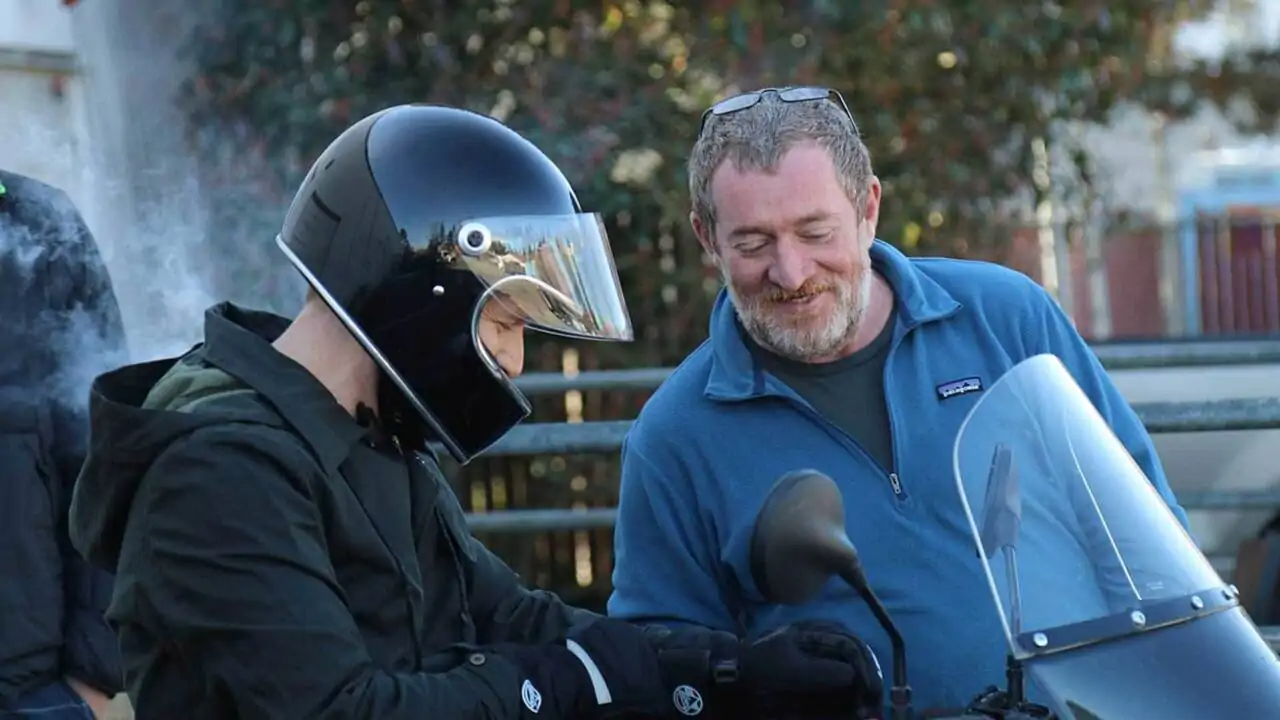
IMZ-Ural's CEO Ilya Khait.

The next year, in 2002, the new owners decided to consolidate the disparate distribution networks under company control. The American distribution arm, Irbit Motorworks of America, Inc., was incorporated in Redmond, WA. Ural Motorcycles GmbH, the European distribution arm, was formed in Austria in 2003. Corporate headquarters was moved to the United States in 2006 with the formation of the holding company IMZ-Ural Group, Inc. in Redmond, WA. Besides the manufacturing entities, IMZ-Ural Group, Inc. currently owns distribution companies in the US, Australia, Japan, Spain, and the Czech Republic.

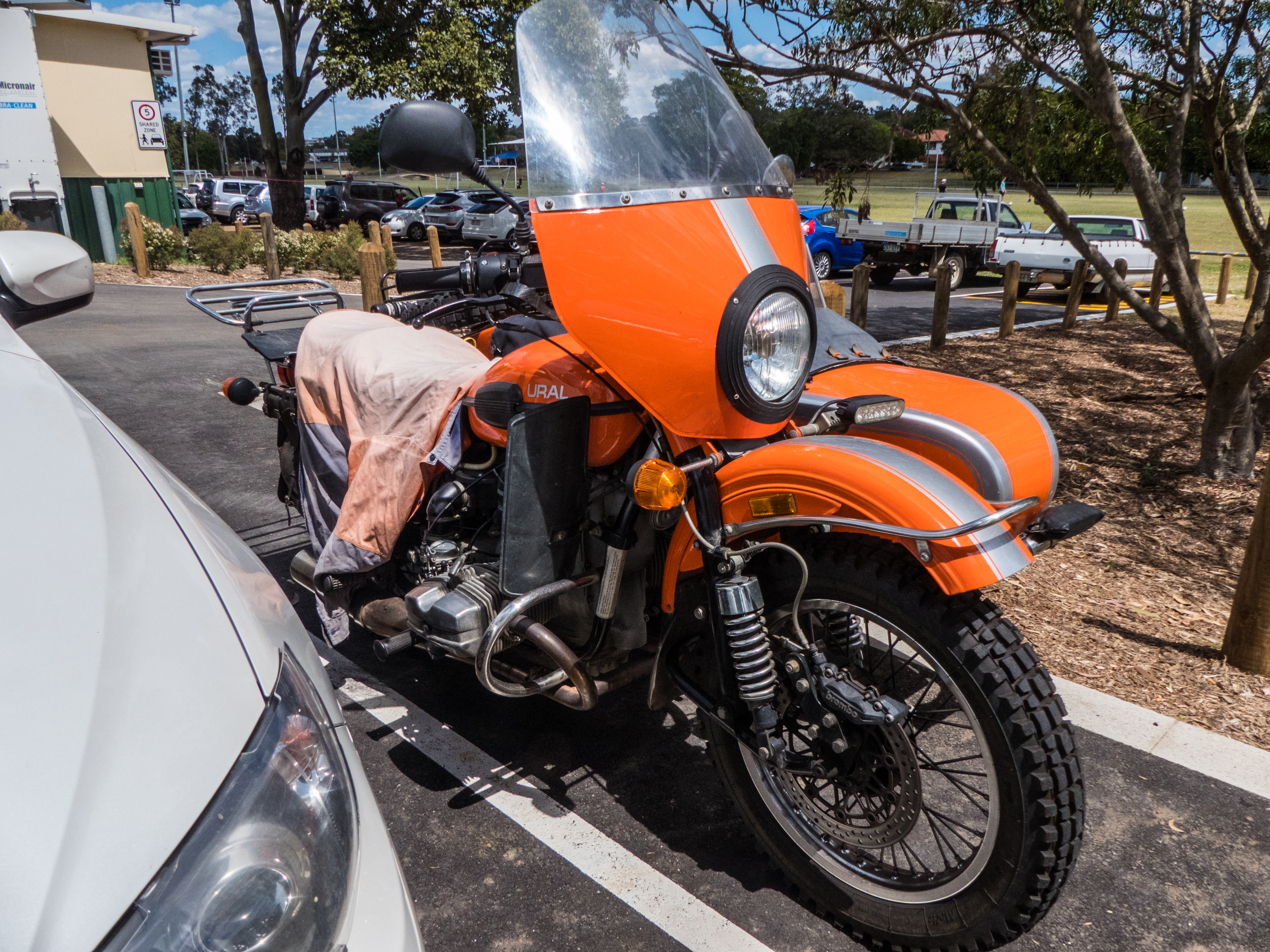
Australian Ural with side car to the left

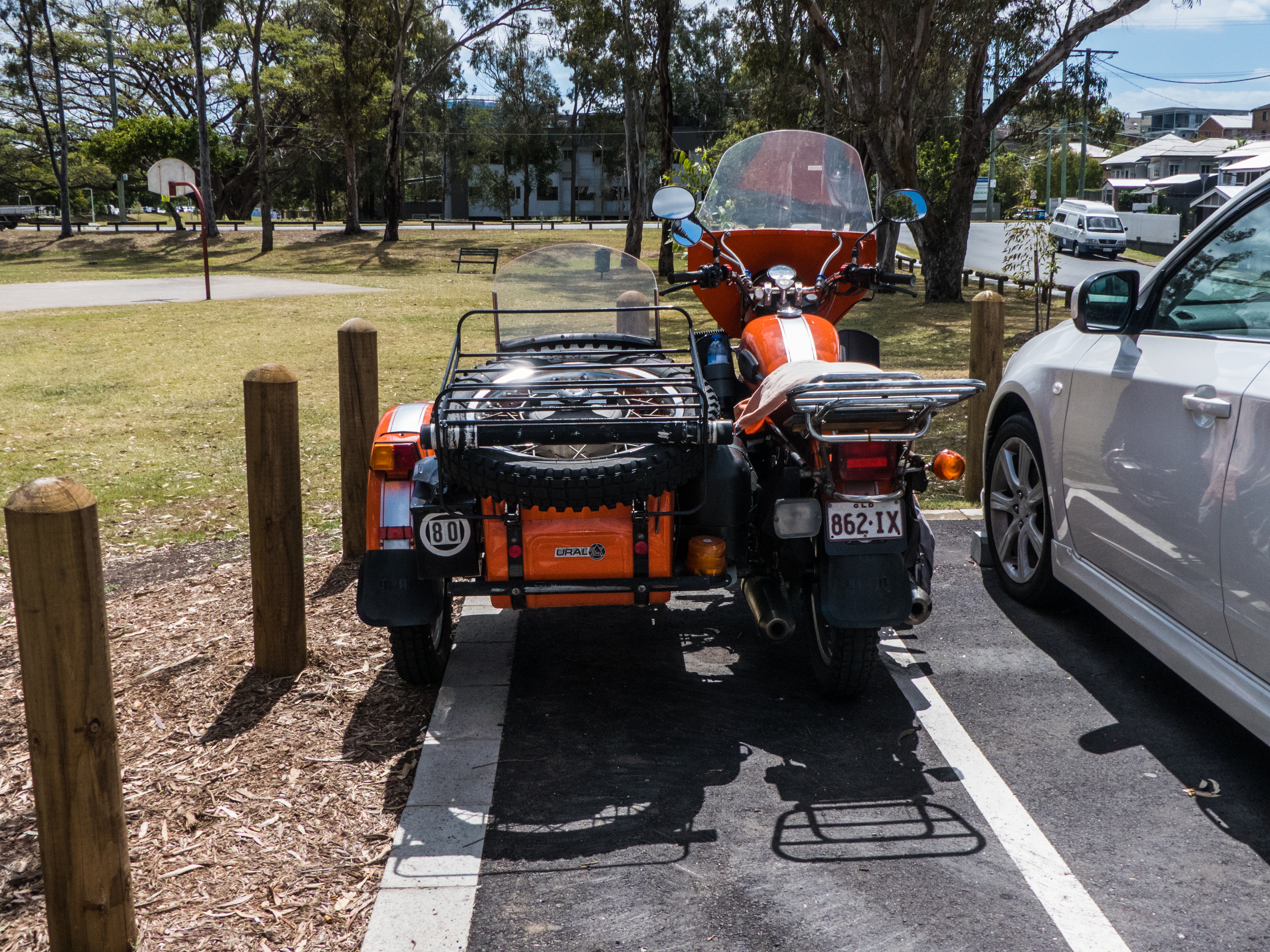
Australian Ural with side car to the left

During the opening rounds of Russia's 2022 invasion of Ukraine, IMZ-Ural released a statement unequivocally condemning the invasion and calling for a peaceful resolution. In March of that year, Ural production ground to a halt due to inability to import components and export bikes out of Russia caused by international sanctions laid on the country.

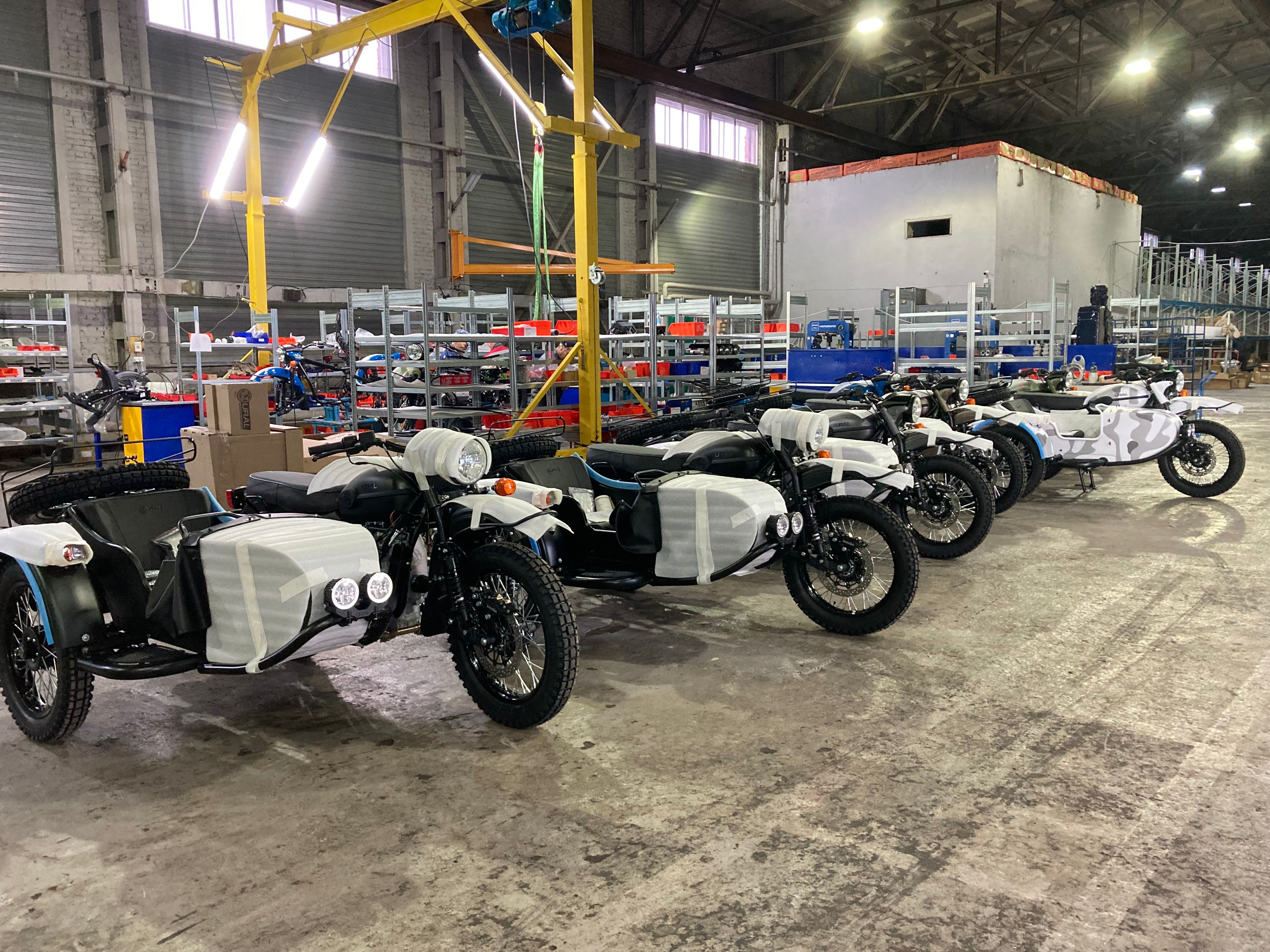
New Gear Ups at the IMZ-Kazakhstan facility.

In light of these issues, the company decided to open a new assembly facility in Petropavl, Kazakhstan. Petropavl, a city roughly 373 miles (600 kilometers) south-east from Irbit, was chosen because it had an established industrial infrastructure and a sizeable Russian-speaking populace.

Production at the new factory, IMZ-Kazakhstan, began in August 2022, and shipment of new motorcycles started soon thereafter. Since then, all new Ural Gear Ups have been built in Kazakhstan using parts supplied from all over the world.
