= Zimin Opera =

Opera house in Moscow (Russia)

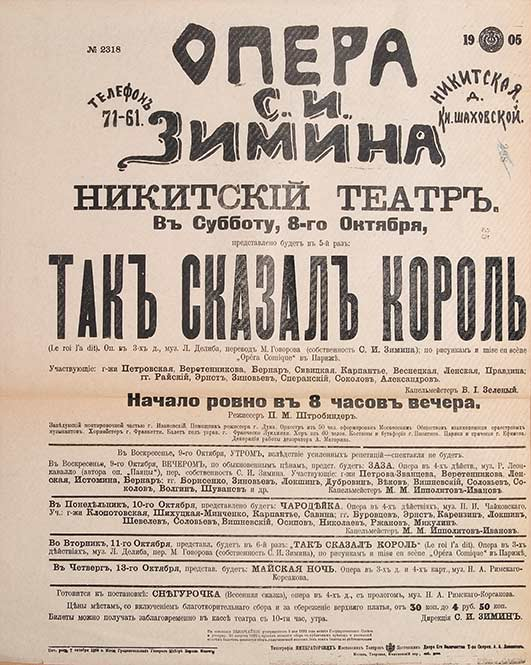

The Zimin Opera was founded by the Russian entrepreneur Sergei Zimin in Moscow, Russia in 1903. The company staged the premieres of such operas as Rimsky-Korsakov's Golden Cockerel, Gretchaninoff's Beatris Sister and Ippolitov-Ivanov's Izmena.

The company closed in May 1917.
