= Taganrog State Literary and Historical and Architectural Museum-Reserve =

Museum in Taganrog, Rostov, Russia

Coordinates: 47°12′47″N 38°55′41″E

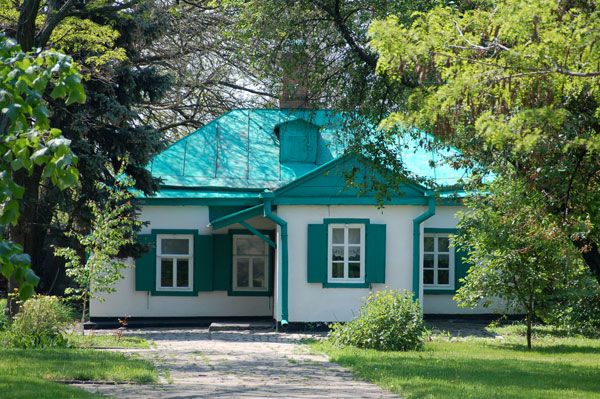
- Literary Museum of Anton Chekhov
- Established: 1981
- Location: Taganrog, Rostov oblast, Russia
- Director: Lipovenko Elizaveta Vasilyevna

Taganrog State Literary and Historical and Architectural Museum-Reserve (Russian: Таганрогский государственный литературный и историко-архитектурный музей-заповедник) is an association on the basis of literary and local history museums.

== History of the museum ==
It was created in 1981. The total area is more than 5000 square meters.

== Structure of the museum ==
Literary part of the association

- The Literary Museum of Anton Chekhov is located in the building of the former men's classical gymnasium. Here the writer A. P. Chekhov studied. It was built in 1843 upon the project of F. Boffo in Russian classicistic country style. The museum was opened on May 29, 1935. The exposition of the museum presents materials about the life and work of Anton Pavlovich Chekhov. The exhibition includes about 1600 exhibits.
- Memorial Museum "Chekhov's House" is the house in which Anton Chekhov was born.
- The Museum "Chekhov's shop". The museum is located in a house that Chekhov's family rented from 1869 to 1874.
- Museum of I.D. Vasilenko located in a house in which from 1923 to 1966 lived a writer, Stalin Prize laureate Ivan Dmitrievich Vasilenko. Transferred to the Taganrog State Literary and Historical and Architectural Museum-Reserve in 1988.

Historical part

- The Museum of Local History was founded at the end of the 19th century on the initiative of A.P. Chekhov. Chekhov provided material assistance to the museum, at his request, paintings were given to the museum by famous Russian artists. In 1927 the museum moved to the building of the Alferaki Palace in Taganrog.
- A. Durov Museum - built in modern style in 1900, this mansion contains exhibition devoted to Anatoly Durov, renowned animal trainer, one of the most notable members of the world-famous Durov dynasty.
- Taganrog City Architectural Development Museum was opened in 1981. It is located in the mansion "Sharonov's House" which by the Decree of the President of the Russian Federation №. 176 of February 20, 1995, was assigned to the monuments of architecture of the Russian Federation. The building was built in 1912 in Art Nouveau style according to the project of Academician F.O. Shekhtel. The museum conducts an active exhibition activity, placing in its halls as works of local artists, as well as various traveling exhibitions. Among the famous artists exhibiting in the museum their work is Yuri Shabelnikov, Alexander Kislyakov, Natalia Duritskaya.
Exhibits of the Museum of Local History

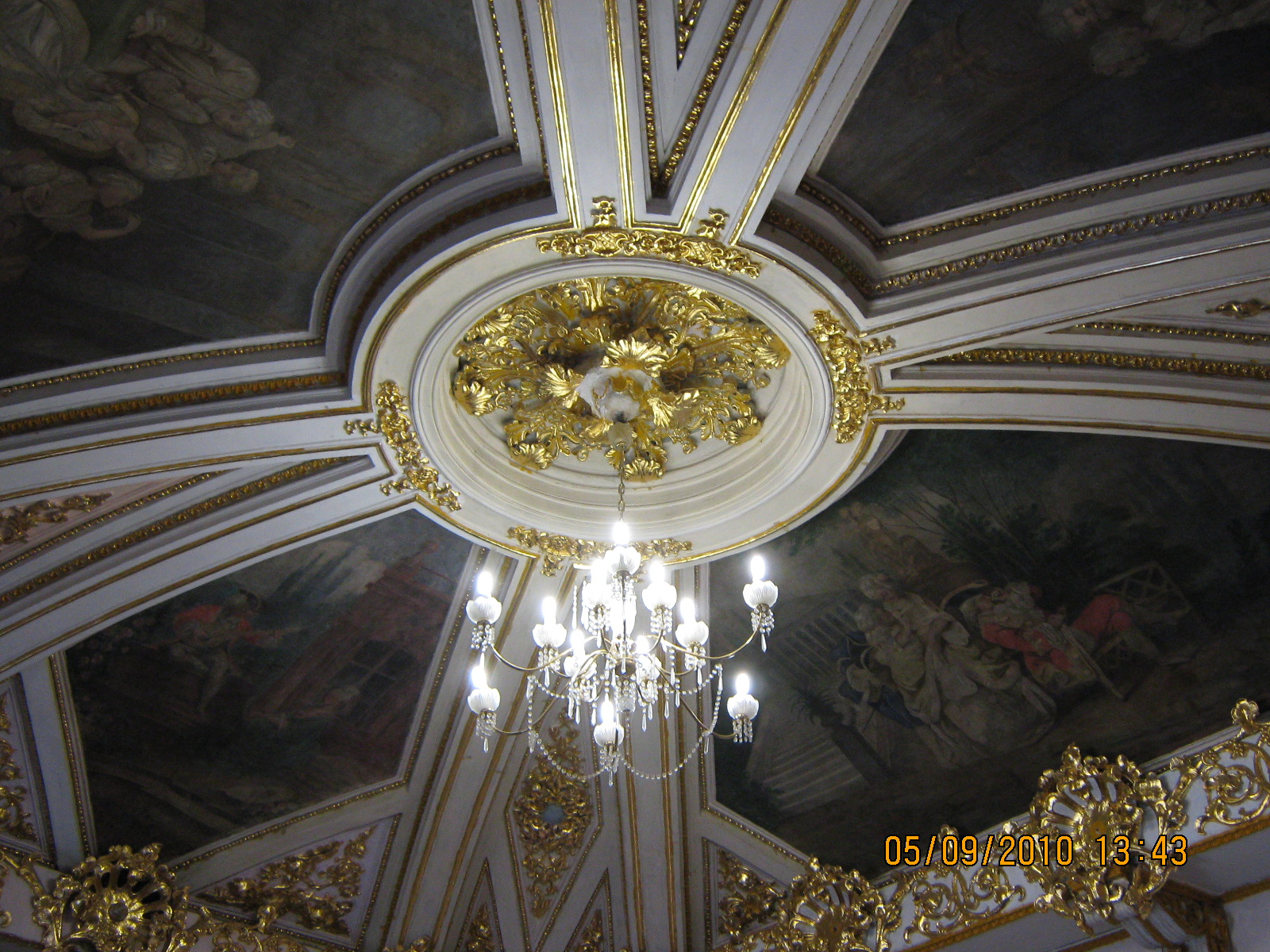
Ceiling of the main hall

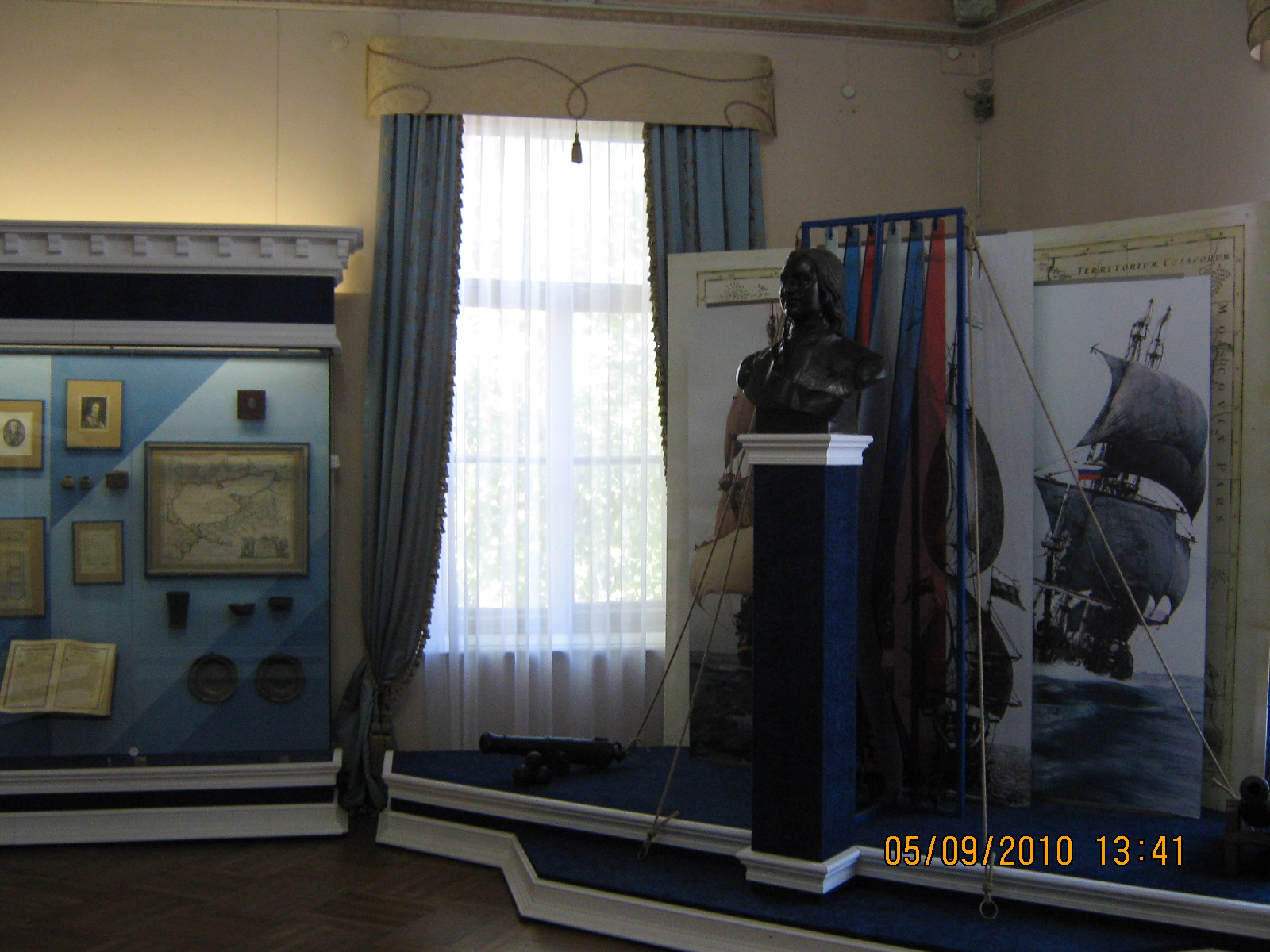
Hall of Emperor Peter I

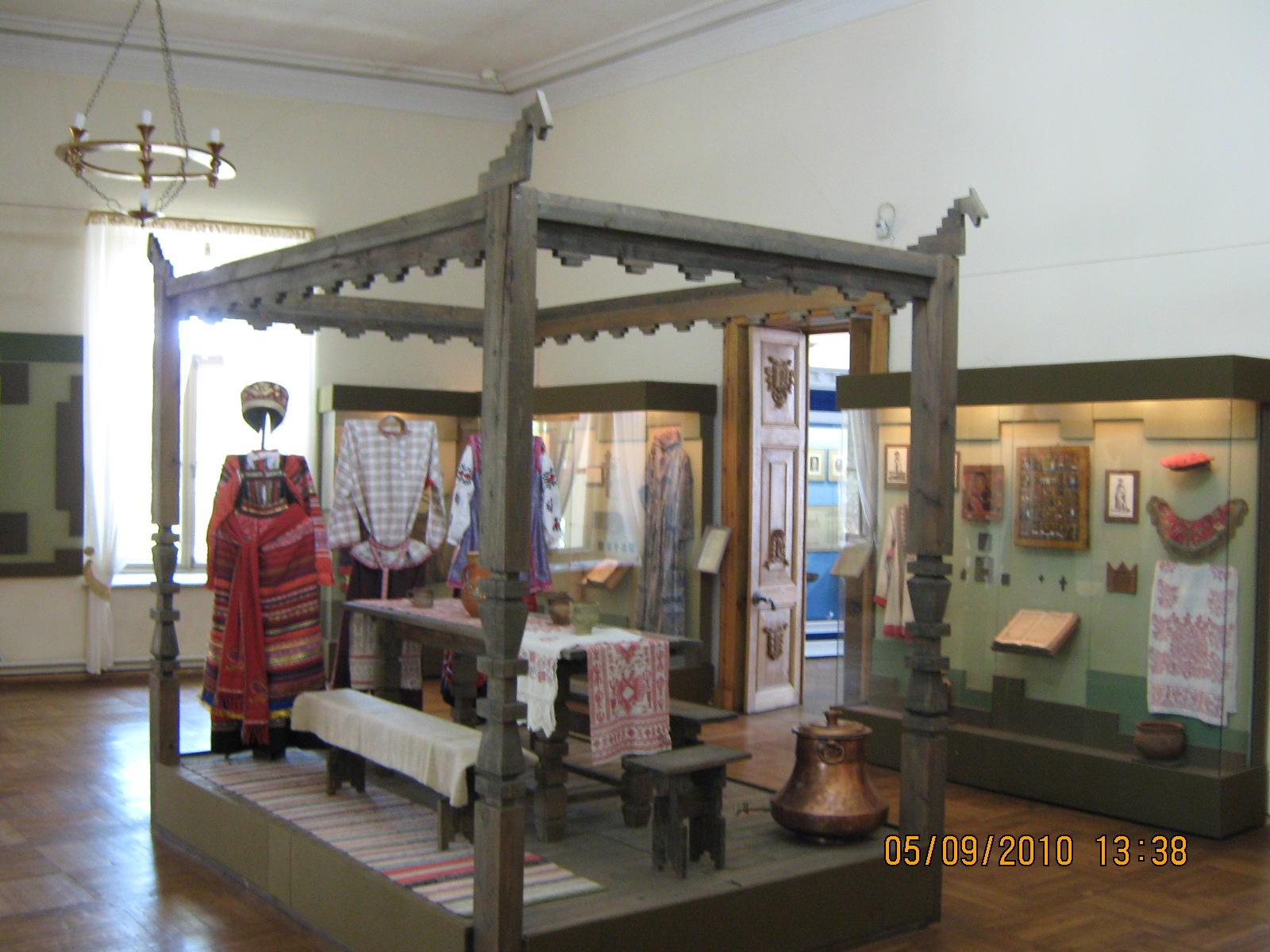
Hall of pioneering lands of Priazovye

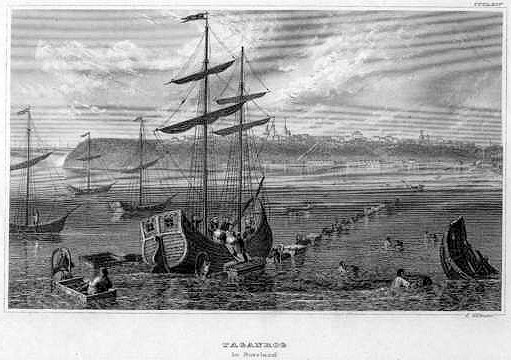
German lithograph Taganrog

== Links ==
- Таганрогский государственный литературный и историко-архитектурный музей-заповедник
- История музея
- Таганрогский государственный литературный и историко-архитектурный музей-заповедник
- Музей А.А. Дурова
- Дом-музей писателя И.Д. Василенко
