= A.P. Chekhov Literary Museum =

Museum in Taganrog, Rostov, Russia

Coordinates: 47.2155°N 38.9213°E

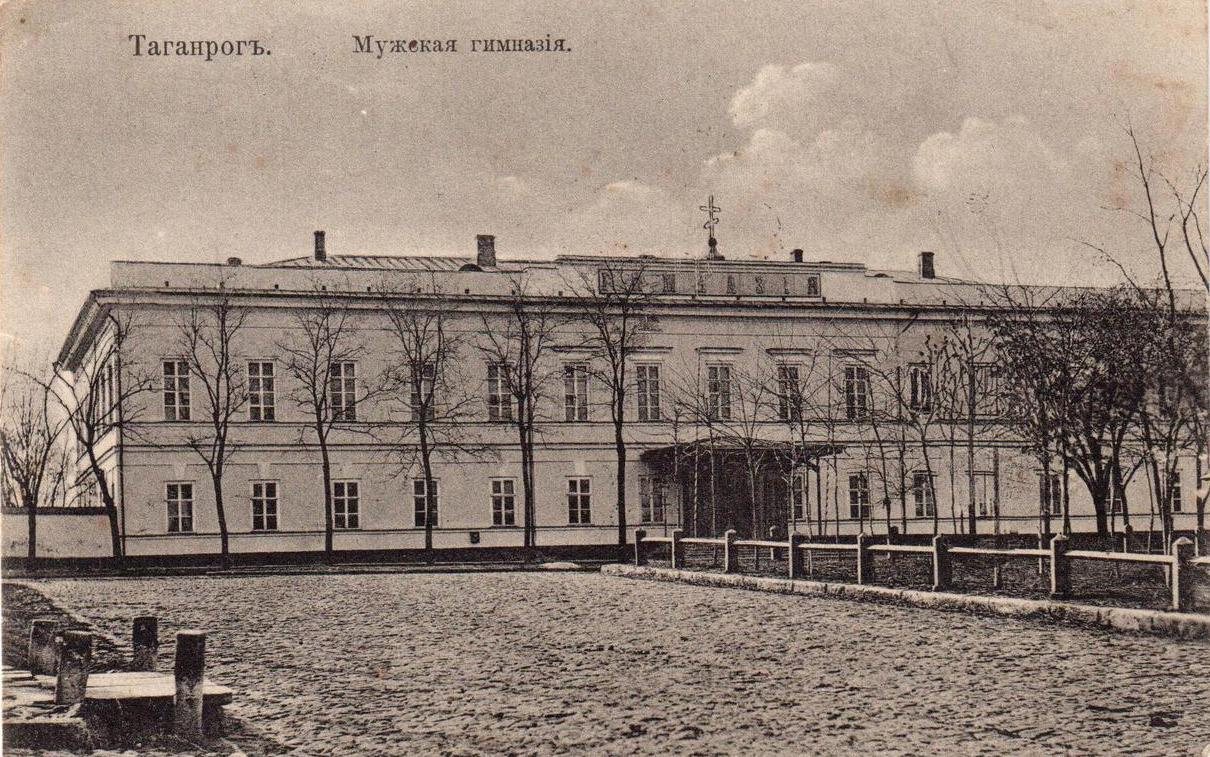
- The building of the male gymnasium is in Taganrog (now the A.P. Chekhov Literary Museum).
- Established: 1935
- Location: Taganrog, Russia

The A.P. Chekhov Literary Museum (Russian: Литературный музей А.П. Чехова) is a museum in Taganrog, Rostov Oblast, Russia. It is situated in the building of the former men's classical gymnasium, where Anton Chekhov studied. It is part of Taganrog State literary and historical-architectural museum-national park.

== History ==
The opening of the building of the male gymnasium was in 1843, the architect of the project was Francesco Boffo, the main style of the building was the direction of Russian provincial classicism. From 1868 to 1879, the student of this gymnasium was the famous Russian writer Anton Pavlovich Chekhov. The school functioned until 1975, and in 1980 it was decided to create a museum complex.

== Modernity ==
The exposition of the Museum represents a study of the life and work of Anton Pavlovich Chekhov and the influence of Taganrog on his works.

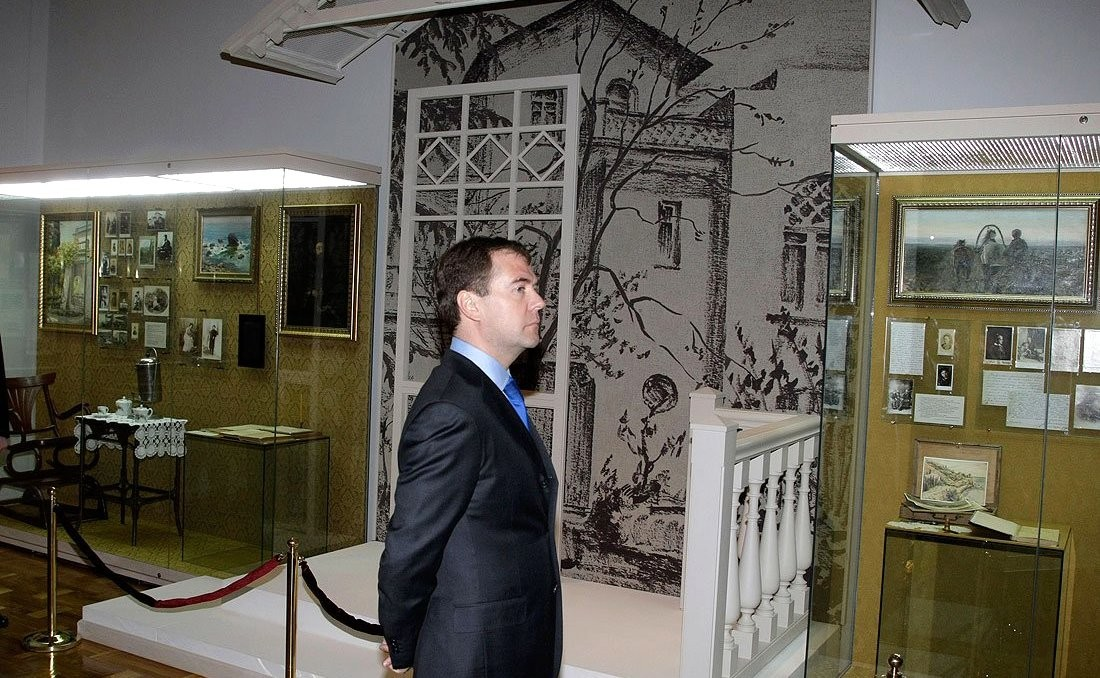
In the Literary Museum of A.P. Chekhov

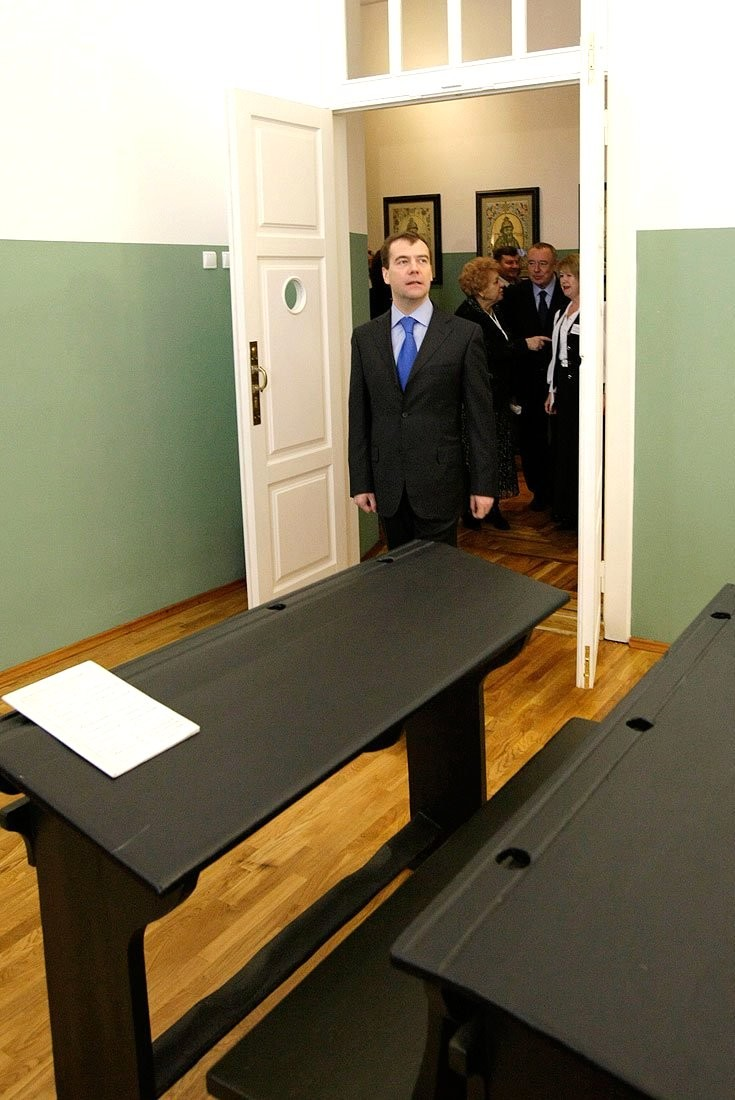
In the Literary Museum of A.P. Chekhov

== See also ==
- Birth house of Anton Chekhov
- Chekhov Shop
- Taganrog City Architectural Development Museum
