= Museum of I.D. Vasilenko =

House-museum in Taganrog, Rostov, Russia

Coordinates: 47.2097°N 38.9255°E

- Музей И. Д. Василенко (Russian)
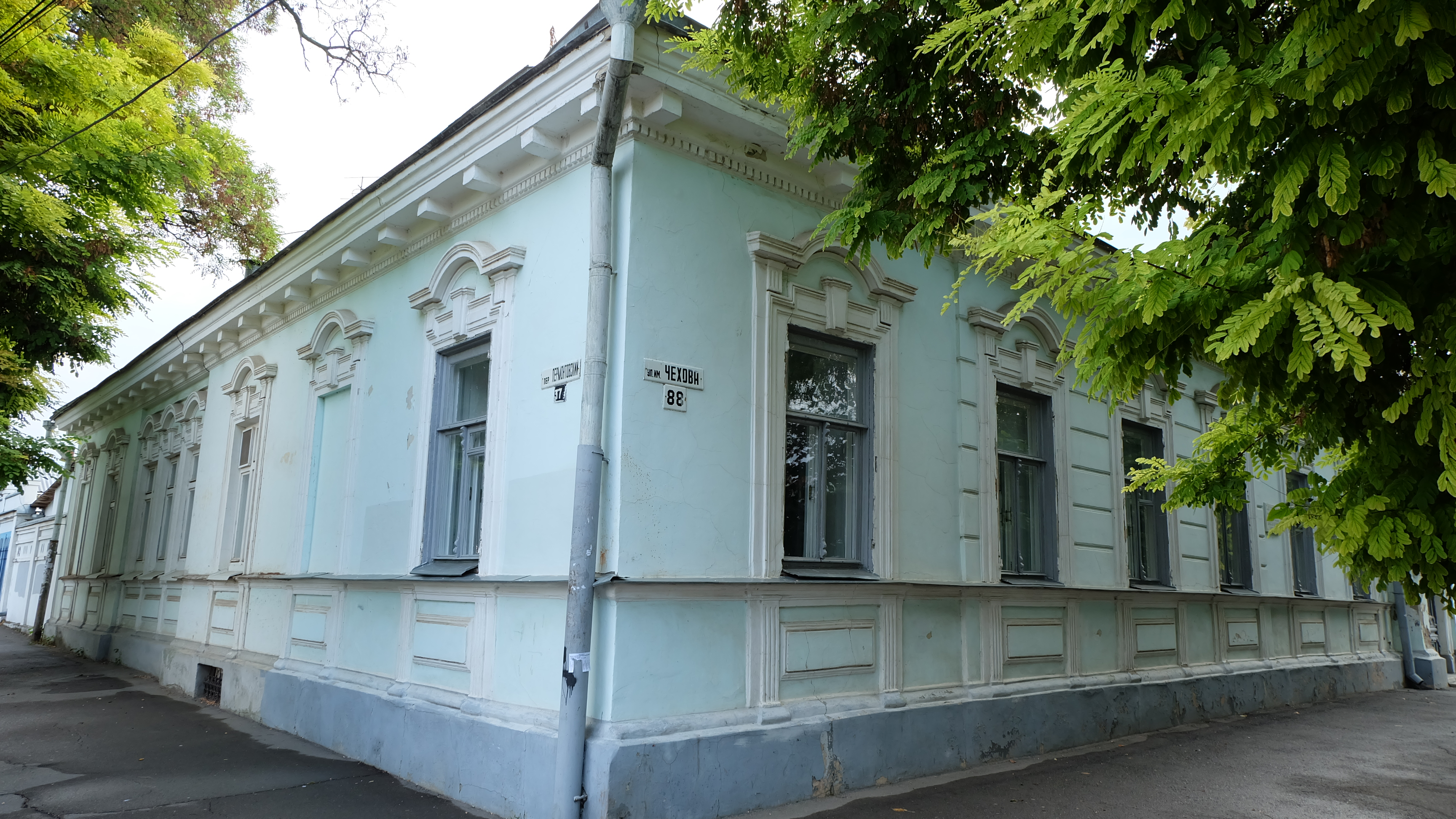

- Location within Russia
- Type: House-museum
- Location: Taganrog, Rostov Oblast, Russia

History
- Built: 2004

Museum of I.D. Vasilenko (Russian: Музей И. Д. Василенко) is a museum reserve in Taganrog, Rostov region, located in a house in which from 1923 to 1966 lived writer Ivan Dmitrievich Vasilenko, winner of the Stalin Prize. It is the part of the Taganrog State Literary and Historical-Architectural Museum-Reserve. It is located at Chekhov street, 88.

== History ==
The house where Ivan Vasilenko lived with his numerous family from 1923 to 1966 was built in 1906. It is an object of cultural heritage of regional importance. The writer was born on January 20, 1895, in the family of a volost clerk and seven years later moved with his parents to Taganrog from the village of Makeyevka. Here he lived all his remaining life, creating his works, and died on May 26, 1966, from tuberculosis. On the wall of the building there is a memorial plaque dedicated to the writer.

In 1988, the writer's former apartment was transferred to a museum-preserve. In May 2004 an exhibition was opened: the cabinet where the writer worked on his works, and the hallway. The exposition of the museum tells about the personal and public life of the writer, his entourage. There are various documents, photographs, personal belongings of Vasilenko, as well as materials that tell about the events of the beginning of the XX century in Taganrog. In 2008 was opened an exhibition dedicated to the "Cycle of works about Artemka".

The museum also presents an exhibition of the artist M.A. Sychev who was a friend of the writer.

In front of the house-museum stands the sculpture of Artemka, the main hero of Vasilenko's works. It is an image of a barefoot boy in a cap, clutching the casket in his right hand. The monument was installed in 2010, the sculptor is David Begalov.

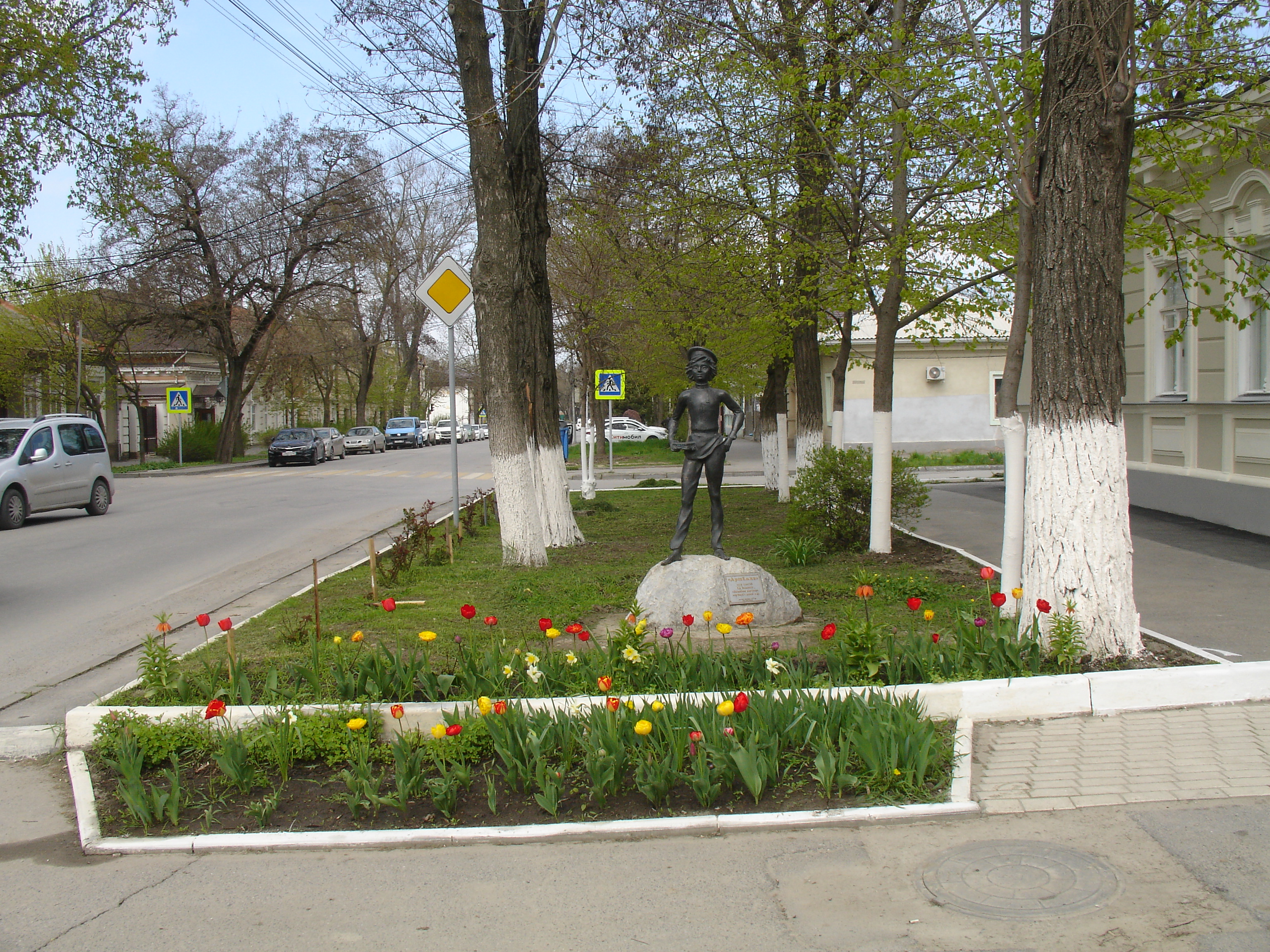
Sculpture of Artemka
