= Taganrog Fortress =

Historic fortress in Southwestern Russia

Coordinates: 47.2050°N 38.9500°E

Taganrog Fortress' Saint Trinity fortress Таганрогская крепость Троецкая крепость на Таганьем Рогу
- Taganrog, Russia
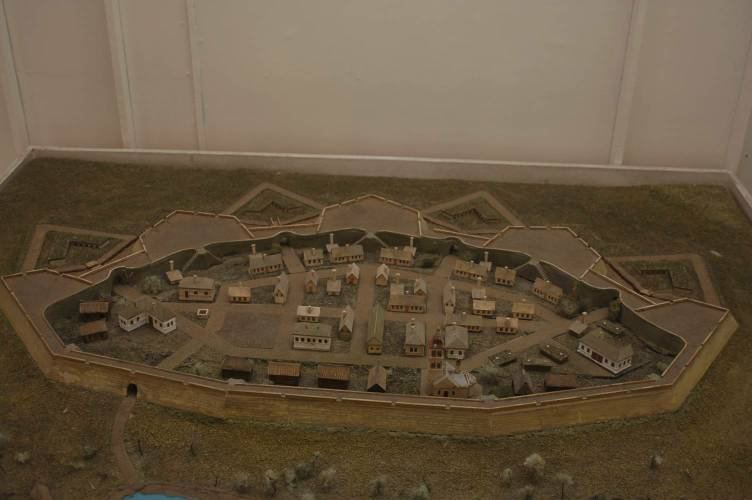
- Taganrog's fortress model in Taganrog City Architectural Development Museum

Site information
- Type: star fort
- Controlled by: Peter the Great, Aleksei Shein, Cornelis Cruys
- Condition: ruined

Site history
- Built: 1696-1709, 1769-1773
- Built by: Ernst Friedrich von Borgsdorf, Mikhail Dedenev
- In use: 1709-1712, 1769-1810
- Materials: earthworks

Taganrog Fortress (also The Saint Trinity fortress on Tagan-Rog Cape) was a star fort-style fortress built during the reign of Peter the Great and re-constructed by the order of Catherine the Great.

== Foundation of Taganrog ==
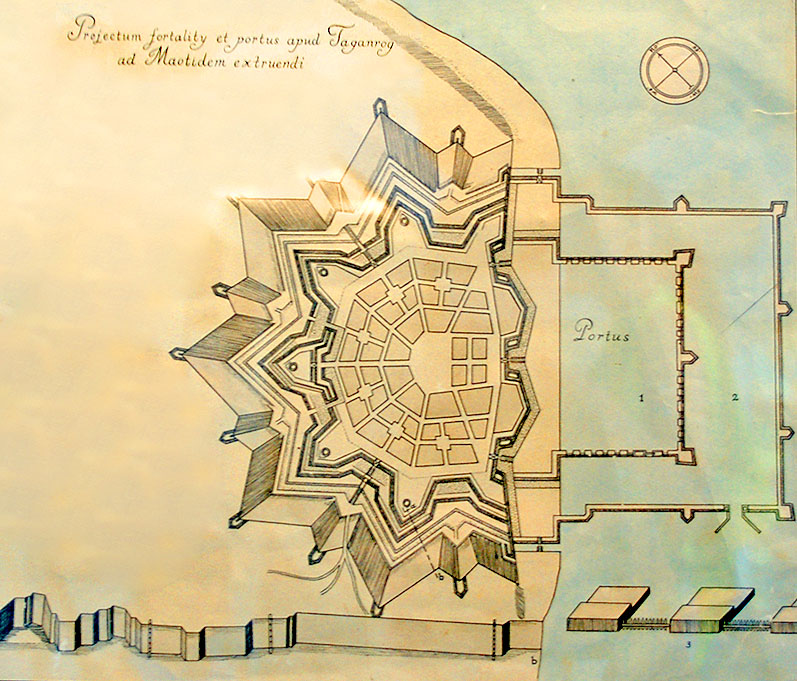
Plan of the Taganrog fortification and artificial haven

Peter the Great tried to conquer the Turkish fortress of Azov to get an entrance to the Sea of Azov and the Black Sea. His first Azov campaigns in 1695 failed, but his second attempt the next year led to victory.

To ensure Russian positions in the South, and to shelter the Russian Navy, Peter the Great needed a new haven for the Azov Flotilla, and a fortress to protect it. Azov could not serve as naval base because of shallow waters of the river Don. That is why, a few days after Turkish capitulation, on July 27, 1696 the Russian tsar set out for an expedition to explore the coastline of Azov Sea. The expedition stopped at the cape Tagan-Rog on July 27, where Peter the Great spent the night of July 27–28, 1696. The cape was selected as the perfect place for the harbour, since the sea around the cape was deep enough for sea boats; there was enough room for a haven with solid stone soil; and the expedition found a small water spring.

The first Russian Navy base, Taganrog (Taygan for Turkish in Ottoman sources) was officially founded by Peter the Great on September 12, 1698. Vice-Admiral Cornelis Cruys, who is regarded as the architect of the Russian Navy, became the first Head of Taganrog city in 1698-1702 and in 1711, and produced the first maps of Azov Sea and Don River.

== Construction of the fortress ==
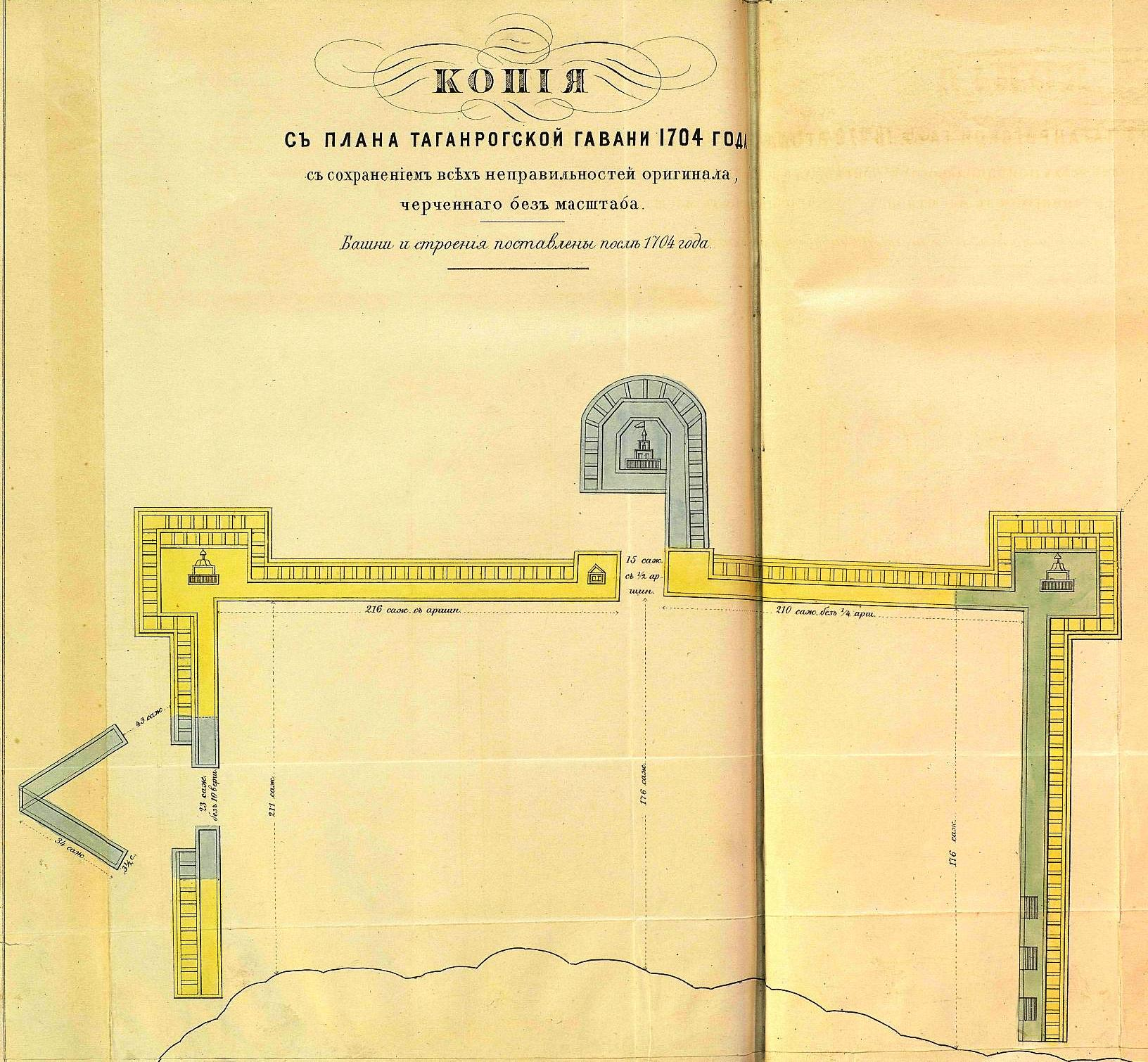
Plan of Taganrog's haven, 1704.

The project for planning and building works in the city was established in 1698 by Austrian engineer Baron Ernst Friedrich von Borgsdorf, basing on the instructions provided by Peter the Great. Taganrog is one of the first Russian cities, which was built according to a detailed pre-established plan. It was also the first artificial haven, and the first fortress made of earth as primary material. The construction was generally completed by 1709.

The Saint Trinity fortress was situated on the horn-shaped territory of the cape, earth mounds around 8 metres high, a 5-metre-deep moat that stretched for about 2 miles. Within fortress ramparts were other defensive constructions - three bastions, two demi-bastions, three ravelins armed with cannons and howitzers. Alongside the rampart were casemates, powder magazines, barracks. To prevent an eventual attack from the land there was an additional dry ditch 40 metres wide and 5 metres deep alongside the rampart.

Inside the fortress territory was laid out in a radial pattern of star fort united by the central plaza. It had monarch's house, various buildings, Saint Trinity cathedral, warehouses, marketplace, ovens and draw wells. By the middle of 1711 there were 206 buildings made of stone and 162 wood structures inside the fortress for garrison and inhabitants in case of a siege. The main part of the population lived outside the fortress in the so-called "slobodas". In 1711 the fortress was defended by 293 cannons and 40 howitzers not counting artillery in the haven and on Cherepakha Islet.

Taganrog haven's water area was about 774 thousand sq.metres, of rectangular form and was surrounded breakwaters. From the seaside were erected towers, the berth was near the coast. Taganrog seaport is considered as the first port in the world to be created in the open sea and not in a natural bay. Some 30 thousand oak piles were used in the construction of the haven with 199 boxes loaded with stones in between them.

Another part of this project was an artificial islet Cherepakha, which was made in the Azov Sea in about 2 kilometers from the fortress. The islet was 59 by 38 metres. There was a citadel, which had an area of 1200 square metres with 127 cannons. In the middle stood a wooden izba for garrison, which was later replaced by a stone building.

The islet was built by the personal order of Peter the Great in 1701-1706 of rock fill held by oak piles. In the present days, when the tide is low and blows East wind the islet emerges from the water. During the latest examination of islet in 1981, the remains of old oak piles were still present.

After a defeat suffered by Russian troops from Ottoman Empire during Pruth River Campaign, the Russian tzar had to sign Treaty of the Pruth, returning Azov to Turkey and destroying Taganrog. On September 19, 1711 by the order of Peter the Great, Taganrog was demolished and in February 1712 Russian troops left the town.

== Short revival ==
For fifty years, the seaport, fortress and town lay in ruins. On April 2, 1769, Russian troops entered Taganrog, and it was definitively ceded by Turkey in the Treaty of Kuchuk Kainarji (1774). The city was re-founded by Catherine the Great, who issued a special decree addressed to the Vice-Admiral Aleksey Senyavin. The reconstruction of the fortress was planned by Russian engineer Mikhail Alexeevich Dedenev.

However after the Crimea was annexed by Russian Emprire in 1783, Taganrog Fortress lost its military importance and February 10, 1784, Empress Catherine I signed a decree abolishing the fortifications and transferring the lands in favor of the city. The ships of the Azov Flotilla were transferred into the new city and navy base of Sevastopol, and later in 1803 the bells and plates of the Saint Nicholas Church, including The bell of Chersonesos, were also given in favor of a naval cathedral in Sevastopol.

Taganrog continued its development as a civic trade city. The fortress buildings were used for various purposes and were gradually demolished.

== See also ==
- Peter barracks (Taganrog) ― part of Taganrog Fortress.
