= Peter barracks (Taganrog) =

Coordinates: 47.2034°N 38.9414°E

- Петровские казармы
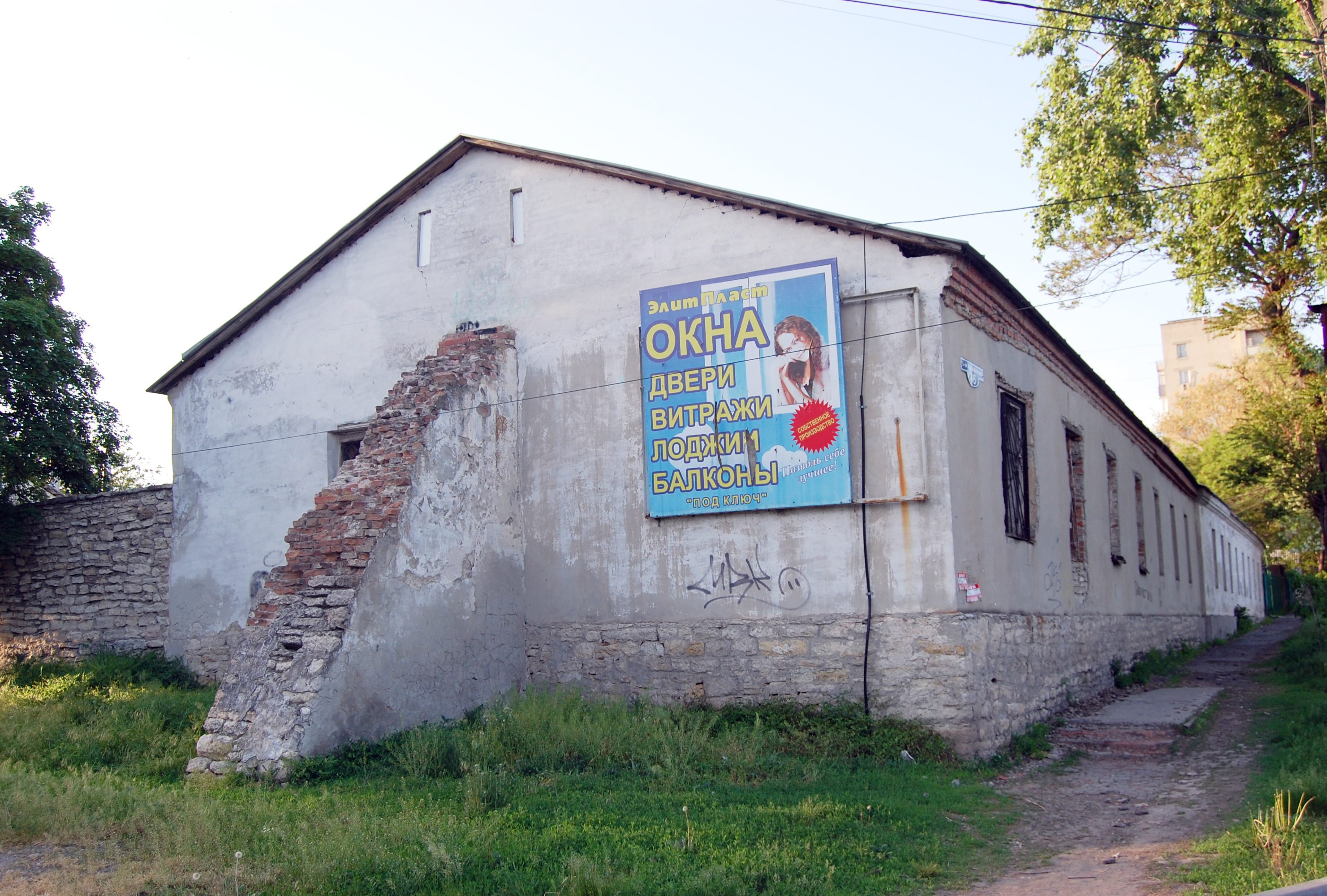
- Photo of barracks, 2012
- Location: Taganrog
- Type: Museum of local history

Peter barracks (Russian: Петровские казармы) — a historical monument in Taganrog, Russia, that was built at the end of the 18th century. Is a part of «combined arms cell» of Taganrog Fortress. It is also a valuable object of cultural heritage of federal importance.

== History ==
On 7 December 1803, the garrison battalion of st. Dmitry of Rostov Fortress were moved to Taganrog. It was planned to form there a regiment that would consist of two battalions, so the construction of new barracks for this purpose began. Nowadays only one «standard» building still stands.

In the 1910s the building was occupied by a penitentiary orphanage. In the 1920s there was a prison for juvenile offenders. In 1937 the buildings were redesigned for living spaces.

== Museum ==
By 1998, the barracks were a property of Taganrog Historical-Architectural Reserve and local cossack organization. There are plans for restoration and establishment of the museum called «Taganrog Fortress Barracks». Soldier barracks, officer hall, kitchen, powder magazine and well are to become part of museum complex.

In 2007 town's administration discussed an idea of establishing «Naval Glory Museum». This proposal was rejected because «it found no support in the Ministry of Culture of Rostov oblast». This proposal was rejected because «it found no support in the Ministry of Culture of Rostov oblast».

In January 2012, the administration of Taganrog decided to establish museum center «Peter barracks» and merge it with Faina Ranevskaya Museum and Alexander I Museum. The project will be called «Taganrog Museum Complex». Establishment is estimated to be finished by 2018.
