= Artyomka Monument =

Monument of Artyomka
- Russian: Памятник «Артёмка»
- Interactive map of Monument of Artyomka
- Location: Chekhov St., 88 Taganrog, Rostov Oblast, Russia
- Designer: David Begalov
- Material: bronze
- Opening date: 2010
- Dedicated to: honor of the famous literary hero of the writer I.D. Vasilenko.

Monument of Artyomka (Russian: Памятник «Артёмка») is the sculptural composition in Taganrog created by the sculptor David Begalov in honor of the literary hero of the writer I.D. Vasilenko.

== Sculptural composition ==
Bronze figure of a barefoot boy in a cap is installed on the pedestal in raw granite boulder. In his right hand he squeezes a small box, described in the opening story by Ivan Vasilenko "The Magic box" (1937)

== Creation history ==
The monument to the literary hero Artyomka of Ivan Vasilenko was opened in Taganrog in May, 2010 in front of the House-Museum of the writer to the address Chekhov St., 88. The Opening was timed to the 115 anniversary since the birth of the writer.

== Vandalism ==
On the night of September 13, 2010, the monument along with the pedestal was turned upside down by unknown vandals and its head was broken. The vandals did not seem to pursue material goals, because they threw the beaten head of the bronze boy near the turned monument. On the night of August 27, 2012, the figure of Artyomka was torn from the pedestal. The unknown tried to drag the monument, but something seems to have prevented them. The police found the monument at a certain distance from the installation site.
