= White Dacha =

Anton Chekhov's house in Yalta, Crimea

Coordinates: 44°29′28″N 34°08′30″E

- Белая дача
- Established: 1898
- Location: 112 Kirova st., Yalta, Crimea
- Type: Memorial house
- Collection size: Anton Chekhov's family objects, photographs, literary material
- Architect: L.N.Shapovalov
- Website: A.P. Chekhov House-Museum in Yalta, official website

Immovable Monument of National Significance of Ukraine
- Official name: Будинок, в якому жив письменник А. П. Чехов (Building where poet A. P. Chekhov lived)
- Type: History
- Reference no.: 010034-Н

The White Dacha (Russian: Белая дача; Ukrainian: Біла дача) is the house that Anton Chekhov had built in Yalta and in which he wrote some of his greatest work. It is now a writer's house museum.

== Building ==
The White Dacha was built in 1898 following Chekhov's success with The Seagull. He took up residence there after his father's death and to aid him with coping with tuberculosis. Chekhov planted a variety of trees including mulberry, cherry, almond, peach, cypress, citrus, acacia and birch. He also planted roses such as 'Cheshunt Hybrid', 'Cramoisi Supérieur', 'Gloire de Dijon', 'La France', 'Madame Joseph Schwartz', 'Madame Lombard', 'Princesse de Sagan', Rosa banksiae f. 'Lutea', 'Souvenir de la Malmaison', 'Turner's Crimson Rambler'..., and kept dogs and tame cranes.

The house was designed by L.N. Shapovalov. Aleksandr Kuprin described the house as follows,

It was, perhaps, the most original building in Yalta. It is all white, pure, easy, beautifully asymmetrical, ... with a tower, and unexpected ledges, with a glass veranda below and an open terrace above, with scattered broad and narrow windows... ".

V.N. Ladygensky mentioned that "a dacha in Crimea, in Autka, near Yalta, was validly constructed, excellent". From the study one can see the seafront that inspired "The Lady with the Dog", and at the back the scene that inspired the setting of The Cherry Orchard is visible. He also wrote the Three Sisters and The Bishop on the site.

== Museum ==
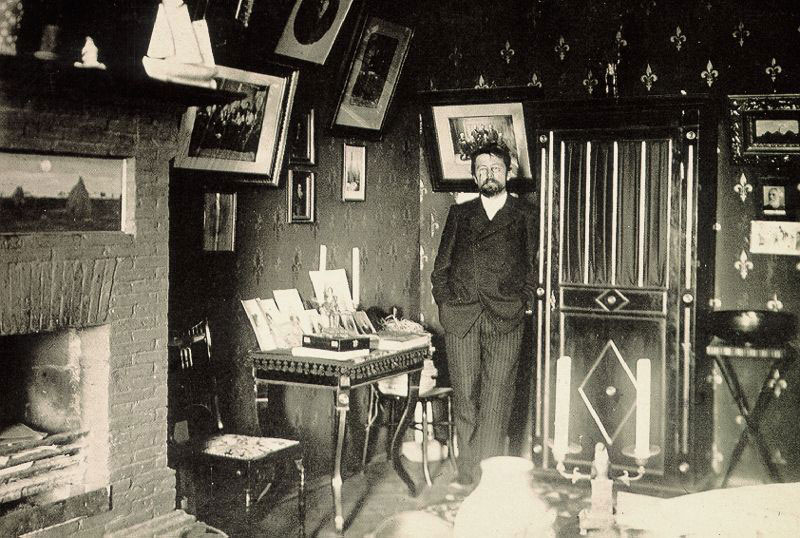
Chekhov in the study at the White Dacha

After Chekhov's death his sister Maria looked after the house until 1921 when it became a museum. During the Nazi occupation, Maria Pavlovna refused to leave and put up pictures of German dramatist Gerhart Hauptmann. Maria refused to let a German officer move into her brother's rooms and prevented his belongings from being looted. The house was damaged by one of the last air raids on the area by the Luftwaffe.

=== Museum funding issues ===
The Soviet government, as with other such heritage sites, diligently looked after the house but following the dissolution of the Soviet Union, the responsibility for the house's upkeep came under dispute. Crimea became an autonomous republic within Ukraine. The museum falls under the jurisdiction of the Ministry of Culture of the Crimean Autonomous Republic and their budget is extremely small. The Ukrainian state authorities would like the Russian government to pay for upkeep since Chekhov was Russian, but the Russians do not agree. The house has now become dilapidated. On May 11, 2010, Ukrainian President, Viktor Yanukovych, ordered that repairs and restoration work be carried out on the house.

== Noted visitors ==
Chekhov was a noted host and entertained Leo Tolstoy, Feodor Chaliapin, Sergei Rachmaninoff, and Maxim Gorky at the Dacha. Leonid Kuchma and Vladimir Putin and their spouses visited the museum in 2003.

== See also ==
- Birthhouse of Anton Chekhov
- Melikhovo, home and museum

== Further sources ==
- Bartlett, Rosamund (2004) Chekhov: Scenes from a Life (London: Free Press)
- Chute, Patricia (1998) "Anton Chekhov: The House in Yalta and the Final Years", Harvard Review, No. 15 (Fall), pp. 119–123
