= Cherepakha Islet =

Artificial islet at the Sea of Azov

Native name: Черепаха (Russian)
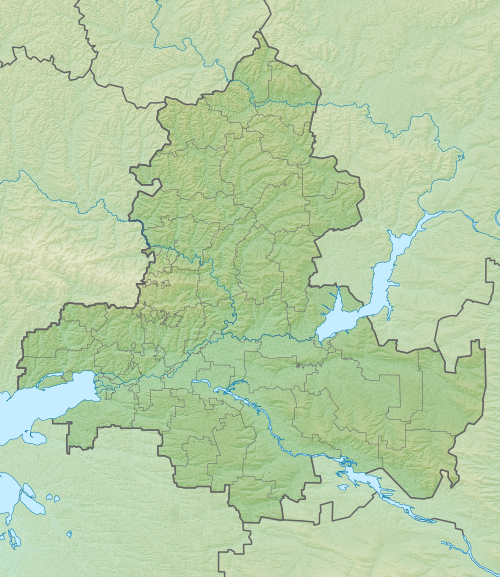
- Location within Rostov Oblast Location within Black Sea

Geography
- Location: Azov Sea
- Coordinates: 47°12′N 39°00′E

Administration
- Russia

Cherepakha or Cherepashka (literally "The Turtle") was a small artificial islet, which was man-made on a sand bank in the Gulf of Taganrog on Azov Sea in about 2 kilometers from the Taganrog Fortress. Its sole purpose was to support the fortification with cannons thus creating additional defense for the Azov Flotilla.

== History ==
The islet was built by the personal order of Peter the Great in 1701-1706 of rock fill held by oak piles. It was oval-shaped and measured 59 by 38 meters. There was a citadel, which had an area of 1200 square meters with 127 cannons. In the middle stood a wooden izba for garrison, which was later replaced by a stone building. The part of the islet above water level was covered with white limestones. The name Cherepakha (the Turtle) is due to the many seashells laid in its foundation when the sand bank was being raised.

After a defeat suffered by Russian troops from Ottoman Empire during Pruth River Campaign, the Russian tsar had to sign Treaty of the Pruth, returning Azov to Turkey and destroying both Taganrog Fortress and Cherepakha Islet. On September 19, 1711 by the order of Peter the Great, Taganrog was demolished and in February 1712 Russian troops left the town.

After the next Russo-Turkish war, the Treaty of Niš was signed stipulating the return of the territory to Russia but without the right to reconstruct the Taganrog Fortress. In 1746 a Russian customs post was established on the cape Tagan-Rog and a patrol was placed on Cherepakha Islet.

In the late 18th century the city of Taganrog lost its military and strategic importance and the citadel was not reconstructed. In 1776 a temporary quarantine control was established on the islet.

In 1845 a wooden lighthouse was mounted on Cherepakha, which was in its turn replaced by a metal lighthouse in 1894.

In the present days, when the tide is low and blows East wind, the islet emerges from the water. It is known to be one of the favorite fishing spots in the Gulf of Taganrog. During the latest examination of islet in 1981, the remains of old oak piles were still present.

In November 1992 the islet was entered into the Rostov Oblast's register of protected architectural monuments.
