= Taganrog Museum of Architecture and Urbanism =

Museum of local history in Ulitsa Frunze, Taganrog, Russia

- Музей «Градостроительство и быт города Таганрога»
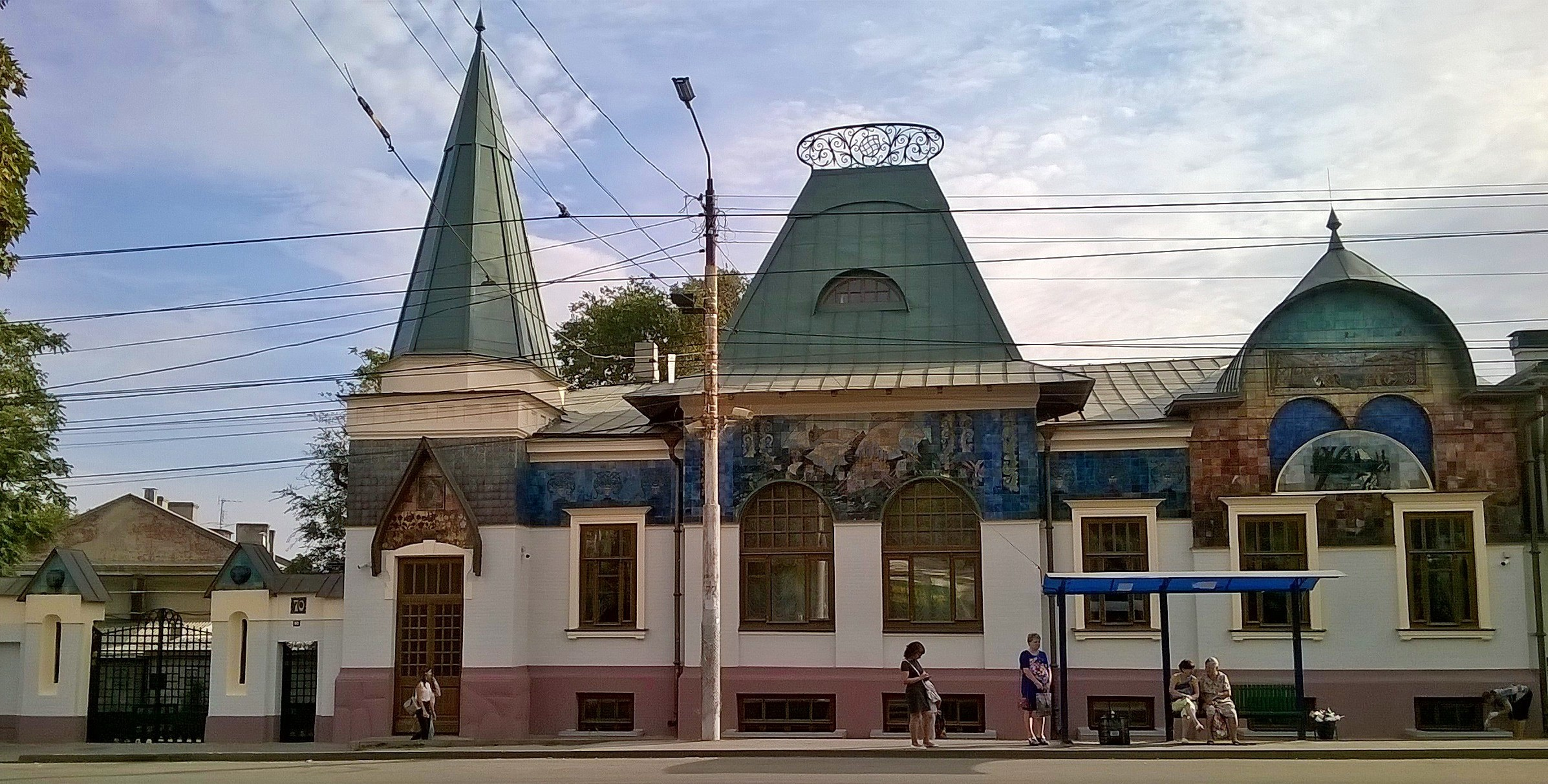
- Established: November 3, 1981
- Location: Ulitsa Frunze 80, Taganrog
- Coordinates: 47°13′07″N 38°55′16″E
- Type: Museum of local history
- Directors: Mrs. Marianna Yevgenievna Grigoryan (Russian: Григорян, Марианна Евгеньевна)
- Architect: Fyodor Schechtel's studio
- Public transit access: "The Palace of Culture of Combine-Builders" tram and bus stop

Taganrog Museum of Architecture and Urbanism is a museum in the city of Taganrog, Russia. The building was designed by the architect Fyodor Schechtel's studio.

== The building ==
The Taganrog Museum of Architecture and Urbanism is located in the former house of Sharonov, which represents a scaled-down model of the Moscow Yaroslavsky railway station and remains one of the best examples of Art Nouveau style architecture in Taganrog. The building was constructed in 1912 upon a project designed by Fyodor Schechtel's architectural studio. It is in the federal list of cultural heritage sites. The main value of the building is in its ceramic panels produced by the Abramtsevo workshop based on sketches by such artists as Nicholas Roerich, Mikhail Vrubel and Viktor Vasnetsov.

== Museum collection ==
The new museum was established in 1981 to focus on the development of Taganrog's town-planning, historical buildings and its residents' modes of life from 17th century up to present times. Today it is part of Taganrog State Museum-Preserve of Literature, History and Architecture.

June 25, 2019 the museum was reopened with a new updated exhibit entitled "A Time-Lapse Portrait of the City".

== Gallery ==
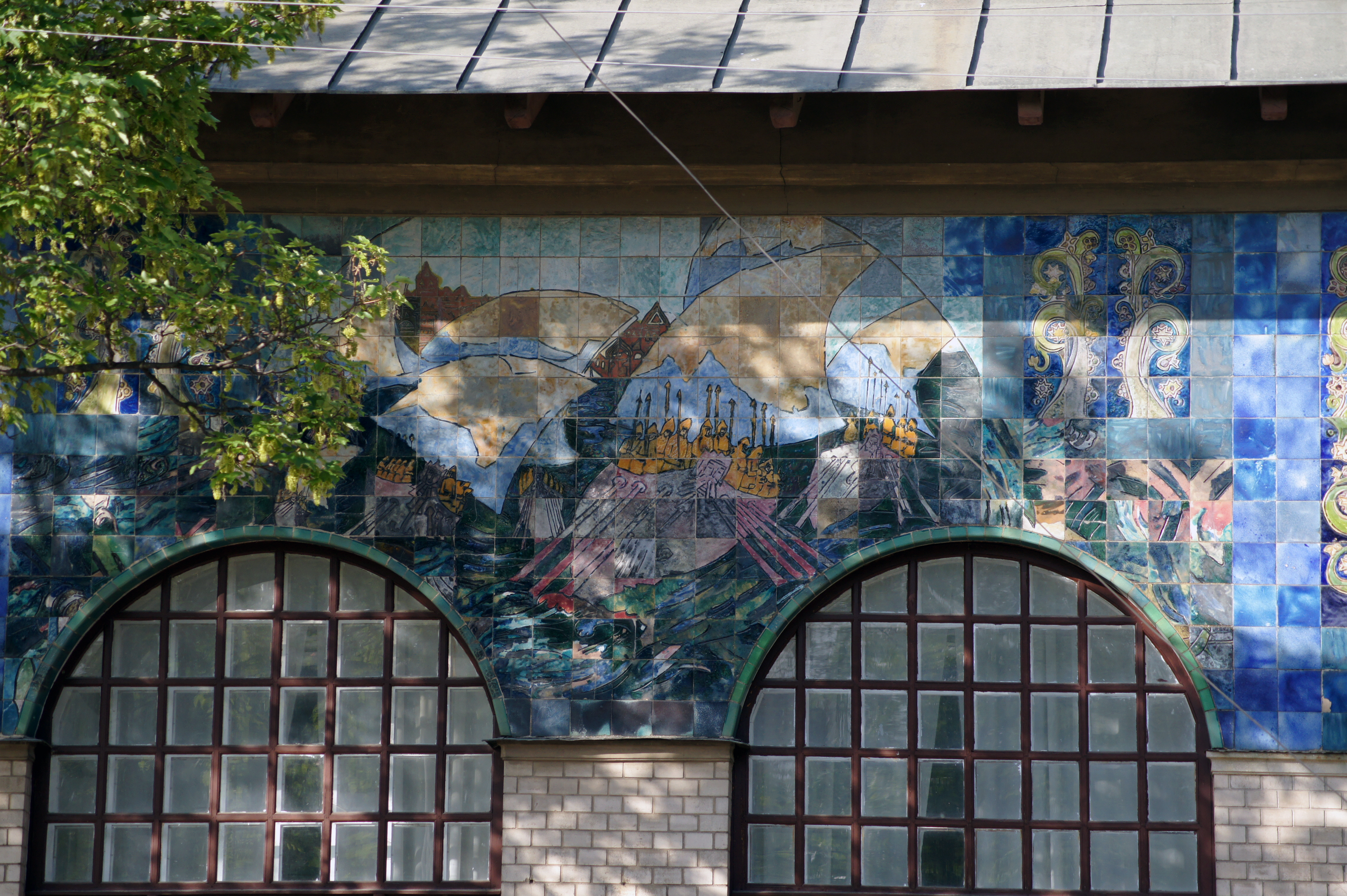
Отплытие ладей by Nicholas Roerich from the majolica panel

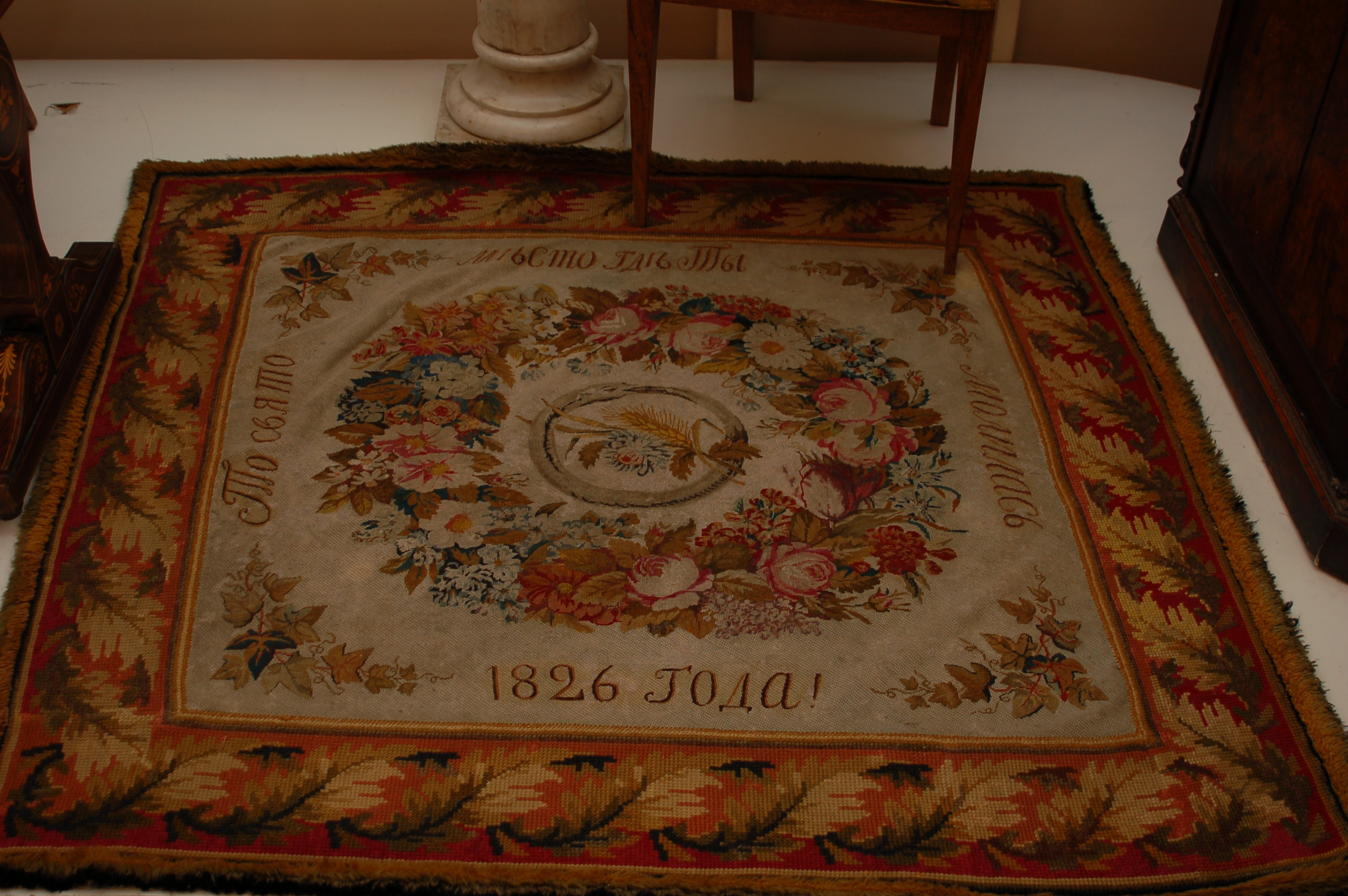
Carpet on which Elizabeth Alexeievna (Louise of Baden) stood to pray after death of Alexander I of Russia from Alexander I Palace. Now in the collection of Taganrog City Development Museum. The inscription on the carpet reads "Blessed Be the Place where You Prayed. 1826!"

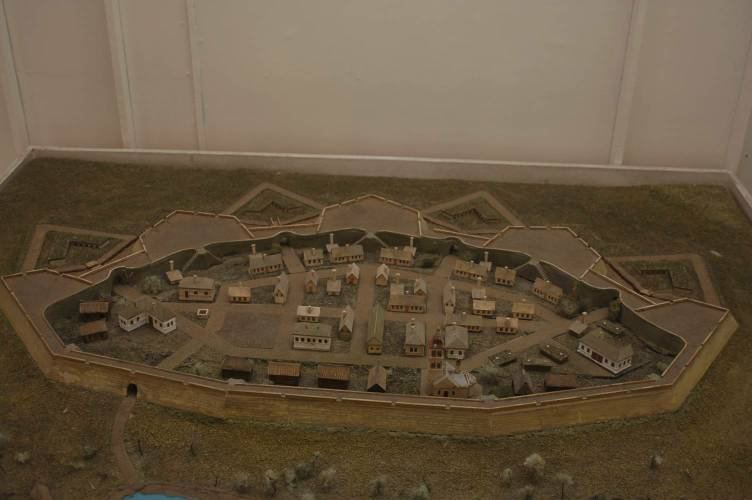
The model of the Taganrog Fortress from the collection of the Taganrog City Architectural Development Museum

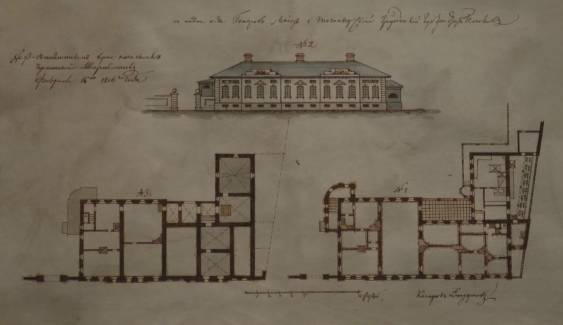
Photograph of the original plan of the Pyotr Papkov's mansion in Taganrog, later to become the Alexander I Palace
