= The Durov Museum =

Museum in Taganrog, Rostov, Russia

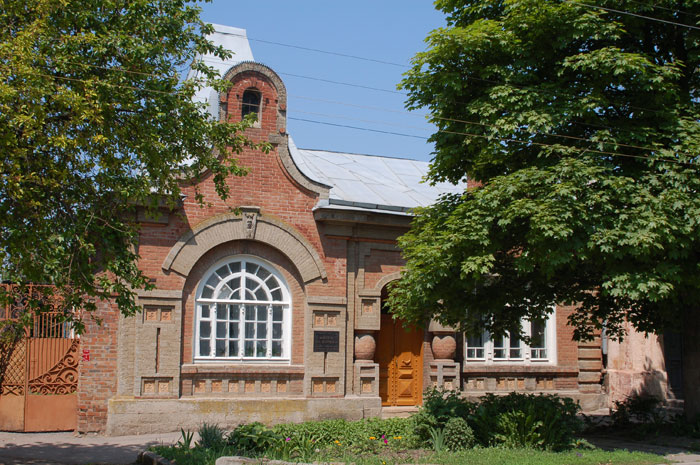

- Location within Rostov Oblast
- Established: 1987
- Location: 44, Anton Glushko's lane, Taganrog, Rostov oblast, Russia
- Coordinates: 47°12′32″N 38°55′21″E
- Director: Elizaveta Vasilevna Lipovenko

The Durov Museum is a circus art museum in Taganrog, Rostov Oblast, Russia, dedicated to the famous trainer, artist, one of the most famous representatives of the circus dynasty of Durov, Anatoly Anatolyevich Durov. It is part of the Taganrog State Literary and Historical-Architectural Museum-Reserve.

== Description ==
Already known in Russia and abroad as a trainer, Anatoly Anatolyevich Durov moved with his family (his wife, mother, two sisters with their families) and animals to Taganrog in 1926. In the city, he bought two mansions: on the Shevchenko Street, 107 and another - on the same street, but under number 111. In 1928, the artist died in Izhevsk. His family remained in Taganrog for another 12 years.

In 1987, the exposition dedicated to Anatoly Anatolyevich Durov was opened in the mansion. The building in which the museum is located is made in the Art Nouveau style. The mansion was built in 1900. There are also features and elements of the traditional Russian style in its appearance. Until 1915 the estate belonged to the priest G. F. Potseluev, then the house became the property of the wife of the collegial assessor A. I. Tsarenko, before the revolution the mistress of the mansion was Olga Mironosnichenko, the sister of Sasha Selivanova, the old friend of Anton Chekhov, and since 1920 the house has been nationalized. The facade is divided into two parts by a modestly decorated entrance in the form of a low arched niche with barrel-shaped columns, often found in the guise of Russian churches. A large window to the left of the entrance is decorated with curtain-shaped eaves. There is a kind of pilasters on the sides of the window. Above the cornice of the arched form there is a tall pediment with a small window, and there is a metal roof with a crest of a trapezoidal shape behind it. The second part of the building is much smaller, slightly removed from the red building line deep into the manor, and has one complicated window. The corner of the facade is rusticated. The building is built of white and red bricks. Having many features of Art Nouveau, the mansion, thanks to its small dimensions and barrel-like columns, leaves an impression of a house made in the traditional Russian style. In 1988, the restoration of the mansion was carried out.

The exposition of the museum tells about the creative path, the methods of animal training, numerous foreign tours, the world recognition of the illustrious trainer, his pupils and followers. In the middle of the central hall "Arena" there is a stylized circus arena, on which stuffed artists Anatoly Durov (reading crane, monkey, playing the violin, parrot, singing gypsy romances, and others) are exhibited. This area arouses the special interest of visitors. In one of the halls of the museum, a fragment of the interior of the coach of the touring artist of the early 20th century was recreated, and Anatoly Anatolyevich's personal belongings were presented. In the hall "Kino" a unique documentary recording of the movie frames of the attraction "Cabaret", made in the 1920s, is demonstrated. On the preservation in the museum there is a collection of stuffed exotic animals and birds (more than 40 copies), authentic circus posters of Durov's performances: "Kangaroo Boxer", "Dog's Wedding", "Jazz Band", "Fox with the Rooster", "Dog Jockeys" and so on, letters, critics' reviews, photographs, fragments of the film recordings. There is a documentary material connected with the Durov family on the glass showcases. First of all, these are different old photographs.
