= Chekhov Shop =

Biographical museum in Taganrog, Russia

Coordinates: 47.2160°N 38.9180°E

The Chekhov Shop
- Музей "Лавка Чеховых"
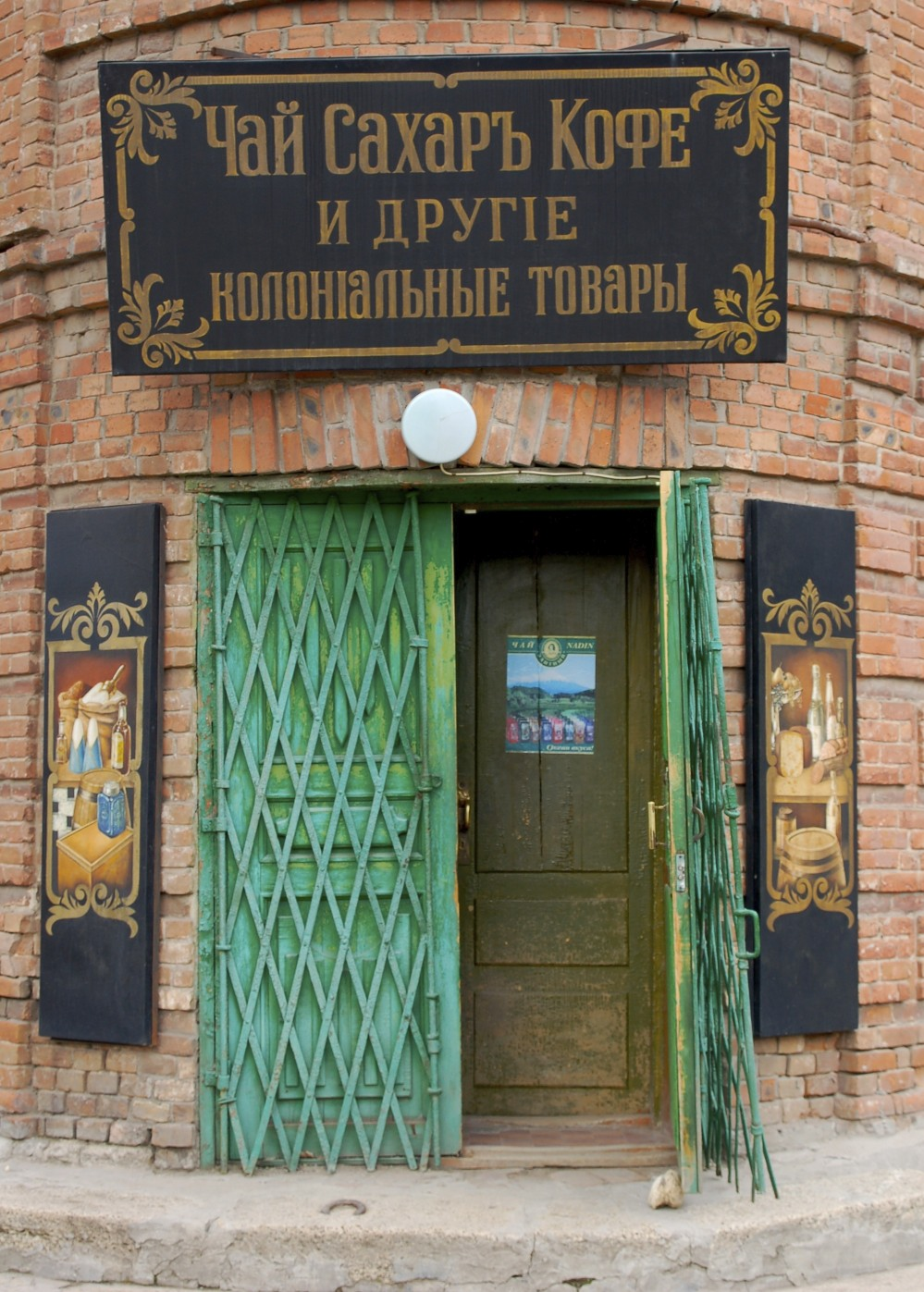
- The old sign on the entrance reads "Tea, sugar, coffee, and other colonial goods"
- Established: 1977
- Location: Ulitsa Alexandrovskaya 100, Taganrog
- Type: memorial house
- Directors: Yevgeniya Petrovna Konoplyova; Коноплева, Евгения Петровна

The Chekhov Shop is a museum in Taganrog, Russia. This is a two-storey house where the Russian writer Anton Chekhov stayed with his family from 1869 to 1874. Opened on November 3, 1977 the Chekhov Shop exhibits objects and documents related to Chekhov youth years and the life of the Chekhov family.

It is one of the three museums associated with the Russian writer in that city.

== Photographs ==
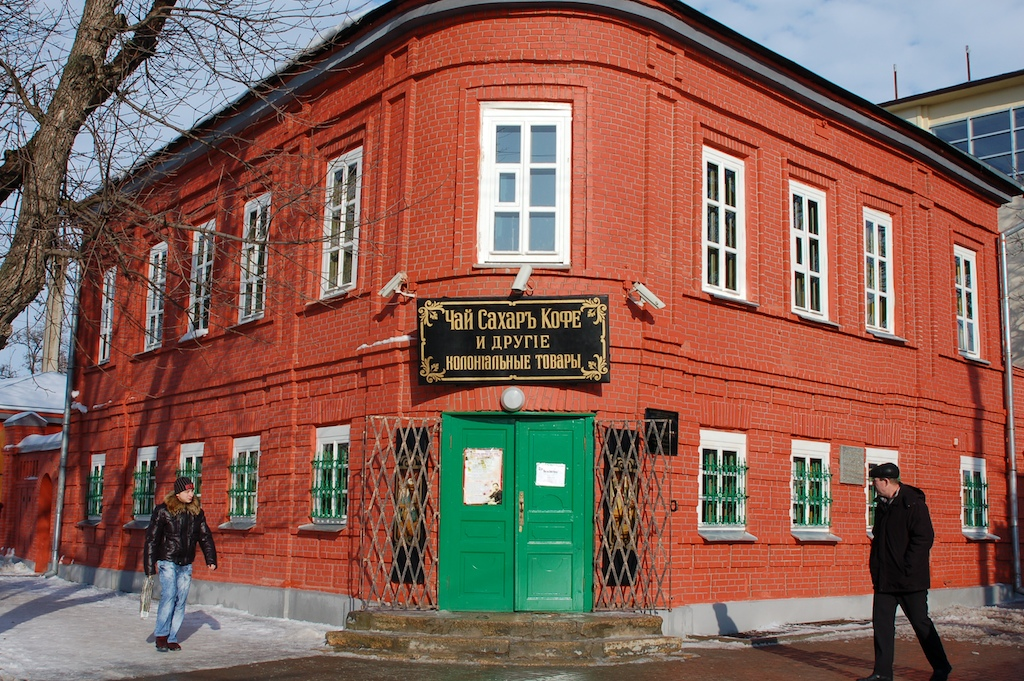
The Chekhov Shop museum after renovation in 2010, during the Chekhov 150th birth anniversary celebrations in Taganrog

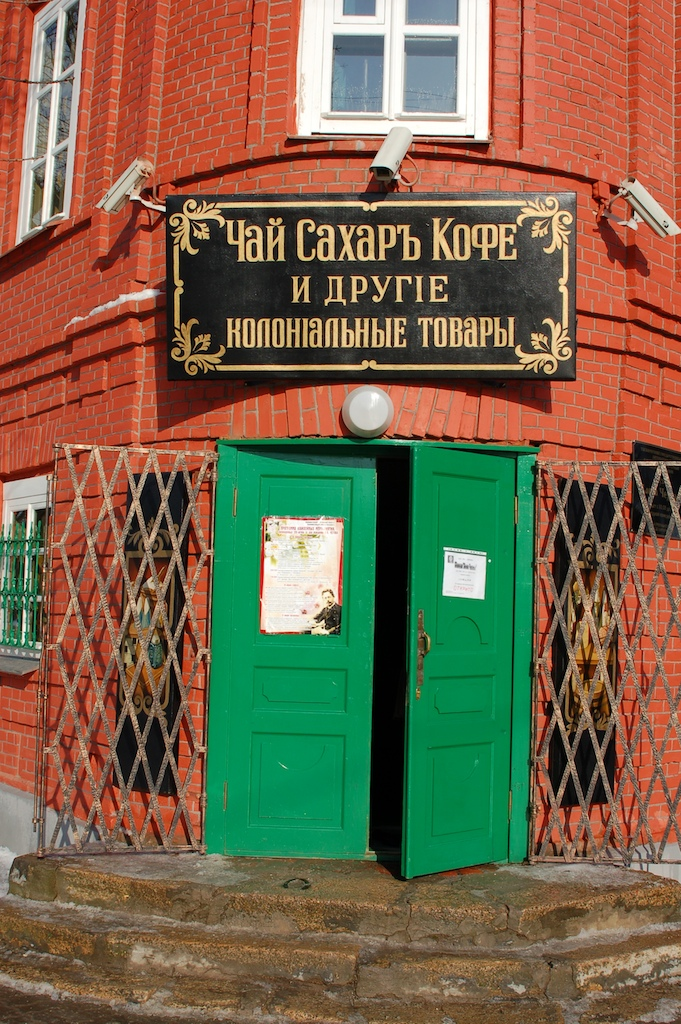
The shop's entry sign reads "Tea, sugar, coffee, and other colonial goods"

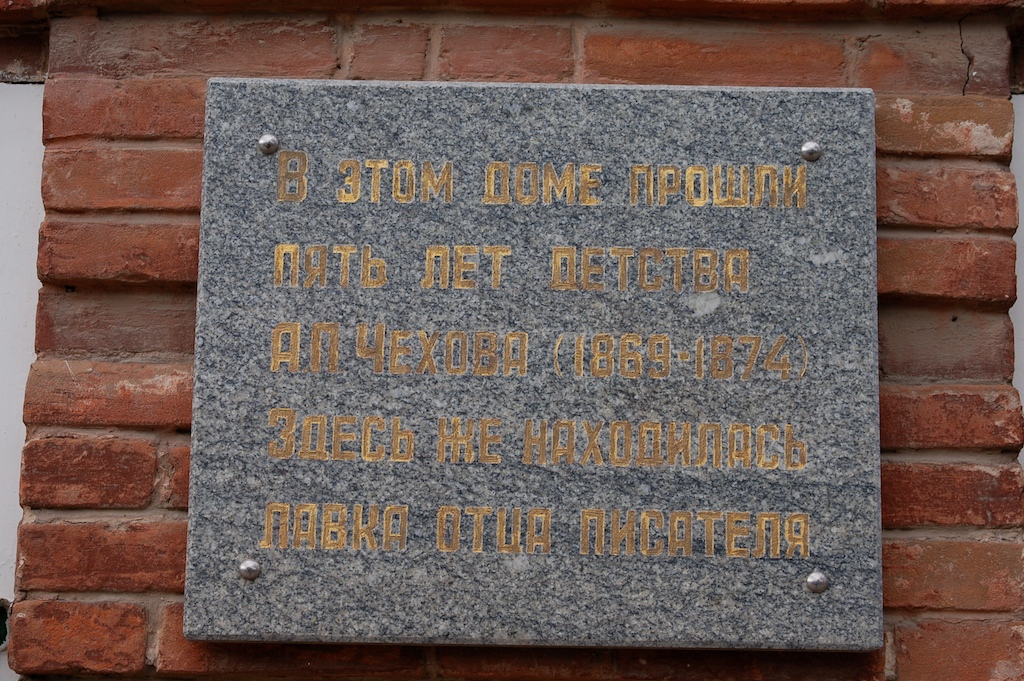
Memorial plaque on Chekhov Shop museum. The inscription reads:"In this house Anton Chekhov spent 5 years of his childhood (1869-1874).And in this same building the writer's father kept his shop."

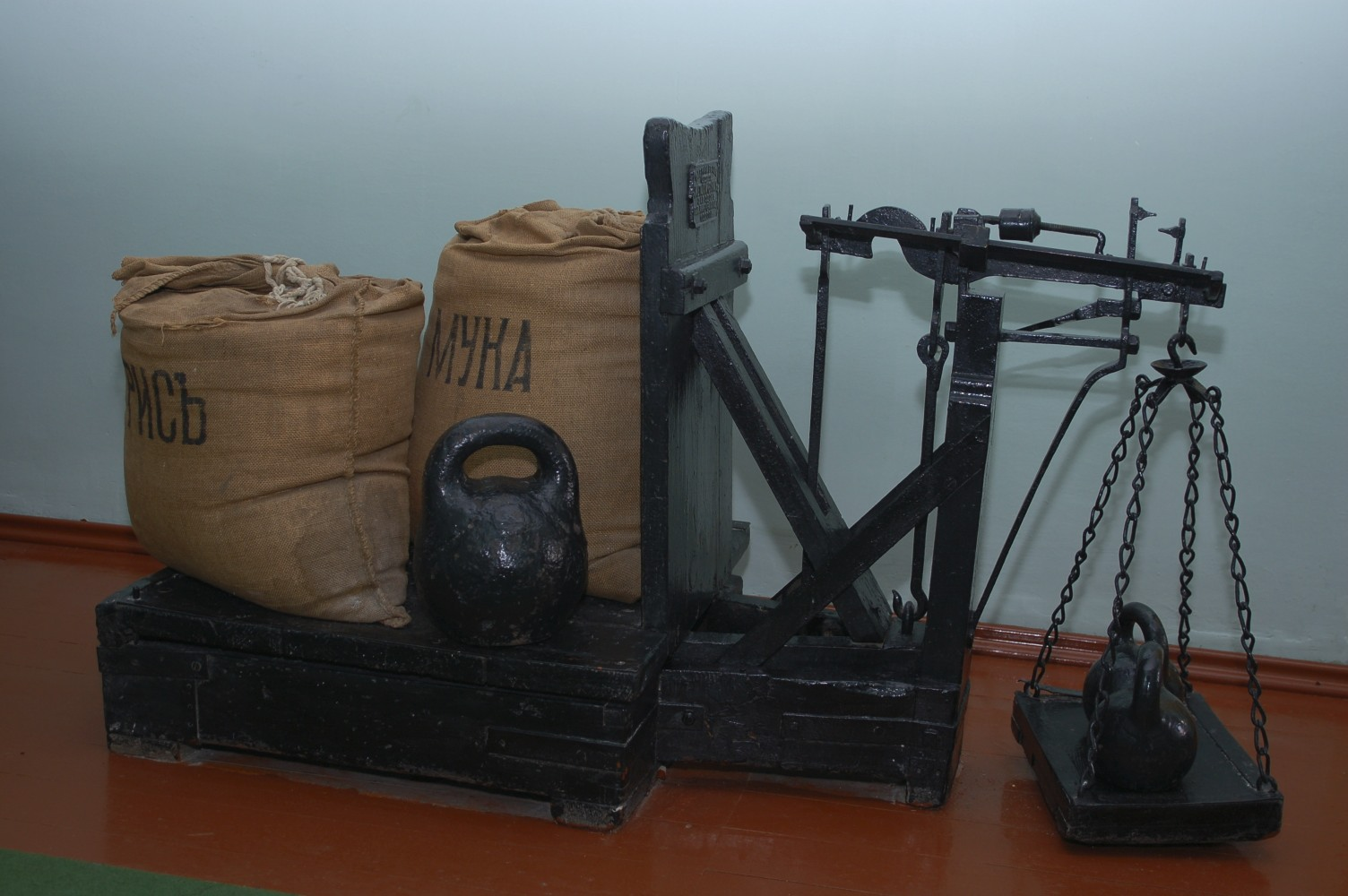
Old weights

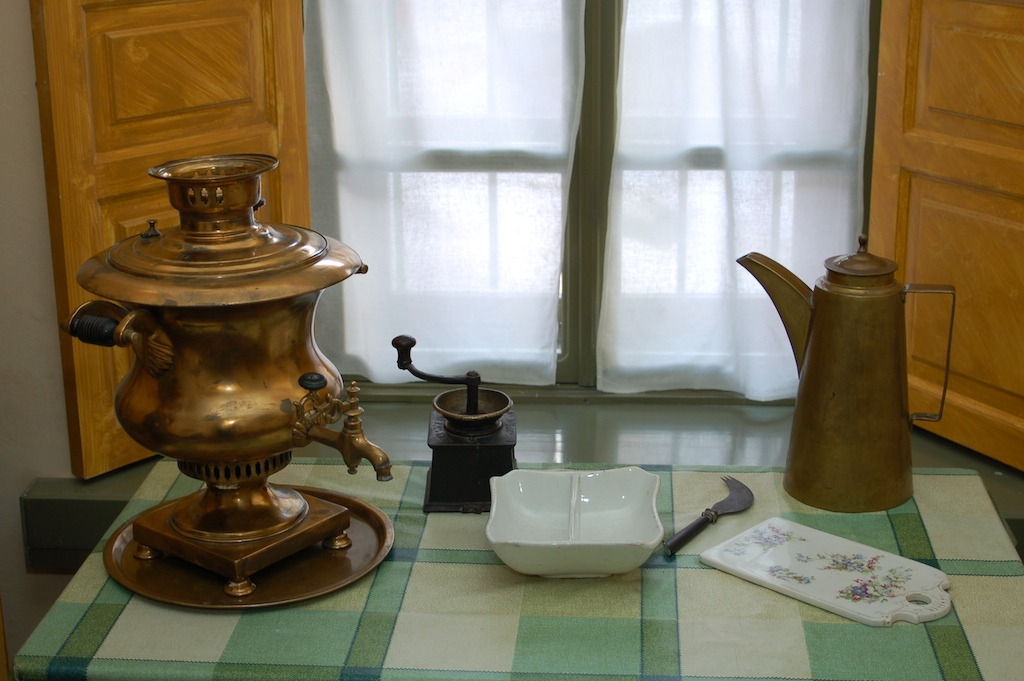
Samovar, coffee grinder and coffee pot. Collection of the Chekhov Shop memorial museum.

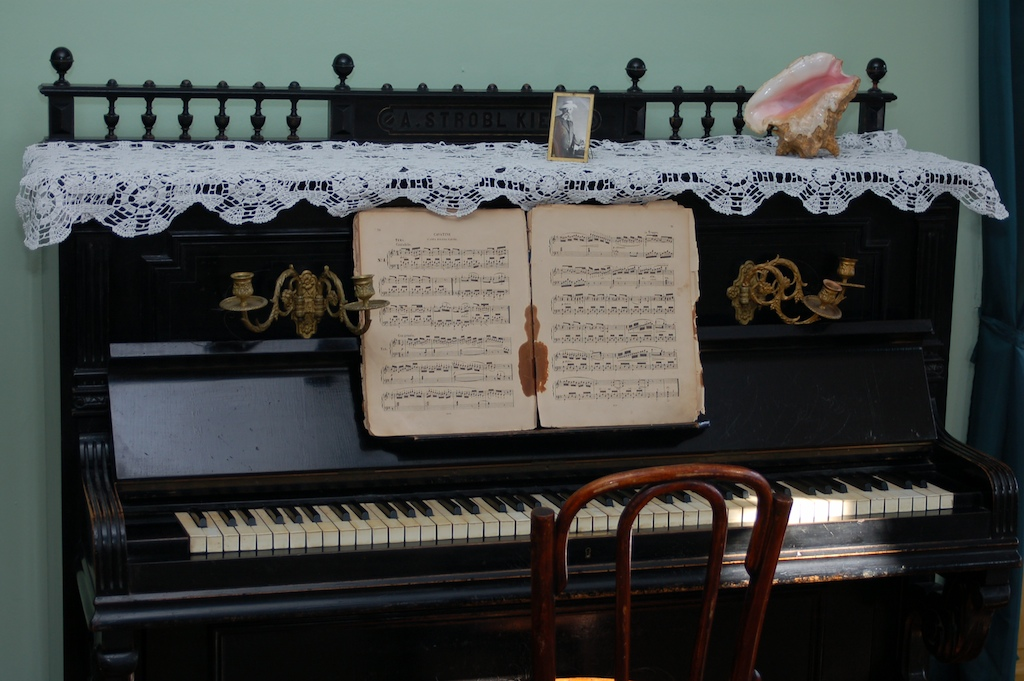
Chekhov family's piano from the collection of the Chekhov Shop memorial museum

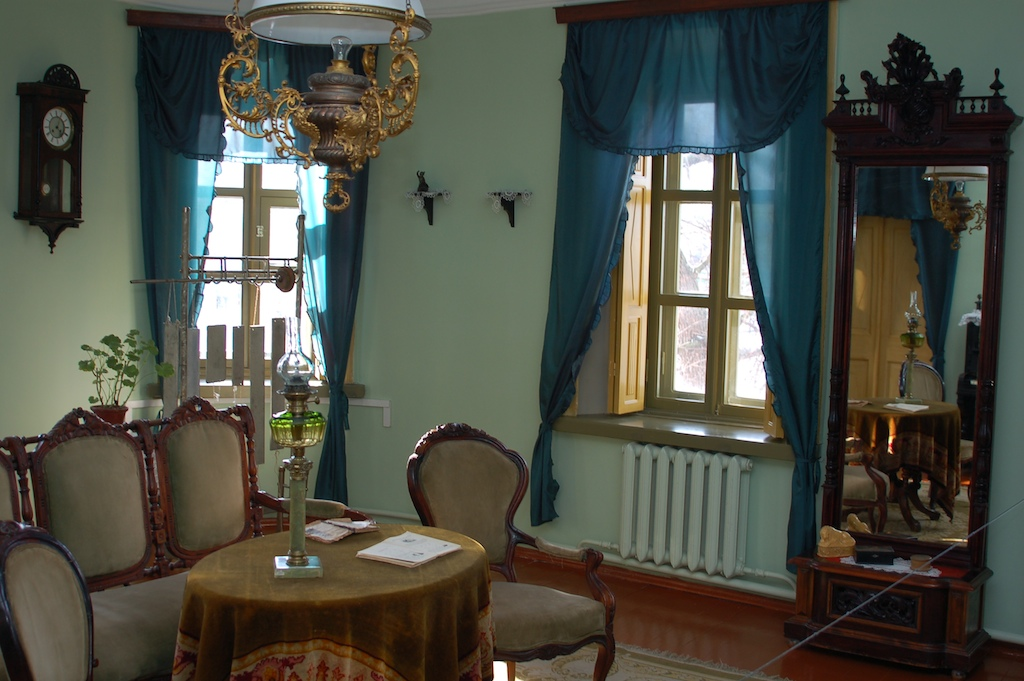
The drawing room at the Chekhov Shop museum
