= Birthplace of Anton Chekhov =

Historic house in Taganrog, Russia

Coordinates: 47°12′25″N 38°55′53″E

- Музей "Домик Чехова"
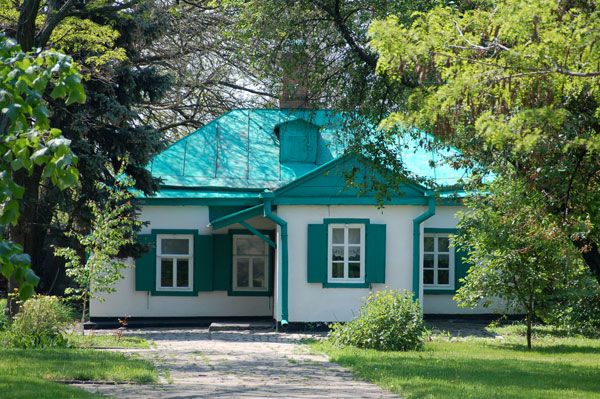
- Established: 1924
- Location: Ulitsa Chekhova 69, Taganrog
- Type: memorial house
- Collection size: Anton Chekhov's family objects, photographs, merchant documents of Chekhov's father
- Directors: Yelizaveta Vasilievna Lipovenko; Липовенко, Елизавета Васильевна

The birthplace of Anton Chekhov is a historic house in Taganrog, Russia, where the writer Anton Chekhov was born. It is now a writer's house museum. In 1916, the Taganrog City Council supported the initiative of the Chekhov Circle and acquired the house and grounds on Chekhov Street 69 to conserve the house of Anton Chekhov. In December 1920, the house was freed from all tenants, and a renovation followed in 1921.

As part of the celebrations marking the 150th anniversary of Chekhov's birth, Russian President Dmitri Medvedev visited the House memorial museum on January 29, 2010.

== Photos ==
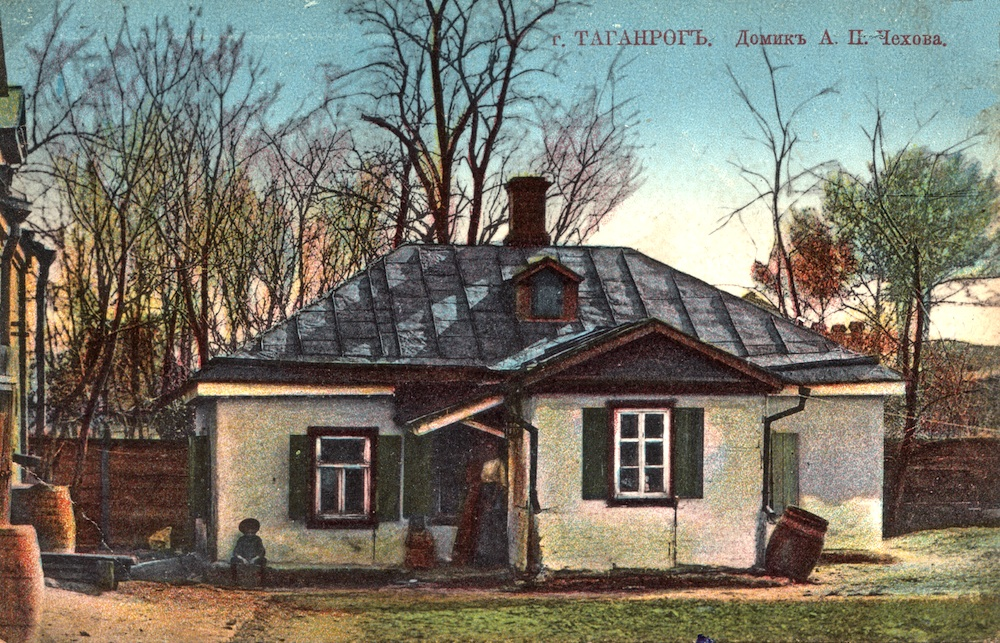
The birthplace of Anton Chekhov on an old postcard, 1910

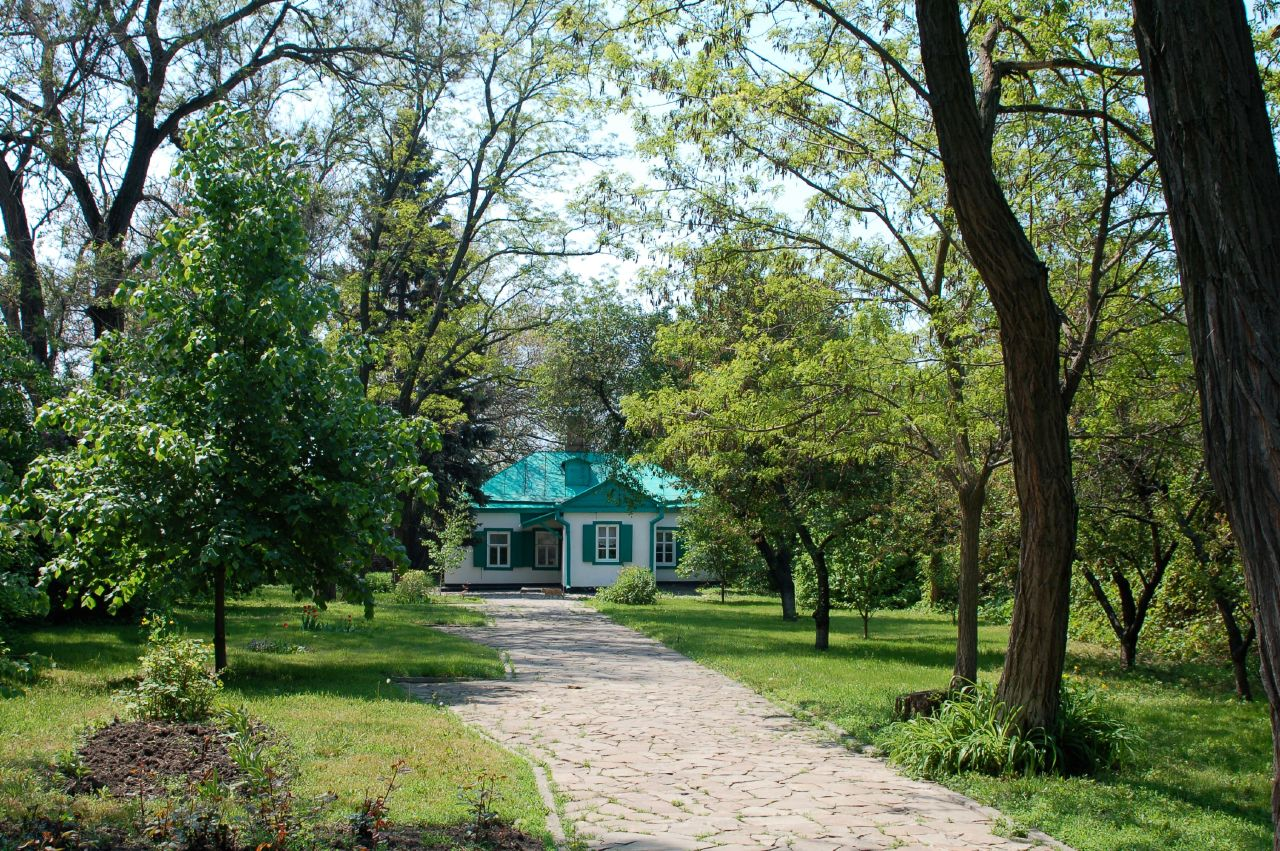
The memorial museum "Birthplace of Anton Chekhov" in May 2006.

== See also ==
- Anton Chekhov's White Dacha in Yalta
