= Ivan Vasilenko =

Soviet writer (1895–1966)

Ivan Dmitrievich Vasilenko
- Born: Ivan Dmitrievich Vasilenko; 20 January 1895; Makiivka, Don Host Oblast, Russian Empire
- Died: 26 May 1966 (aged 71); Taganrog, Russian SFSR, USSR
- Occupation: author of children's books

Ivan Dmitrievich Vasilenko (Russian: Ива́н Дми́триевич Василе́нко, Ukrainian: Іван Дмитрович Василенко; January 20, 1895 – May 26, 1966), was a Soviet writer of children's books.

== Early years ==
Ivan Dmitrievich Vasilenko was born January 20, 1895, in the village of Makiivka, in Don Host Oblast (in present-day Donetsk Oblast, Ukraine) in the family of a volost scribe (deputy volost elser). Seven years later, his family moved to the city of Taganrog. In 1912 Ivan Vasilenko graduated from the 4-year college and became teacher at a village school. He entered the Belgorod pedagogical institute, but was soon dismissed for organization of a Marxist group, and because of that the further route for Vasilenko to teaching was closed and he worked as an accountant in the Taganrog Land bank. After October Revolution, he held a position in a trade union, later worked in public education. He began hi writing career at the age of 39 while bedridden due to severe tuberculosis. During World War II, he contributed to Soviet military newspapers.

== The literary career of Ivan Vasilenko ==
The literary talent of Vasilenko was discovered by Russian writer Vikenty Veresaev in 1937. All of his tales and stories written for 30 years of creative life, such as Magic Box, Childhood of the Actor, The Little Mouse, The Gordian Knot, Cocks, Green Trunk, Golden Shoes, Sunrise is only Once a Day, Merimes Watch, Family Council, Misha and Masha and others, were reissued by local, republican and central publishing houses and used large popularity both for children and for adults.

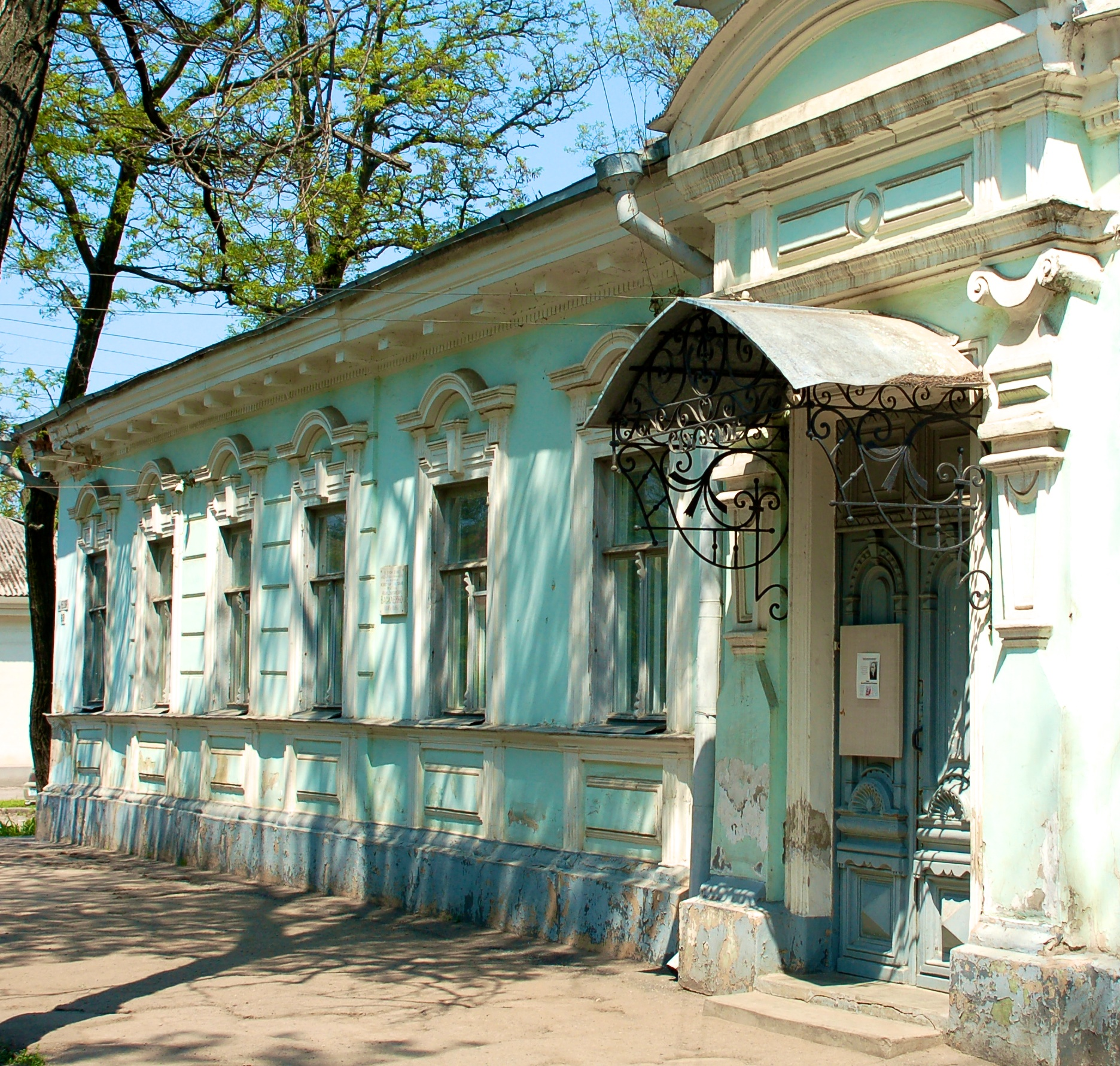
Ivan Vasilenko memorial house and museum in downtown Taganrog.

In 1949, Vasilenko was awarded a State Stalin Prize for the story "The Little Star" about life of trade school's students. Many books have been translated into 27 languages of USSR nations, and into Czech, German, Polish, Bulgarian, Romanian, Vietnamese, French and English languages. His novels The Little Star, Artyomka in the Circus, Magic Box, Little Golden Shoes were released as motion pictures.

He died in Taganrog on May 26, 1966.

== Awards and remembrance ==
- 1950: State Stalin Prize of 3rd degree for the 1948 novel Little Star
- 1950: Order of the Badge of Honour
- Memorial museum was inaugurated in the house on Ulitsa Chekhova 88 in Taganrog, where Ivan Vasilenko and his family lived from 1923 until 1966.
- One of Taganrog Public Chekhov Library's branches is named after Vasilenko.
- In May 2010 a monument "Artyomka" was inaugurated in front of the memorial museum on Chekhov Street.

== Works ==
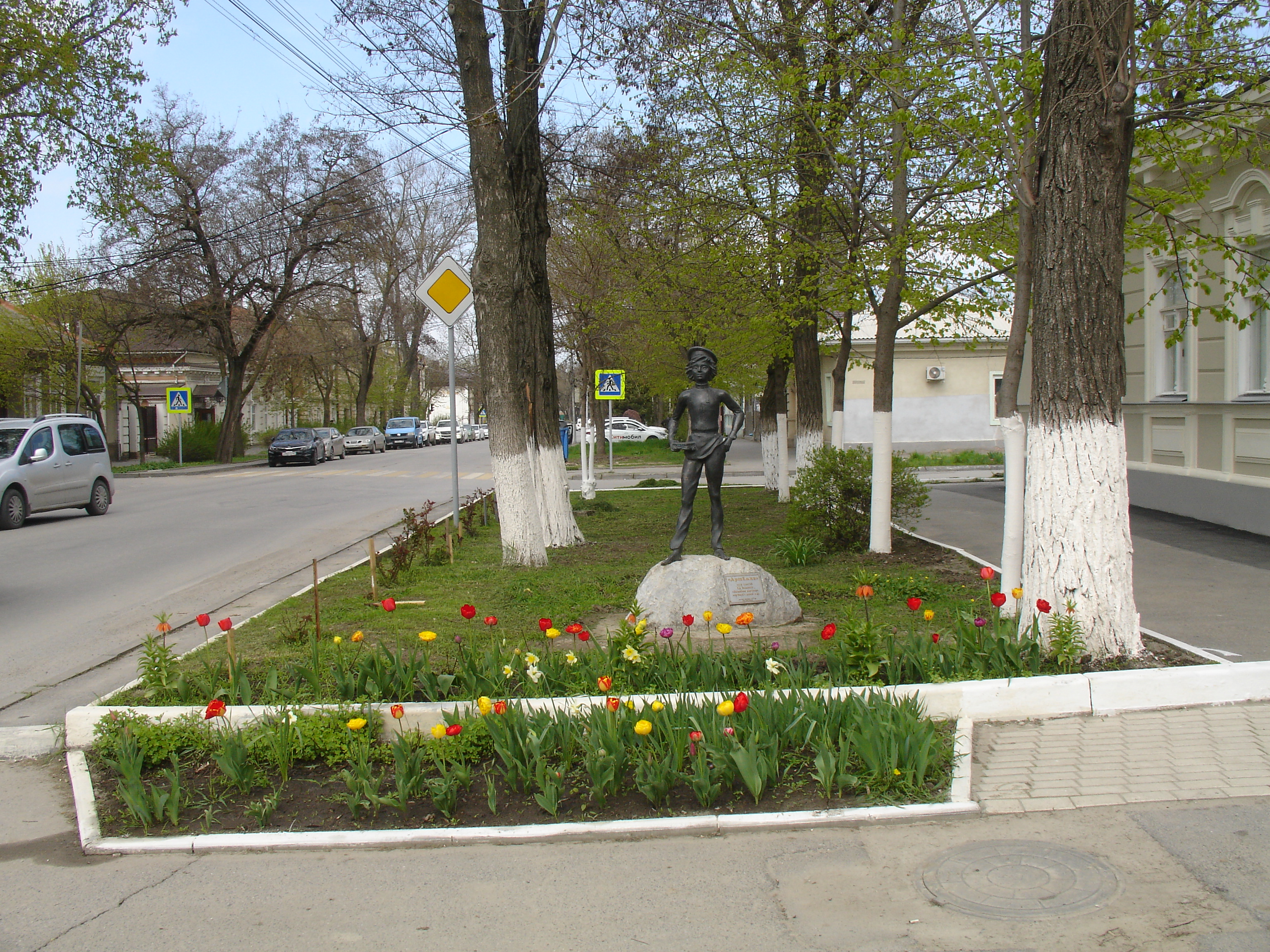
"Artyomka" – a monument to Vasilenko's most popular character in Taganrog.

During the life of Vasileko were printed 130 times, in 27 languages of the Soviet Union, as well as into German, Czech, Polish and Romanian.

- A series of novels about a boy Artyomka:
  - Magic Box («Ростиздат», Ростов, 1938)
  - Actor's Childhood - Artyomka in the Circus
  - Artryomka Visiting Gymnasists
  - Encnanted Play
  - Little Golden Shoes
- Little Star («Молодая гвардия», М., 1948).
  - The 1952 film The Encounter of a Lifetime was based on the novel
- Amazing Stories («Ростиздат», Ростов, 1946).
- My friends (novels and stories) («Сов. писатель», М., 1946).
- Captain's Order («Детизд», М., 1953).
- Selected Stories («Сов. писатель», М., 1956).
- The Life and Adventures of Starveling (1959)
- Selected Stories of Children («Детизд», М., 1960).
- Novels (Душанбе, 1966)
