= Vespa Rally =

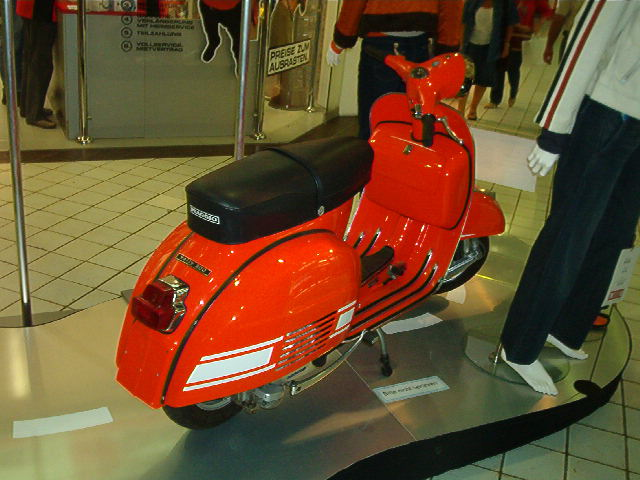
- Vespa Rally 200
- Manufacturer: Piaggio (Vespa)
- Production: 1969–1979
- Assembly: Pontedera, Italy
- Class: Scooter

The Vespa Rally was a scooter produced by Piaggio under the Vespa brand from 1968. The Vespa 180 Rally replaced replaced the Vespa 180 Super Sport.

== History ==
The Vespa 180 Rally was presented in 1968 at EICMA as the replacement of the 180 Super Sport. Production continued until 1973.

In 1972 the largest engined vespa (at that time) the Rally 200, was introduced with production until 1979.

== Specifications ==
	Rally 180	Rally 200
Years in Production	1968-1973	1972-79
Chassis Number Prefix	V5D1T	VSE1T
Engine Type	Air-cooled, single-cylinder, two-stroke engine	Air-cooled, single-cylinder, two-stroke engine
Engine Capacity	180.7cc	197.97cc
Bore x Stroke (mm)	63.5 x 57mm	65.5 x 57mm
Power in kW (BHP)	10.4 hp @ 5700rpm	12.5 hp @ 5700rpm
Transmission	4 Speed, Grip Shift	
Top Speed	105 km/h	97 km/h
Price	157,000 lira	187,000 lira
Production	26,495	41,275
Colours	Yellow, Orange	Metallic Grey, Orange, Red
Weight	102 kg	106 kg
Fuel tank capacity	8.2 litres	8.5 litres
