= Vespa Sprint (2015-) =

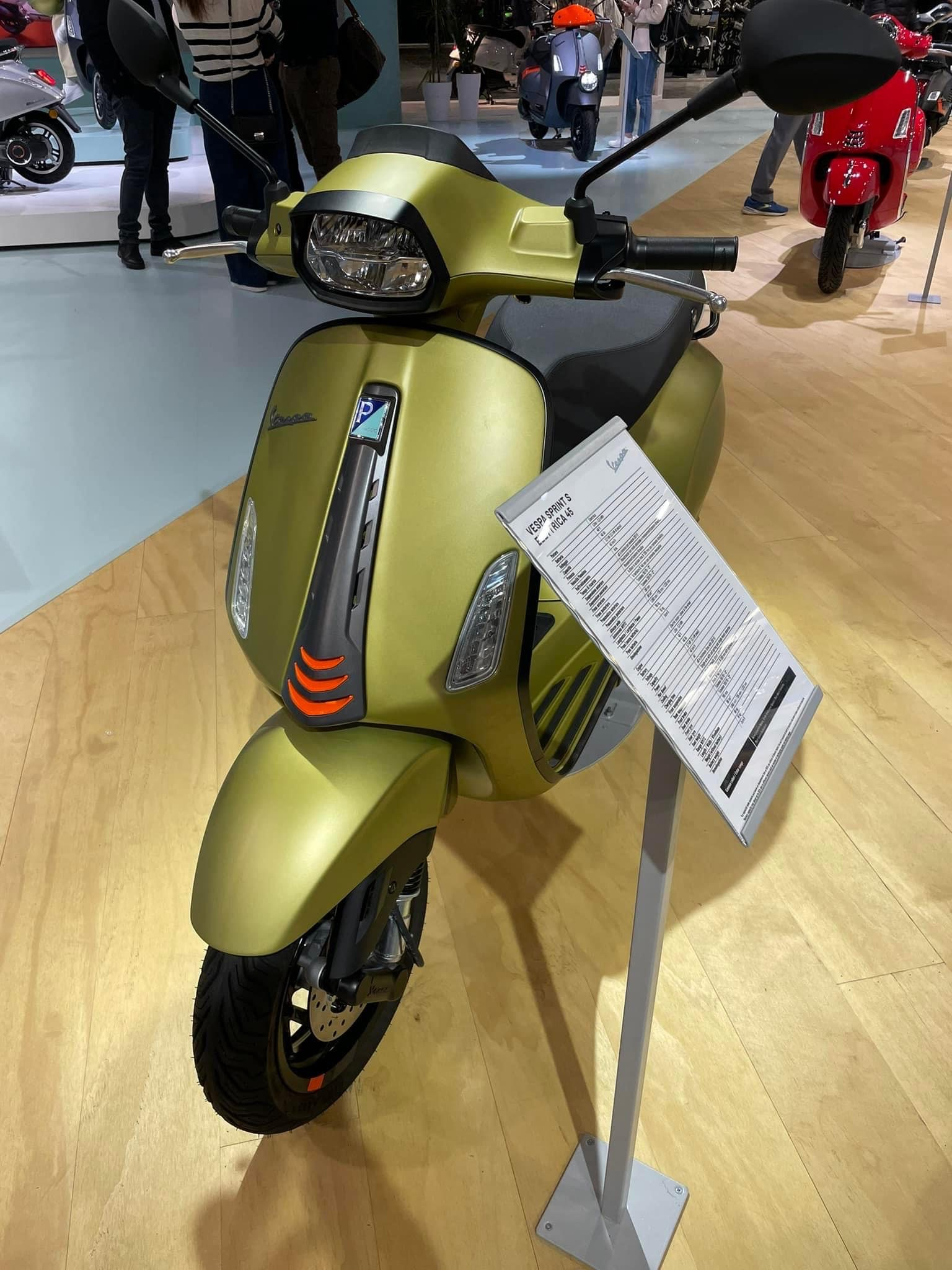
- Manufacturer: Piaggio (Vespa)
- Production: 2015–present
- Assembly: Pontedera, Italy
- Class: Scooter

The Vespa Sprint is a scooter produced by Piaggio under the Vespa brand since 2015. The Vespa Sprint was derived as a sportier evolution from the Vespa Primavera Both replaced the Vespa LX and S.

== History ==
The Vespa Sprint and Sprint S were presented in May 2014 at EICMA and are the replacement of the Vespa S. For the Asian market, the Sprint is produced in the Vin Puch (Hanoi) plant in Vietnam. The name Sprint pays homage to the homonymous model presented at the Milan motorcycle show in 1965 and produced until 1974 though Its square-cut Headlight is a clear reference to the Vespa 50 special of the 1970s. The Vespa Sprint S was introduced a year later with The second series of the Vespa Sprint was introduced in May 2018 at EICMA with Euro 4 anti-pollution i-Get technology.

The second series of the Vespa Sprint was introduced in May 2018 at EICMA with Euro 4 anti-pollution i-Get technology.

== Specifications ==
The Sprint was derived from the earlier Primavera which had maintained the overall dimensions similar to the previous LX though the sprint adopted new 12 inch wheels.

Aesthetically, the Sprint was designed by the Piaggio style center led by Marco Lambri, taking up both elements from the historic Sprint of 1965.

== Variants ==
=== JUSTIN BIEBER X VESPA ===
Introduced in 2022 as a collaboration between world famous musician Justin Bieber and Vespa. This limited-edition model is finished in a unique monochromatic livery, created in collaboration with the global pop icon. It also features white flames on the rear bodywork, with Justin Bieber's name layered over the top.Furthermore, it gets a white matching saddle, white handlebar grips, a rear luggage rack, and five-spoke alloy wheels.

=== Sprint Adventure ===
Vespa Australia have announced the release of the Vespa Sprint Adventure, a custom Vespa Sprint 150cc ABS equipped to tour with black matte details and travel accessories, including front and rear folding racks and a smoked fly screen as standard features.

The Vespa Sprint Adventure has 38 units, though two very unique colours: Jungle inspired Matt Green and Desert inspired Matt Sand

=== Notte ===
released as a single model 150 release, the notte (or night) was characterized by total black graphics. The "night-time" style pairs the beautiful new opaque black of the chassis with numerous glossy black details, including the mirrors, the ornaments of the classic "tie" on the front shield, the handlebar ends, the passenger handle. Refined details include a saddle dedicated to each model and a plate with the logo placed on the rear shield. The rims and muffler guard are also glossy black.

=== Racing Sixties ===
Introduced in 2019 this series's lvery was inspired by the 1960s which were a legendary period in the history of racing and motoring. In addition to the new colour scheme, a brand-new seat and matte black details, matte black finish of the passenger grab handle and footrests, the front and rear light setting, the silencer cover, the rear-view mirrors, the onboard instrument cluster base and shield trim, as well as the crest on the front mudguard .

== Vespa Sprint ==	Sprint 50 2t	Sprint 50 S 2t	Sprint 50	Sprint 125	Sprint 125 S	Sprint 150	Sprint 150 S	Sprint 50 2nd Series	Sprint 50 Sport	Sprint 50 Notte	Sprint 50 Racing Sixties	Sprint 50 Justin Bieber	Sprint 125 2nd Series	Sprint 125 Sport	Sprint 125 Notte	Sprint 125 Racing Sixties	Sprint 125 Justin Bieber	Sprint 150 2nd Series	Sprint 150 Racing Sixties	Sprint 150 Justin Bieber
Years in Production	2014-2018	2015-2018	2015-2018	2015-2018	2015-2018	2015-2018	2015-2018	2019-	2019-	2019-2021	2020-2022	2022-	2019-	2019-	2019-2021	2019-2021	2022-	2019-	2019-2021	2022-
Chassis Number Prefix																				
Engine Type	Air-cooled, single-cylinder, two-stroke engine	Air-cooled, single-cylinder, two-stroke engine	Air-cooled, single-cylinder, four-stroke engine	Air-cooled, single-cylinder, four-stroke engine	Air-cooled, single-cylinder, four-stroke engine	Air-cooled, single-cylinder, four-stroke engine	Air-cooled, single-cylinder, four-stroke engine	Air-cooled, single-cylinder, four-stroke engine	Air-cooled, single-cylinder, four-stroke engine	Air-cooled, single-cylinder, four-stroke engine	Air-cooled, single-cylinder, four-stroke engine	Air-cooled, single-cylinder, four-stroke engine	Air-cooled, single-cylinder, four-stroke engine	Air-cooled, single-cylinder, four-stroke engine	Air-cooled, single-cylinder, four-stroke engine	Air-cooled, single-cylinder, four-stroke engine	Air-cooled, single-cylinder, four-stroke engine	Air-cooled, single-cylinder, four-stroke engine	Air-cooled, single-cylinder, four-stroke engine	Air-cooled, single-cylinder, four-stroke engine
Engine Capacity	49cc	49cc	49.9cc	124.5cc	124.5cc	154.8cc	154.8cc	49.9cc	49.9cc	49.9cc	49.9cc	49.9cc	124.5cc	124.5cc	124.5cc	124.5cc	124.5cc	154.8cc	154.8cc	154.8cc
Bore x Stroke (mm)	40 x 39.3mm	40 x 39.3mm	39 x 41.8mm	52 x 58.6mm	52 x 58.6mm	58 x 58.6mm	58 x 58.6mm	40 x 39.3mm	40 x 39.3mm	40 x 39.3mm	40 x 39.3mm	40 x 39.3mm	52 x 58.6mm	52 x 58.6mm	52 x 58.6mm	52 x 58.6mm	52 x 58.6mm	58 x 58.6mm	58 x 58.6mm	58 x 58.6mm
Power in kW (BHP)	4.4 hp @ 6500rpm	4.4 hp @ 6500rpm	4.4 hp @ 6500rpm	10.7 hp@7700rpm	10.7 hp@7700rpm	12.9 hp@7750rpm	12.9 hp@7750rpm	4.4 hp @ 6500rpm	4.4 hp @ 6500rpm	4.4 hp @ 6500rpm	4.4 hp @ 6500rpm	4.4 hp @ 6500rpm	8 hp @ 7700rpm	8 hp @ 7700rpm	8 hp @ 7700rpm	8 hp @ 7700rpm	8 hp @ 7700rpm	9.5 hp @ 7750rpm	9.5 hp @ 7750rpm	9.5 hp @ 7750rpm
Torque (Nm)				10.4 nm @6000 rpm	10.4 nm @6000 rpm	12.4 nm @6500 rpm	12.4 nm @6500 rpm						10.7 nm @ 6000rpm	10.7 nm @ 6000rpm	10.7 nm @ 6000rpm	10.7 nm @ 6000rpm	10.7 nm @ 6000rpm	12.9 nm @6500 rpm	12.9 nm @6500 rpm	12.9 nm @6500 rpm
Transmission	Continuously variable automatic																			
Top Speed	40 km/h	40 km/h	40 km/h	100 km/h	100 km/h	105 km/h	105 km/h	40 km/h	40 km/h	40 km/h	40 km/h	40 km/h	100 km/h	100 km/h	100 km/h	100 km/h	100 km/h	105 km/h	105 km/h	105 km/h
Price	€2,900	€2,950	€3,000	€4,000	€4,200	€4,100	€4,300	€3,530	€3,580	€3,680	€3,740	€4,600	€4,640	€5,140	€4,790	€4,880	€6,100	€5,340	€5,460	€6,200
Production																				
Colours	Yellow,blue,red,white,black	Titanium Grey	Yellow,blue,red,white,black	Yellow,blue,red,white,black	Titanium Grey	Yellow,blue,red,white,black	Titanium Grey	Yellow,red,white,black	Blue, light grey, dark grey	Matt black	white & red, Green & yellow	White	Yellow,red,black	Blue, light grey, dark grey	Matt black	white & red, Green & yellow	White	Blue, light grey, dark grey	white & red, Green & yellow	White
Weight	98 kg	98 kg	98 kg	106 kg	106 kg	106 kg	106 kg	98 kg	98 kg	98 kg	98 kg	98 kg	106 kg	106 kg	106 kg	106 kg	106 kg	106 kg	106 kg	106 kg
Fuel tank capacity	7 litres	7 litres	7 litres	8 litres	8 litres	8 litres	8 litres	7 litres	7 litres	7 litres	7 litres	7 litres	8 litres	8 litres	8 litres	8 litres	8 litres	8 litres	8 litres	8 litres
