= Vespa 946 =

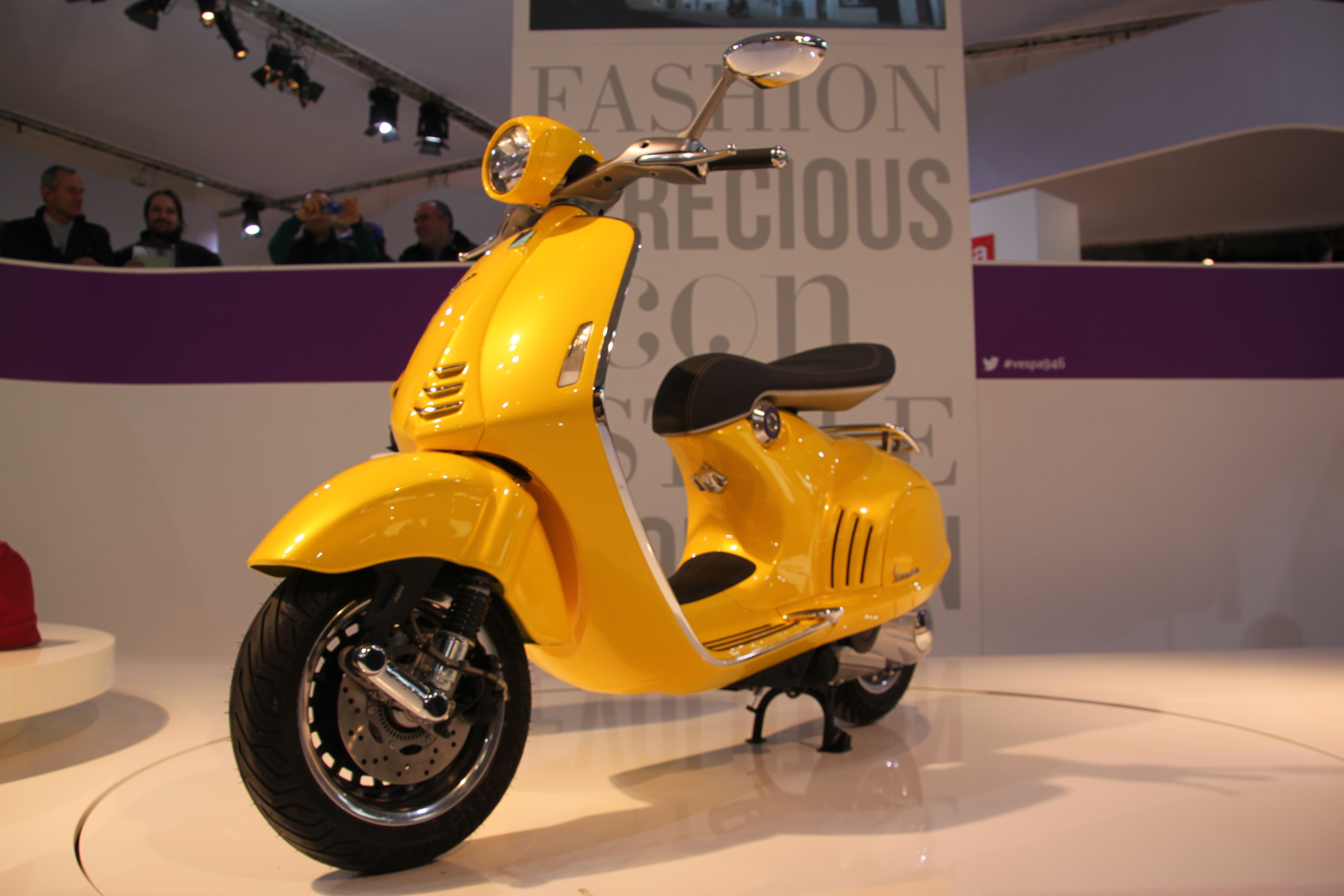
- Manufacturer: Vespa
- Parent company: Piaggio
- Engine: 125 cc (7.6 cu in) and 150 cc (9.2 cu in) air-cooled, three-valve, single
- Power: 11.7 hp (8.7 kW) (125 cc); 13 hp (9.7 kW) (150 cc)

The Vespa 946 is a scooter announced by Piaggio, to be sold under their Vespa brand starting in July 2013. Piaggio presented the retro-futurist Vespa Quarantasei concept, based on the 1945 Vespa MP6 prototype, at the 2011 EICMA motorcycle show. The final production version, renamed the Vespa 946, appeared the following year, at EICMA 2012. The 946 is fitted with Piaggio's air-cooled, three-valve, single-cylinder engine, with an output of 11.7 hp (8.7 kW) for the 125 cc (7.6 cu in) displacement version, and 13 hp (9.7 kW) for the 150 cc (9.2 cu in) version.

== Context and debut ==
The scooter was anticipated by the Vespa Quarantasei concept, presented at EICMA 2011 which in shape recalls the very first Vespa MP6 of 1946, on which Piaggio debuted the new generation of air-cooled three-valve single-shaft four - stroke engines. GET divided into 125 cm^{3} and 150 cm^{3} displacements.

At EICMA 2012 (where it won the "best in show" award) the definitive version called Vespa 946 (which in the name recalls the 1946 debut year of the first Vespa) made its debut, adopting the same mechanical parts as the concept, with the 125 cm^{3} and 150 cm^{3} air-cooled three-valve four-stroke engines and almost entirely reproducing their aesthetics and design.

== Technique and design ==
The 3-valve single-shaft distribution allows optimizing the inlet of the fuel-air mixture and the outlet of the exhaust gases, as well as mounting the spark plug in an optimal position, improving the thermal efficiency in combustion and at the same time ensuring optimal cooling of the parts inside the header. Bearings have been used for all moving parts in order to reduce internal friction. The 3-valve distribution solution compared to the 2-valve one is more effective as it improves intake. The performance figures for the 125 are: maximum power of 8.5 kW at 8250 rpm and maximum torque of 10.7 Nm at 6500 rpm.

The basic frame is made of welded sheet steel, but some parts and elements such as the front mudguard, handlebars, saddle or side panels are made of aluminum alloy. On the rear axle, for the first time, a brand new suspension was used with a single shock absorber with gas spring mounted horizontally with a progressive linkage system. In addition, there is the anti-lock braking system ABS and anti-skid traction control (ASR). The braking system consists of two discs, including a 220 mm front one.

The circular headlight consists of a single LED element. The design of the 946 is based on the historical Vespa models, taking up many elements such as the "low tail" rear part and the "suspended saddle" of the Vespa MP6. The 946's saddle is hinged on a die-cast aluminum support and covered in waterproofed fabric.

Production takes place only through the marketing of limited or special editions built in a predefined number of specimens, which are put up for sale on an annual basis.

Initially the 2013 'Ricordo Italiano' editions in black or white were released in a 3600 unit runfollowed in 2014 by the 'Bellisima' range in Metallic Grey or Midnight Blue.

In June 2015 to celebrate the 40th anniversary of the foundation of Giorgio Armani and the 130th birthday of the Piaggio Group, Emporio Armani designed a special exclusive run of individually numbered Vespa 946's with a subdued colour palette and adorned with Eagle Logo and above the headlight 'Emporio Armani’.

In 2016, the international jury of the XXIV Compasso d'Oro awarded the Vespa 946 with an honorable mention, in the "design for mobility" category.

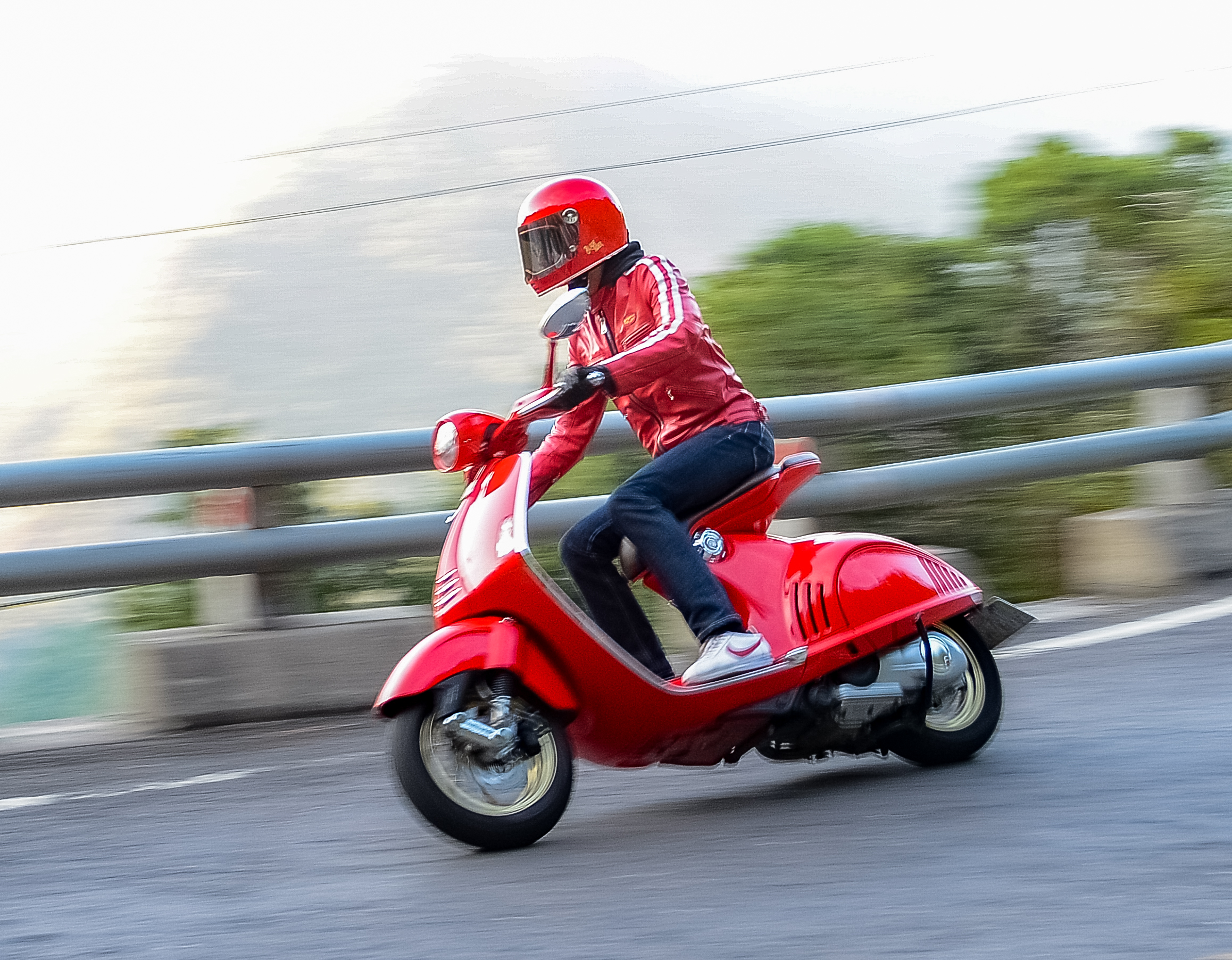
Vespa 946 Red

A collaborative partnership between the Piaggio Group and Product RED in 2019 created the Vespa 946 Red- an all-red version of the classic scooter, sales of which will go towards initiatives fighting AIDS, tuberculosis and malaria.

Introduced in 2021 and sold exclusively in Dior boutiques, the Vespa 946 Christian Dior Scooter was a collaboration with the fashion house and Vespa. The model was designed by Maria Grazia Chiuri, Creative Director of Dior women’s collections and sported exclusive saddle, a top case patterned with the Dior oblique motif (designed by Marc Bohan in 1967) and A helmet adorned with the same iconic motif.

in 2023, a limited 1000 unit run was introduced titled 946 10 Anniversario Bunny, and was launched to commemorate the Year of the Rabbit in the lunar calendar and to celebrate 10 years of production of the 946 .

In 2024, a limited edition of 1888 units exclusively in golden hue finish and emblazoned with a vibrant emerald green dragon motif that snakes around the livery, titled 946 Dragon, was launched to commemorate the Year of the Dragon in the lunar calendar.

In 2025, a limited edition of 888 units exclusively in Azzurro silver colour, titled 946 Snake, was launched to commemorate the Year of the Snake in the lunar calendar.

Announced January 2026 beginning delivery in May 2026, a limited edition exclusively in bay colour, (deep brown) titled 946 Horse, was launched to commemorate the Year of the Horse in the lunar calendar
