= Vespa 150 TAP =

Anti-tank scooter

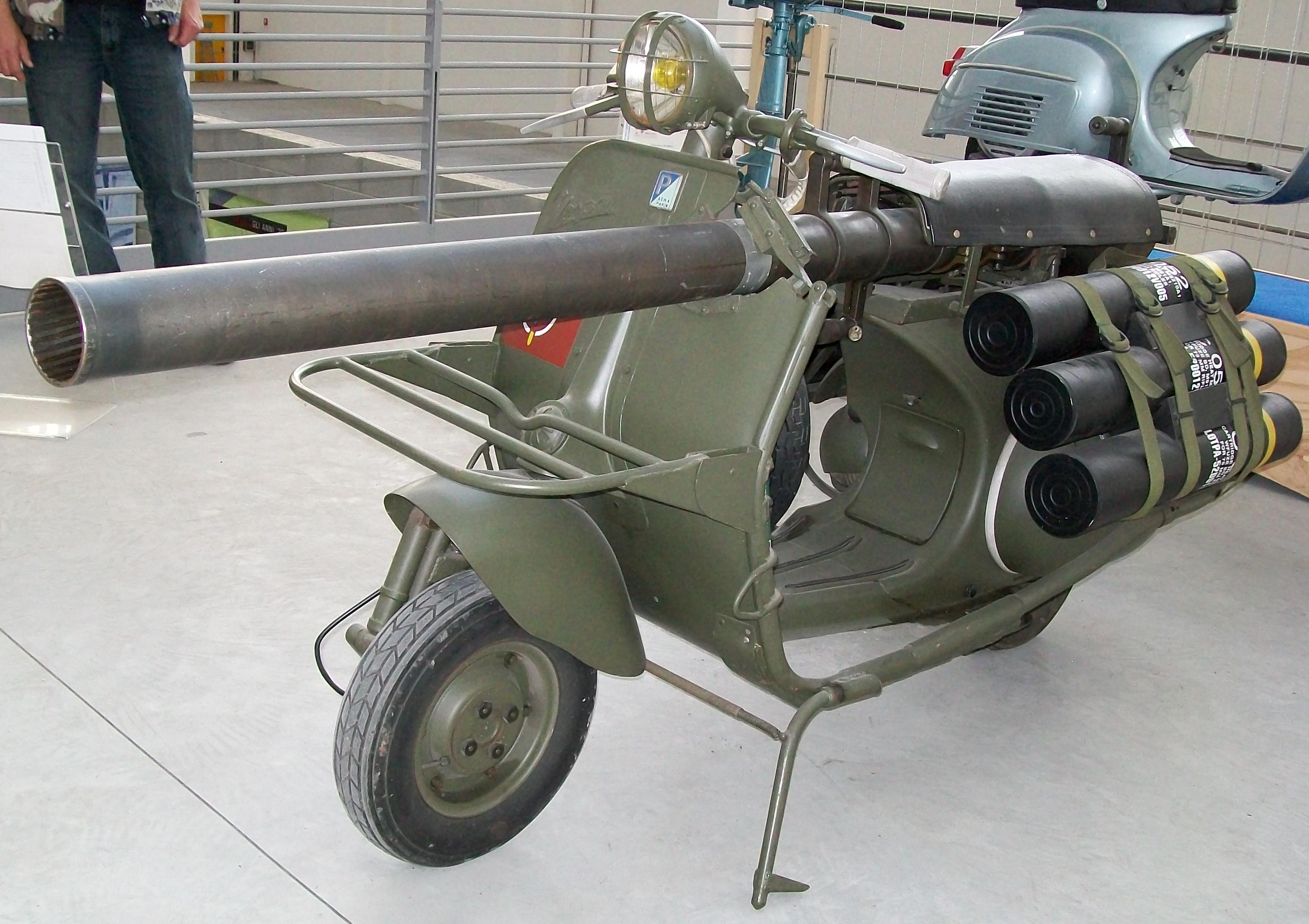
- Manufacturer: Ateliers de Construction de Motocycles et Automobiles (ACMA)
- Also called: TAP 56, TAP 59
- Parent company: Piaggio
- Production: 1956–1959
- Assembly: Fourchambault, France
- Predecessor: Cushman military scooter
- Class: scooter
- Engine: 145.2 cc single-cylinder two-stroke engine
- Bore / stroke: 58.5 mm x 54 mm
- Top speed: 66 km/h (41 mph)
- Brakes: drum
- Weight: 115 kg (254 lb) (wet)
- Range: 200 km (120 mi)

The Vespa 150 TAP was an anti-tank scooter made in the 1950s from a Vespa scooter for use with French paratroops (troupes aéroportées, TAP). Introduced in 1956 and updated in 1959, the scooter was produced by Ateliers de Construction de Motocycles et Automobiles (ACMA), the licensed assembler of Vespas in France at the time. Modifications from the civilian Vespa included a reinforced frame and a 75 mm (3.0 in) recoilless rifle mounted to the scooter.

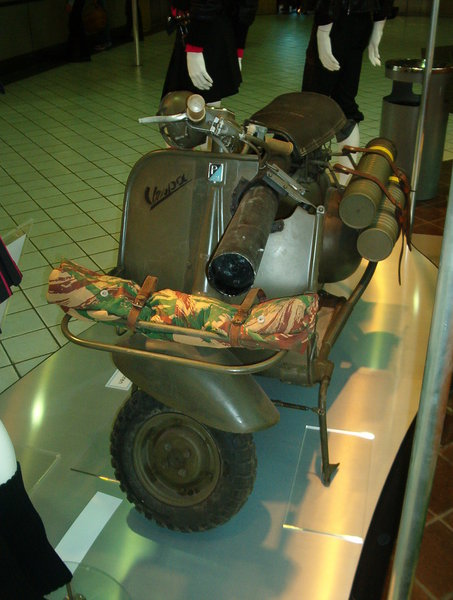
Vespa 150 TAP

The 150 TAPs mounted a M20 75 mm recoilless rifle, a U.S.-made light anti-armour weapon. It was very light in comparison to a standard 75 mm (3.0 in) cannon but was still able to penetrate 100 mm (3.9 in) of armour with its HEAT warhead. The recoil was counteracted by venting propellant gases out the rear of the weapon which eliminated the need for a mechanical recoil system or heavy mount.

The scooters would be parachute-dropped in pairs, accompanied by a two-man team. The gun was carried on one scooter, while the ammunition was loaded on the other. Due to the lack of any kind of aiming devices the recoilless rifle was never designed to be fired from the scooter; the gun was mounted on a M1917 Browning machine gun tripod, which was also carried by the scooter, before being fired. It could not be fired while the scooter was moving.

The "Bazooka Vespa" was relatively cheap: Vespas cost roughly US$500 at the time, and the M20s were plentiful. 600 of them were produced, between 1956 and 1959. It came with a small trolley, two fuel jerrycans and six rounds of ammunition.
