= Vespa ET =

Range of motorcycle scooters by Piaggio

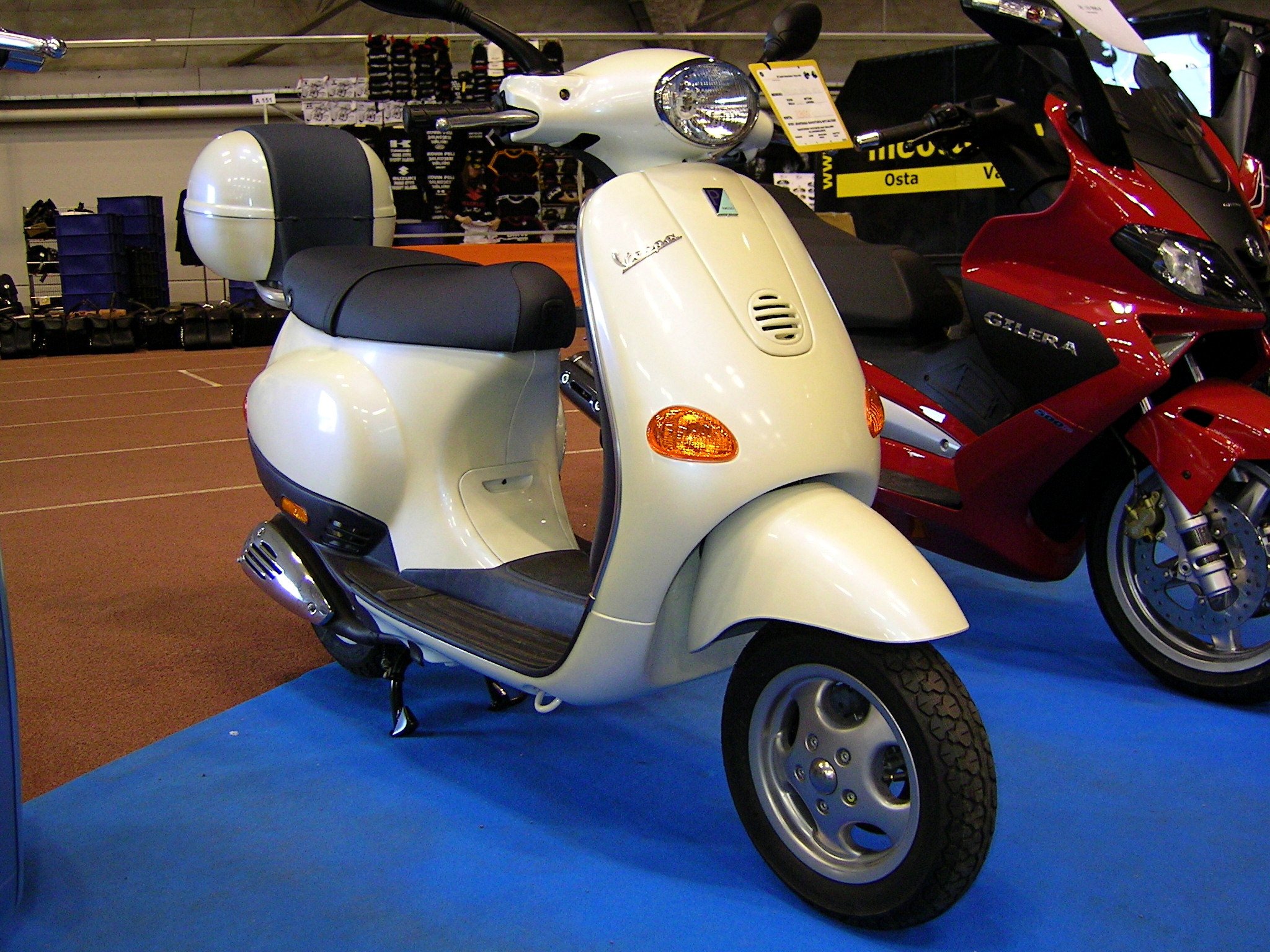
Vespa ET4 50 2004

The Vespa ET 2 and ET 4 (ET 8 in Asia) is a range of scooters manufactured by Piaggio under the Vespa brand. The launch of the ET line heralded the start of what enthusiast consider the modern age of the brand, the first to offer a 4-stroke engine and reintroduced Vespa scooters to the United States after pulling out of the market in the early 1980s.

== History ==
The Vespa ET was first presented in 1996 in Cologne to coincide with the 50th Anniversary of the brand. Two engines where offered on launch: a 50cc two-stroke model and a 125cc with a 4-stroke engine which had previously been utilised by Piaggio in their Sfera scooter. The Vespa was built with a rear drum brake and front disc brake, a single-cylinder air cooled engine (aluminum head). It was distributed as Vespa ET2 50cc and as Vespa Et4 125cc in 1999 at the milan show a second series of 125cc was presented. Additionally a 150cc version which allowed access to highways in Italy was introduced.

	ET2 50cc Carburetor	ET2 50cc FAST Injection	ET4 50cc	ET4 125cc	ET4 150	ET4 125 2nd series	ET4 150 2nd series
Years in Production	1997-2005	1997-2005	1996-2004	1996-2000	1999-2000	2000-2005	2000-2005
Chassis Number Prefix	ZAPC 16–00001	ZAPC 16–00001	ZAPC 384–00001	ZAPM1900-0001	ZAPM1900-0001	ZAPM1900	ZAPM1900
Engine Type	Air-cooled, single-cylinder, two-stroke engine	Air-cooled, single-cylinder, two-stroke engine	Air-cooled, single-cylinder, Four-stroke Hiper4 engine	Air-cooled, single-cylinder, Four-stroke engine	Air-cooled, single-cylinder, Four-stroke LEADER engine	Air-cooled, single-cylinder, Four-stroke LEADER engine	Air-cooled, single-cylinder, Four-stroke LEADER engine
Engine Capacity	49.3cc	49.3cc	49.9cc	124.2cc	149.5cc	124.2cc	151cc
Bore x Stroke (mm)	40 x 39.3mm	40 x 39.3mm	39 x 41.8mm	57 x 48.6mm	62.6x 48.6mm	57 x 48.6mm	62.6x 48.6mm
Power in kW (BHP)	5.75 kW 4.5 hp @ 6500rpm	5.75 kW 4.5 hp @ 6500rpm		12hp@7750rpm	12.5hp/7500rpm	12hp@7750rpm	12.5hp/7500rpm
Torque (Nm)	0.5kgm/6250rpm	0.5kgm/6250rpm		1kgm/6500rpm	1.3kgm/6000rpm	1kgm/6500rpm	1.3kgm/6000rpm
Transmission	Continuously variable automatic						
Top Speed	45 km/h	45 km/h	40 km/h	97 km/h	97 km/h	95 km/h	97 km/h
Price	€2,150	€2,300	€2,200	€3,050	€3,150	€3,080	€3,180
Production	170,000	39,300	42,700	83,000	32,000	80,300	30,600
Colours	Red,blue,grey,black,yellow	Red,blue,grey,black,yellow	orange, green,blue,red,grey,white,black,	orange, green,blue,red,grey,white,black,pale green	silver,red,white,blue,green,black,purple	orange, green,blue,red,grey,white,black,pale green	silver,red,white,blue,green,black,purple
Weight	92kg	92kg	96kg	102kg	105kg	102kg	105kg
Fuel tank capacity	9 litres						
