= Vespa =

Italian scooter

- Type: Subsidiary
- Industry: Scooter
- Founded: 23 April 1946; 80 years ago in Florence, Tuscany
- Founder: Enrico Piaggio
- Headquarters: Pontedera, Tuscany, Italy
- Parent: Piaggio
- Website: vespa.com

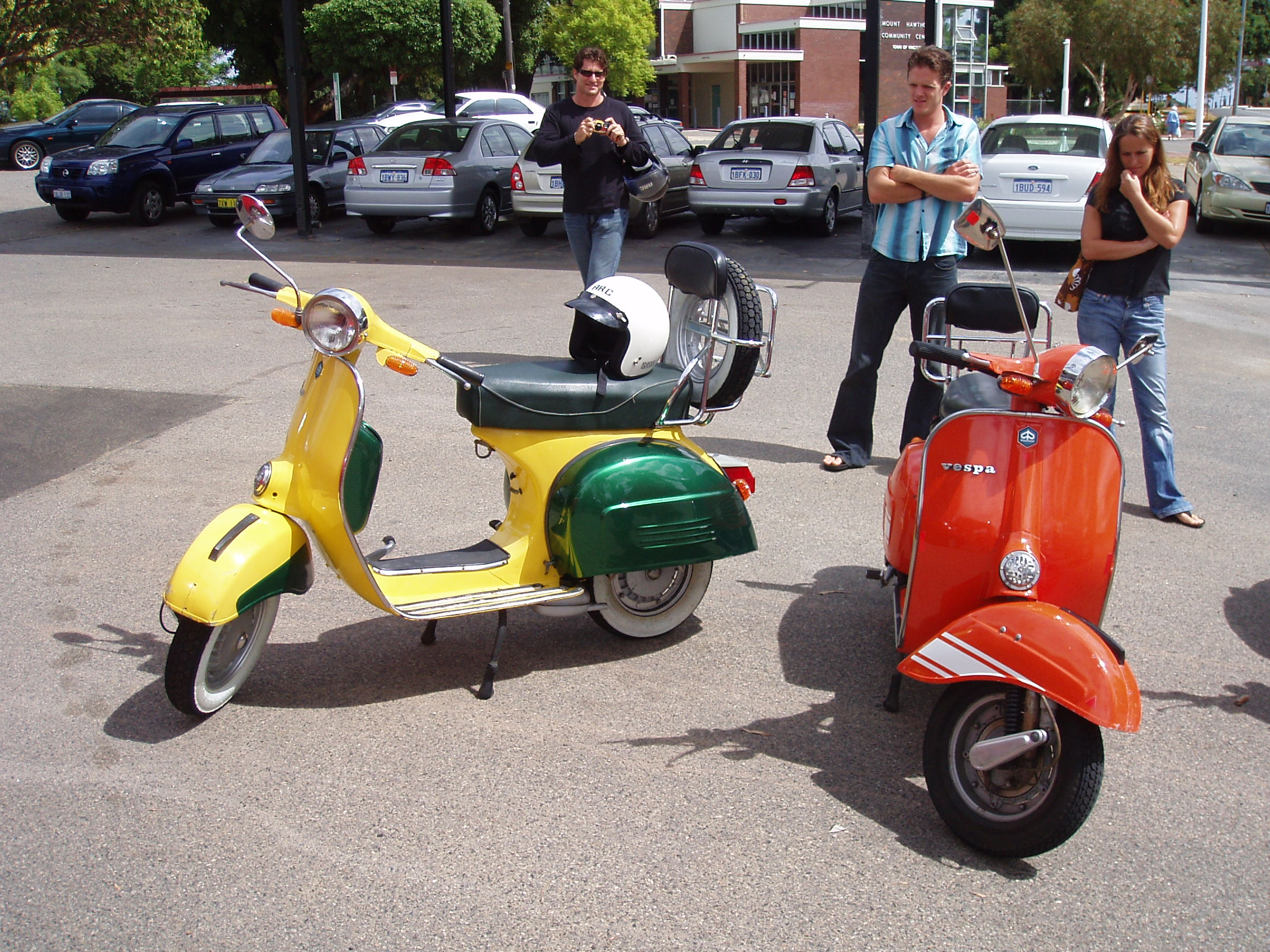
Classic Vespas in Perth, Western Australia

Classic Vespa sound (43 seconds)

Vespa (Italian pronunciation: [ˈvɛspa]; Italian for 'wasp') is an Italian brand of scooters and mopeds manufactured by Piaggio. The Vespa has evolved from a single model motor scooter manufactured in 1946 by Piaggio & Co. S.p.A. of Pontedera, Italy, to a full line of scooters and one of seven companies today owned by Piaggio.

From their inception, Vespa scooters have been known for a painted, pressed steel body which combines, in a unified structure: a full cowling enclosure around the engine concealing dirt or grease, a flat floor panel protecting the feet, and a prominent front fairing to divert wind and rain.

== History ==
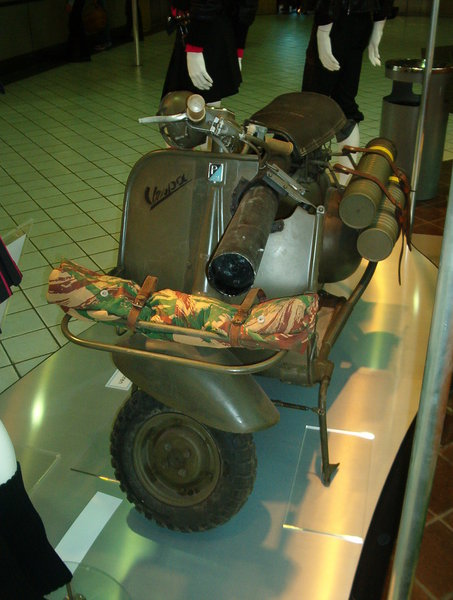
Vespa 150 TAP, modified for the French paratroopers that carried (not fired) an antitank weapon.

After World War II, in light of its agreement to cease war activities with the Allies, Italy had its aircraft industry severely restricted in both capability and capacity.

Piaggio emerged from the conflict with its Pontedera bomber plane plant demolished by bombing. Italy's crippled economy, and the disastrous state of its roads, were not immediately conducive to the redevelopment of the automobile market. Enrico Piaggio, the son of Piaggio's founder Rinaldo Piaggio, decided to leave the aeronautical field to address Italy's urgent need for a modern and affordable mode of transportation for the masses.

In 2024 Piaggio celebrated 140 years with limited edition of 'Vespa 140th of Piaggio,' with only 140 units available from 18 to 21 April 2024.

=== Design ===
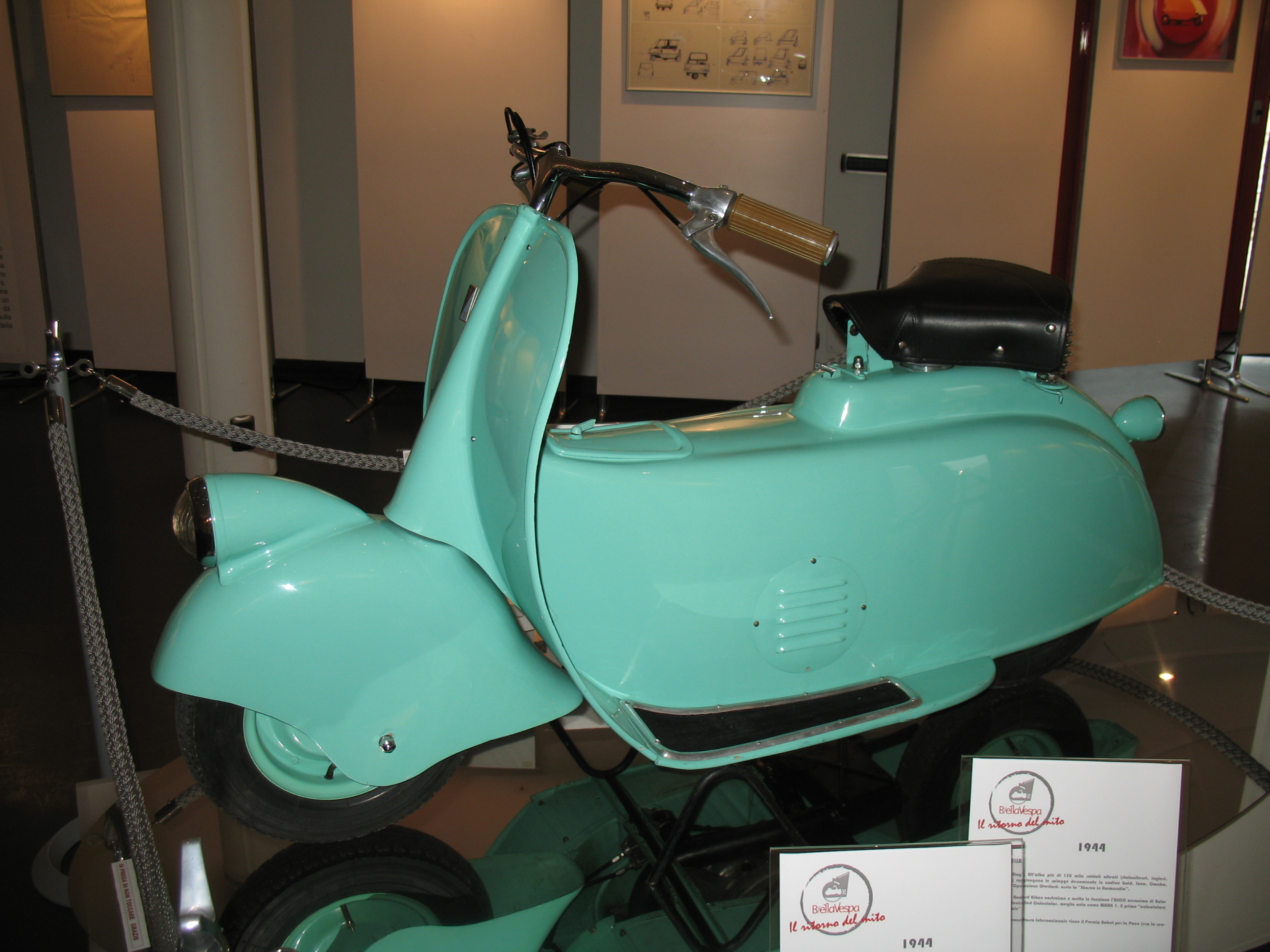
Piaggio MP5 "Paperino", the initial Piaggio prototype

In 1944 Piaggio engineers Renzo Spolti and Vittorio Casini designed a motorcycle with bodywork fully enclosing the drivetrain and forming a tall splash guard at the front. In addition to the bodywork, the design included handlebar-mounted controls, forced air cooling, wheels of small diameter, and a tall central section that had to be straddled. Officially known as the MP5 ("Moto Piaggio no. 5"), the prototype was nicknamed "Paperino" (meaning "Donald Duck" in Italian). Piaggio was displeased with the MP5, especially the tall central section. He contracted aeronautical engineer Corradino D'Ascanio, to redesign the scooter. D'Ascanio, who had earlier been consulted by Ferdinando Innocenti about scooter design and manufacture, made it immediately known that he hated motorcycles, believing them to be bulky, dirty, and unreliable.

D'Ascanio's MP6 prototype had its engine mounted beside the rear wheel. The wheel was driven directly from the transmission, eliminating the drive chain and the oil and dirt associated with it. The prototype had a unit spar frame with stress-bearing steel outer panels. These changes allowed the MP6 to have a step-through design instead of a tall centre section like that of the MP5 Paperino. The MP6 design also included a single-sided front suspension, interchangeable front and rear wheels mounted on stub axles, and a spare wheel. Other features of the MP6 were similar to those on the Paperino, including the handlebar-mounted controls and the enclosed bodywork with the tall front splash guard.

Upon seeing the MP6 for the first time, Enrico Piaggio exclaimed: "Sembra una vespa!" ("It looks like a wasp!") Piaggio effectively named his new scooter on the spot. Vespa is both Latin and Italian for wasp—derived from the vehicle's body shape: the thicker rear part connected to the front part by a narrow waist, and the steering rod resembled antennae.

=== Product ===
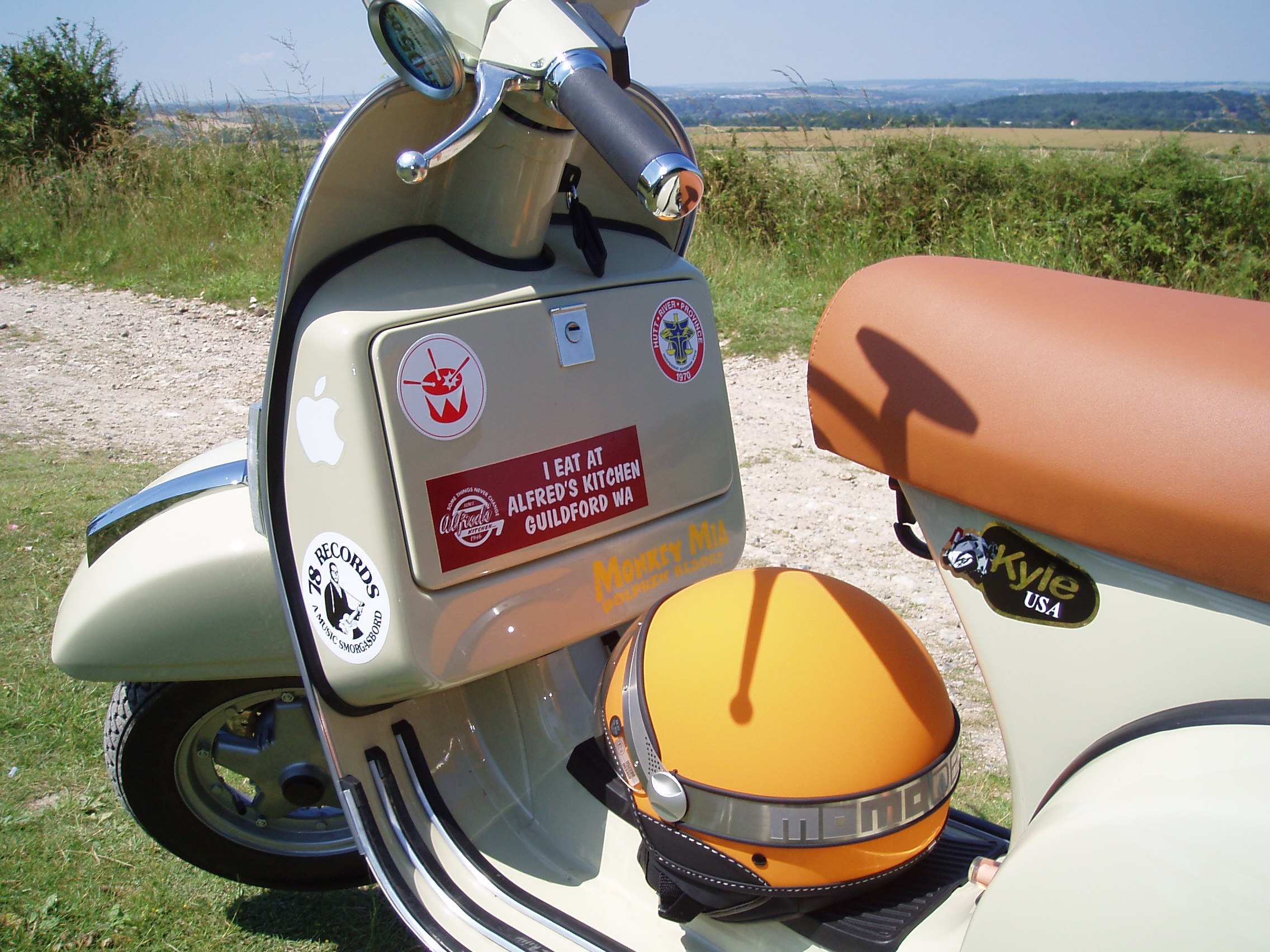
Glove box on newer Vespa PX

On 23 April 1946 at 12 o'clock in the central office for inventions, models and makes of the Ministry of Industry and Commerce in Florence, Piaggio e C. S.p.A. took out a patent for a "motorcycle of a rational complexity of organs and elements combined with a frame with mudguards and a casing covering the whole mechanical part".

The basic patented design allowed a series of features to be deployed on the spar-frame that would later allow quick development of new models. The original Vespa featured a rear pillion seat for a passenger, or optionally a storage compartment. The original front protection "shield" was a flat piece of aero metal; later, this developed into a twin skin to allow additional storage behind the front shield, similar to the glove compartment in a car. The fuel cap was located underneath the (hinged) seat, which saved the cost of an additional lock on the fuel cap or need for additional metal work on the smooth skin.

The scooter had rigid rear suspension and small 8-inch (200 mm) wheels that allowed a compact design and plenty of room for the rider's legs. The Vespa's enclosed, horizontally mounted 98 cc two-stroke engine acted directly on the rear drive wheel through a three-speed transmission. The twistgrip-controlled gear change involved a system of rods. The early engine had no forced-air cooling, but fan blades were soon attached to the magneto-flywheel (which houses the points and generates electricity for accessories and for the engine's spark) to push air over the cylinder's cooling fins. The modern Vespa engine is still cooled this way.

The MP6 prototype had large grilles on the front and rear of the rear fender covering the engine. This was done to allow air in to cool the engine, as the prototype did not have fan cooling. A cooling fan similar to that used on the MP5 "Paperino" prototype was included in the design of the production Vespa, and the grilles were removed from the fender.

== Launch ==
Piaggio filed a patent for the Vespa scooter design in April 1946. The application documents referred to a "model of a practical nature" for a "motorcycle with rationally placed parts and elements with a frame combining with mudguards and engine-cowling covering all working parts", of which "the whole constitutes a rational, comfortable motorcycle offering protection from mud and dust without jeopardizing requirements of appearance and elegance". The patent was approved the following December.

The first 13 examples appeared in spring 1946, and revealed their aeronautical background. In the first examples, one can recognize the typical aircraft technology. Attention to aerodynamics is evident in all the design, in particular on the tail. It was also one of the first vehicles to use monocoque construction (where the body is an integral part of the chassis).

The company was aiming to manufacture the new Vespa in large numbers, and their longstanding industrial experience led to an efficient Ford-style volume production line. The scooter was presented to the press at Rome Golf Club, where journalists were apparently mystified by the strange, pastel coloured, toy-like object on display. However, the road tests were encouraging, and even with no rear suspension the machine was more manoeuvrable and comfortable to ride than a traditional motorcycle.

Following its public debut at the 1946 Milan Fair, the first fifty sold slowly. With the introduction of payment by installments, sales took off.

== Sales and development ==
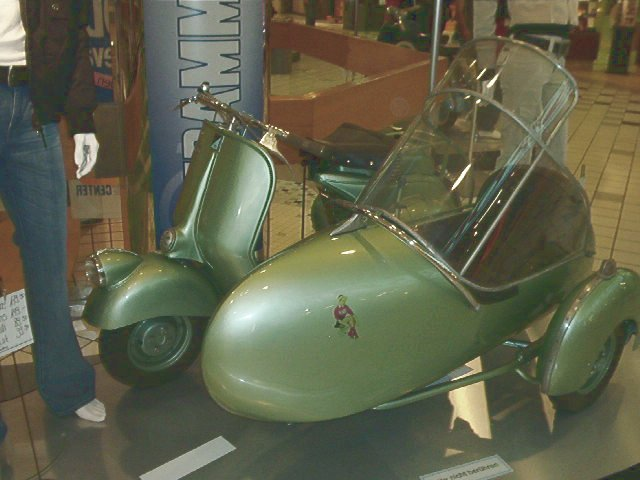
Original Vespa with attached sidecar

Piaggio sold some 2,500 Vespas in 1947, over 10,000 in 1948, 20,000 in 1949, and over 60,000 in 1950.

The biggest sales promotion ever came courtesy of Hollywood. In 1952, Audrey Hepburn side-saddled Gregory Peck's Vespa in the feature film Roman Holiday for a ride through Rome, resulting in over 100,000 sales. In 1956, John Wayne dismounted from his horse in favor of the two-wheeler to get between takes on sets, and Marlon Brando, Dean Martin, and the entertainer Abbe Lane had become Vespa owners. William Wyler filmed Ben Hur in Rome in 1959, allowing Charlton Heston to abandon horse and chariot between takes to take a spin on the Vespa.

Vespa clubs popped up throughout Europe, and by 1952, worldwide Vespa Club membership had surpassed 50,000. By the mid-1950s, Vespas were being manufactured under licence in Germany, the United Kingdom, France, Belgium and Spain; in the 1960s, production was started in India, Brazil and Indonesia. By 1956, one million had been sold, then two million by 1960. By the 1960s, the Vespa—originally conceived as a utility vehicle—had come to symbolize freedom and imagination, and resulted in further sales boosts: four million by 1970, and ten million by the late 1980s.

Improvements were made to the original design and new models were introduced. The 1948 Vespa 125 had rear suspension and a bigger engine. The headlamp was moved up to the handlebars in 1953 and had more engine power and a restyled rear fairing. A cheaper spartan version was also available. One of the best-loved models was the Vespa 150 GS introduced in 1955 with a 150 cc engine, a long saddle, and the faired handlebar-headlamp unit. Then came the 50 cc of 1963, and in 1968 Vespa 125 Primavera became one of the most durable of all.

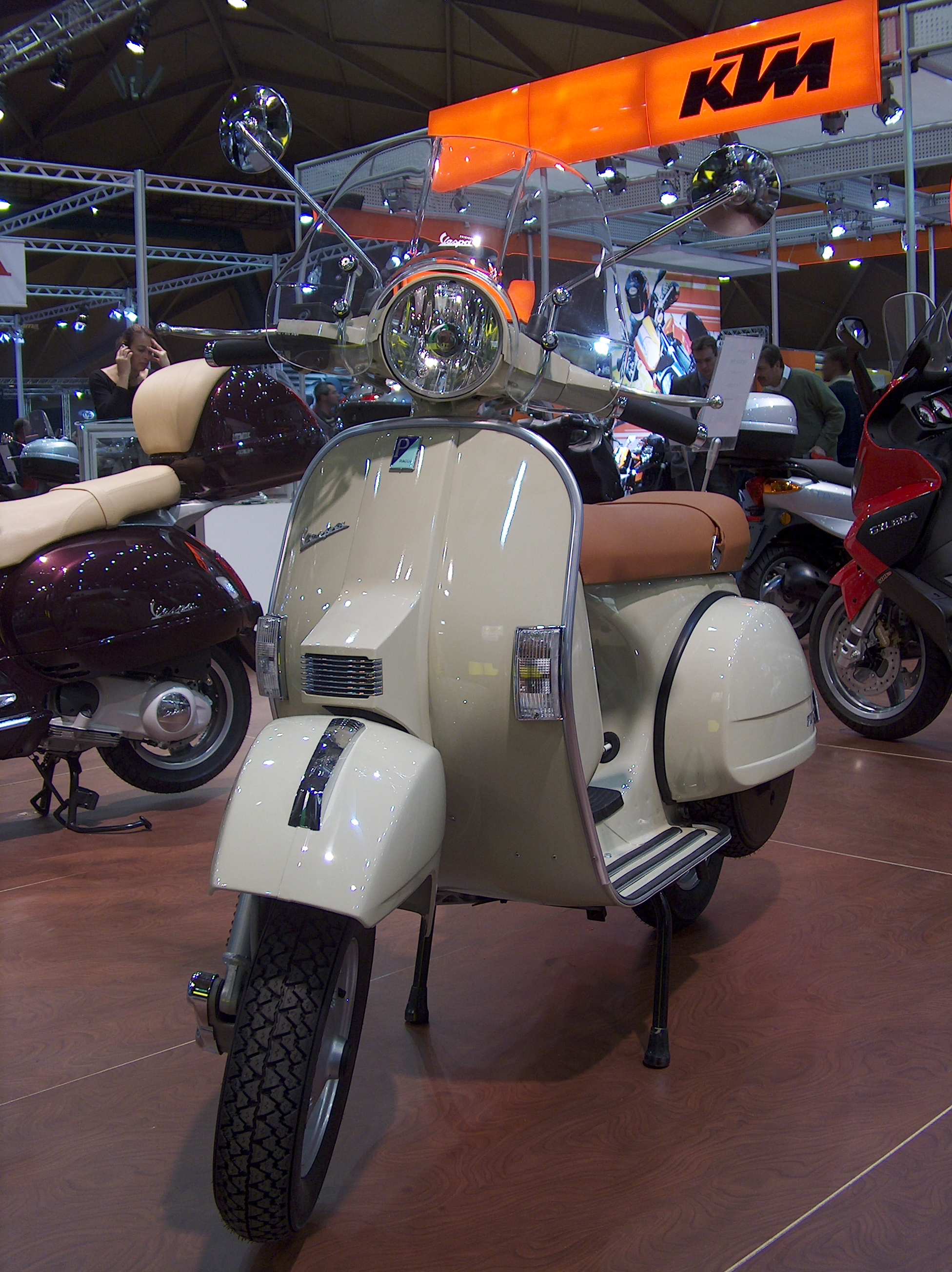
T5 Millennium from the PX series

Vespas came in two sizes, referred to as "largeframe" and "smallframe". The smallframe scooters came in 50 cc, 90 cc, 100 cc, and 125 cc versions, all using an engine derived from the 50 cc model of 1963, and the largeframe scooters in 125 cc, 150 cc, 160 cc, 180 cc, and 200 cc displacements using engines derived from the redesigned 125 cc VNA engine from 1957.

The largeframe Vespa evolved into the PX range in the late 1970s and was produced in 125, 150 and 200 cc versions until July 2007. Starting in 1981, an 80cc version was available as well. Piaggio reintroduced the PX 125 and 150 models in 2011, with a revised EURO3 compliant engine.

The smallframe evolved into the PK range in the early 1980s, although some vintage-styled smallframes were produced for the Japanese market as late as the mid-1990s.

== 1950s and beyond ==
The ET model range stuck true to the wasp/aero design principles. It was lighter, more aerodynamic, had an automatic gearbox and could take a series of engines from a 50 cc in either two-stroke or four-stroke, up to a 150 cc four stroke.

=== Under new ownership ===
In 1959 Piaggio came under the control of the Agnelli family, the owners of car maker Fiat S.p.A. Vespa thrived until 1992 when Giovanni Alberto Agnelli became CEO, but Agnelli was already suffering from cancer and died in 1997. In 1999 Morgan Grenfell Private Equity acquired Piaggio, but a quickly hoped-for sale was dashed by a failed joint venture in China.

By 2003 the company found itself close to bankruptcy. Continual management changes and great sums spent on many different plans and products had saddled Piaggio with debt and left it vulnerable to competition from cheaper Asian rivals. Despite this, the brand was still well-known and products like the Vespa ET4 were gaining positive publicity. In October 2003 Roberto Colaninno made an initial investment of €100 million through his holding company Immsi S.p.A. in exchange for just under a third of Piaggio and the mandate to run it. Chief executive Rocco Sabelli redesigned the factory to Japanese principles so that every Piaggio scooter could be made on any assembly line.

In 2004 the company introduced a gas-electric hybrid scooter and a scooter with two wheels at the front and one at the back.

Piaggio acquired scooter and motorcycle maker Aprilia in 2006 and in that same year Piaggio shares were launched onto the Borsa Italiana with the listing symbol PIAGF.

=== Relaunch in North America ===
Piaggio first came back into the market in 2001 with the ET2 (two stroke 50 cc) and ET4 (four stroke 150 cc). In 2004, the PX (model year 2005) was reintroduced to North America to meet market demand for the classic Vespa design. Growth in the US market and worldwide environmental concerns meant a need for larger and cleaner engines, so Vespa developed the LEADER (Low Emissions ADvanced Engine Range) series of four-stroke engines. The larger Granturismo frame, with larger 12-inch (300 mm) wheels, was introduced to handle the additional power. The bike in 2006 spawned the iconic GTS-250ie version, with an upgraded suspension and the new QUASAR (QUArter-liter Smooth Augmented Range) 250 cc fuel-injected engine, capable of 80+ mph. As of the end of 2010 the GTS 250 has been replaced by the GTS 300 which has a 278cc fuel – injected engine. In 2005, the ET was withdrawn from Europe and North America and replaced by a new small-frame scooter, the LX range. These were available in the US in 50 cc and 150 cc versions, while Europeans could choose a 50 cc, 125 cc and 150 cc..

== Design and culture icon ==
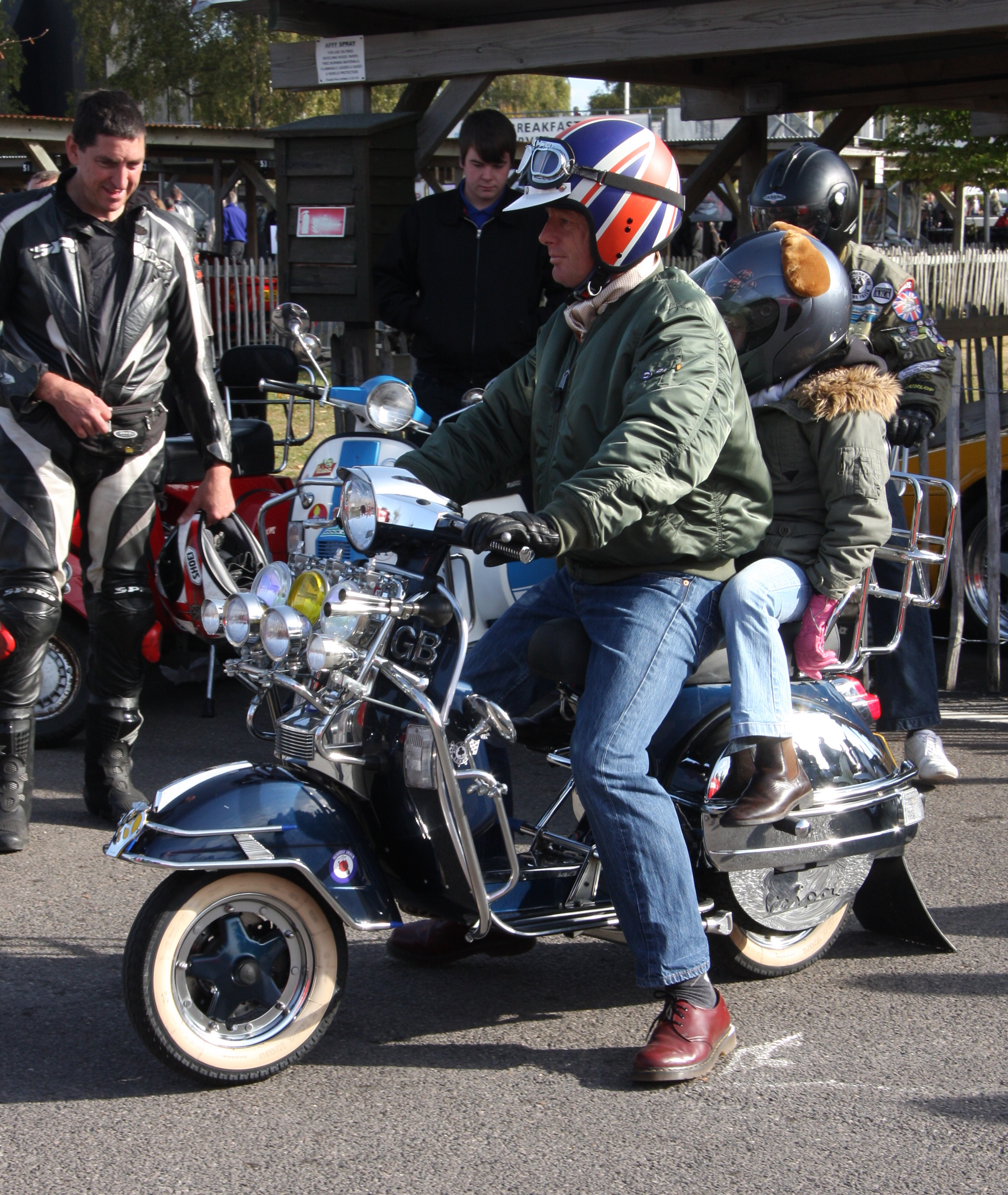
Modified Vespa as popular in the mods/skinhead culture

In recent years, many urban commuters have purchased new or restored Vespas. A shortage of available parking for automobiles in large urban areas and the Vespa's low running costs are two reasons for the increase in Vespa (and other scooter) popularity. The cultural use of the scooter as a recreational vehicle with a sub-cultural following in the US, Canada and parts of Europe and Japan has also contributed to the rise in Vespa ownership. In contrast, the Vespa is considered a utilitarian vehicle for hauling products and sometimes up to 5 family members in much of Asia and Mexico.

In the 2000s Indonesia, classic Vespa culture was born as people treat Vespa as hobby, recreational, and historic vehicle, although many still use them as regular transportation. In this era, very low priced and abundance stocks of used Vespa models from 1970s–1990s leads to people using Vespa as a form of modification to express their freedom and rebel. Eventually, the "Vespa Extreme" culture was born in this era, where Vespa users heavily even extremely customizing their vespa until it really have completely different form compared the original shape of standard Vespa scooters, in respect to values such as freedom, rebellion, and unestablished-ness.

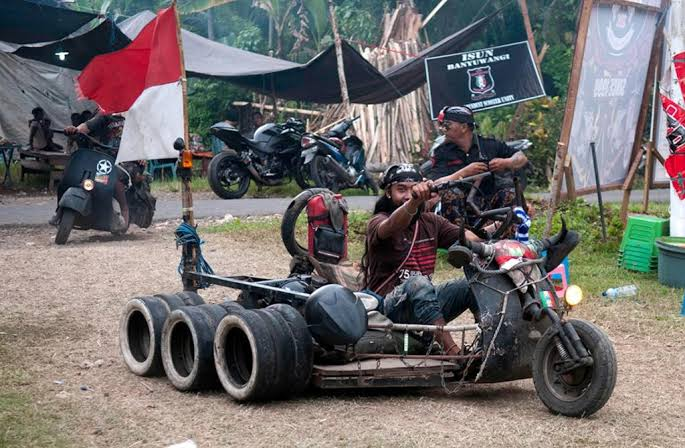
Vespa Extreme member and their ride

Since 2010s until now, classic Vespas continued to have a large group of enthusiasts across Indonesia who kept vintage scooters on the road by rebuilding, restoring, and adding performance-enhancing engine parts as the stock parts would wear out. Vintage Vespas also saw resurgence in price as people see more historic value in the classic Vespa scooters, especially one with original condition (paint, body part, engine, etc.)

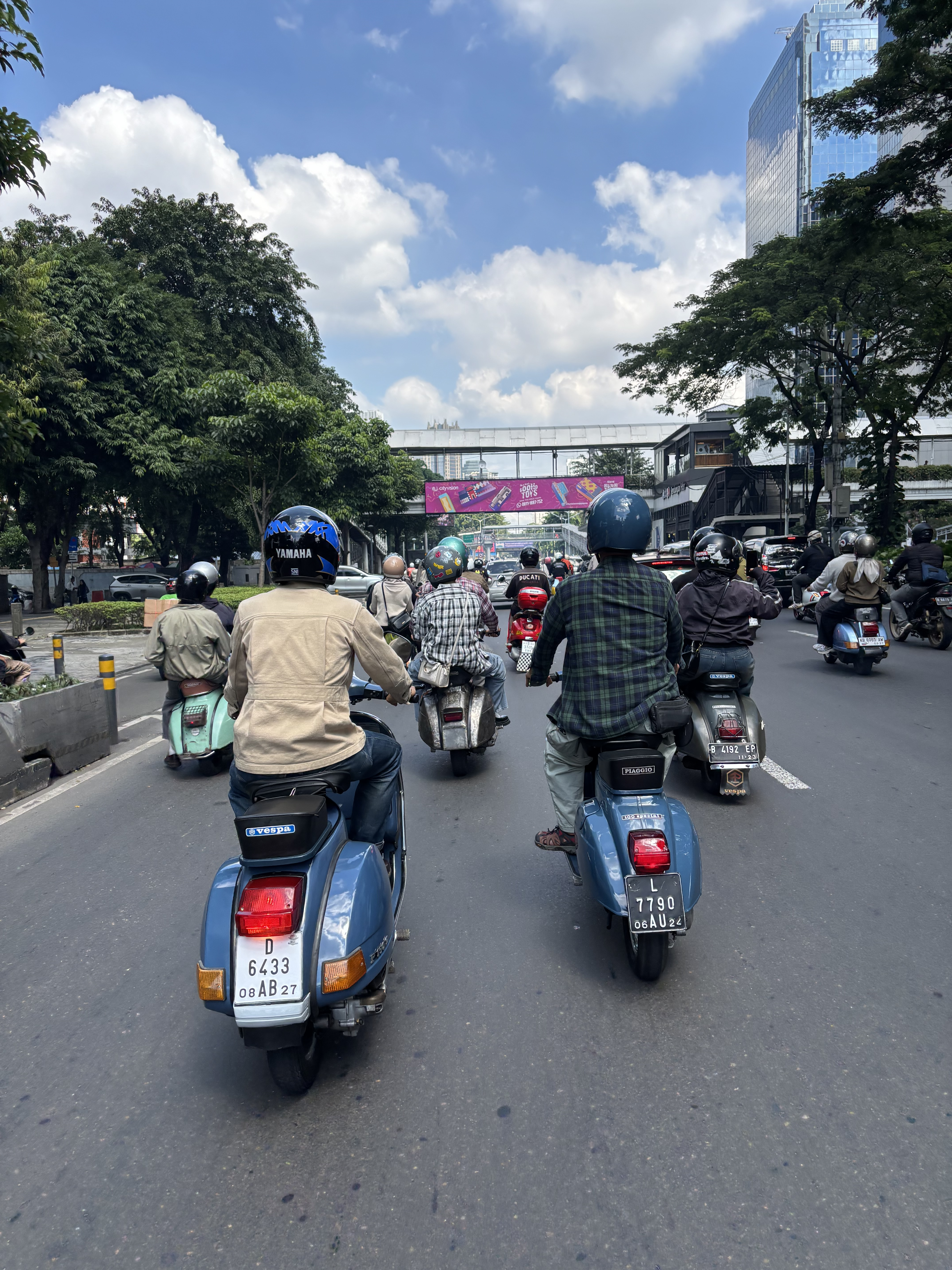
Vespa Riders Strolls Around The Street of Jakarta in The Jakarta Mods May Day 2025 Parade

This resurgence in interest in vintage motor scooters has also spawned a scooter restoration industry, with many restored Vespas being exported from Thailand, Vietnam and Indonesia to the rest of the world.

There is a Piaggio Museum & Gift Shop adjacent to the plant in central Pontedera, near Pisa, Tuscany. The permanent exhibition includes those items which toured venues such as the Guggenheim in New York and the Centre Pompidou in Paris. Also on display is a model personally customised by Salvador Dalí in 1962.

The Miami Auto Museum in North Miami, Florida, claims to have largest collection of Vespa scooters with over 400 items.

== Global markets ==
=== Europe ===
Vespa's largest market is in Italy, but as a result of the Mod subculture that developed in the 1960s, the United Kingdom is Vespa's second largest global market—and at one point in the 1960s, its largest. The appeal of the Vespa to the style-conscious mods was the weather protection. Their counterparts, the rockers rode classic British motorcycles such as Triumph Bonneville and BSAs, and needed to wear leathers against the elements. Mods would modify their Vespas, adding lights, mascots, accessories, various racks and crash bars. A new lifestyle evolved in the UK, with thousands attending scooter rallies..

The dominance of the Vespa declined through the 1970s, as small car ownership increased and cheap and reliable commuter bikes like the Honda Super Cub hit sales. Despite the introduction of the more modern 'P' range in the 1970s, the lack of development cost Vespa, and like other markets, the sales fell off drastically in the economic boom of the 1980s. Then Vespa introduced the trendy automatic ET2, the city of London introduced the congestion charge and—partly with celebrity chef Jamie Oliver's indirect help from his BBC2 TV series—sales suddenly leapt.

=== Indonesia ===
Indonesia have imported Vespa Scooters since the early 1950s, but not until 1972 was Indonesia able to build their own Vespas through PT Danmotors Vespa Indonesia (DMVI).

In the Mid-1970s, Danmotors reached their peak sales performance for the Vespa Scooters, making Indonesia the second-largest global market for Vespa aside from Italy itself. Sales performance continued to rise through the 1980s and finally began to fall in the 1990s as more modern and cheaper Japanese manufactured motorcycle gained favor among customers.

=== North America ===
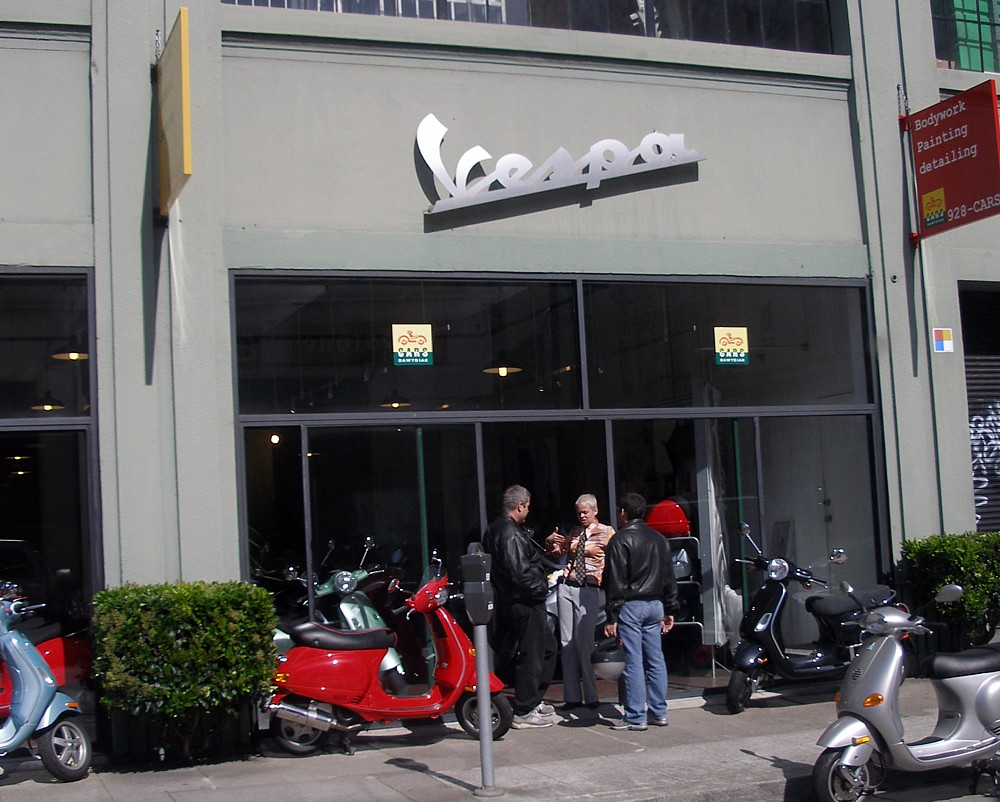
A Vespa Boutique in San Francisco

Much as Vespa had used the Cushman Army scooter as inspiration for its original design, Vespa in turn made scooters for Sears, Roebuck & Company (labeled and marketed as "Allstate" scooters) and Cushman after World War II.

Imported by Morton Colby of Colby General Tire Company, 662 East Fordham Road, Bronx, New York, the Sears models were 3- and 4-speed 125 cc Vespas rebadged as Sears Allstate Cruiseaires. Innocenti also distributed their Lambretta brand via Montgomery Ward's catalogue during this post-World War II period. These were the premier brands of scooters, bringing premium pricing to many, including farmers, whose link to the outside world was via purchases made in these catalogues. Cushman sold rebadged Vespa scooters as Cushmans, but many Cushman dealers refused to market a "foreign" machine. However, collectors prize the Cushman Vespa because it is relatively rare..

Two expensive product-liability lawsuits, increased competition from Japanese scooters, and certain states' passing so-called "green laws" led to the bankruptcy of Vespa's American importer and the withdrawal of Vespa from the US market in late 1981.

During 1981–2001, despite an absence of United States domestic sales, Vespas continued to have a core group of enthusiasts who kept vintage scooters on the road by rebuilding, restoring, and adding performance-enhancing engine parts as the stock parts would wear out..

Vespa returned to the American market in 2001 with a new, more modern style ET series, in 50 cc two and four stroke, and 150 cc four-stroke. "These adjustments in engine power and the production of high-end “touring" Vespas make it apt for long-distance driving." According to the Motorcycle Industry Council, U.S. scooter sales increased fivefold over six years, swelling from 12,000 units in 1997 to 69,000 units in 2002. Vespa sales in the U.S. increased 27 percent between 2001 and 2002. The 65 "Vespa Boutiques" scattered throughout the U.S. gave scooterists a place to buy, service, and customize Vespa scooters, and outfit themselves in everything from Vespa watches and helmets to Vespa jackets, T-shirts, and sunglasses. Vespa restarted its American sales effort, opening its first boutique on Ventura Boulevard in Sherman Oaks, California..

In light of vastly-increasing US sales, Vespa developed the GT, offered as a 200 cc four-stroke and a 125 cc variant in Europe. In 2004, Vespa reintroduced a modernized PX 150 to the United States. In the fall of 2005, Piaggio offered their largest-selling Vespa scooter ever, the 250 cc-engined GTS250, available in Europe with ABS. In 2009, Vespa released the GTS 300 which can cruise at 105–113 km/h (65–70 mph).

=== Asia/Pacific ===
Vespa have exported Scooters to Australia since the 1960s. For decades the Indian market was served by licensed versions built by Bajaj and LML. Since 2012 Piaggio has made Vespa scooters for India itself, at a plant in Baramati in Maharashtra. Vespa produces some of its scooters in Vietnam, and has also sold its Italian ones there.

== Production outside Italy ==
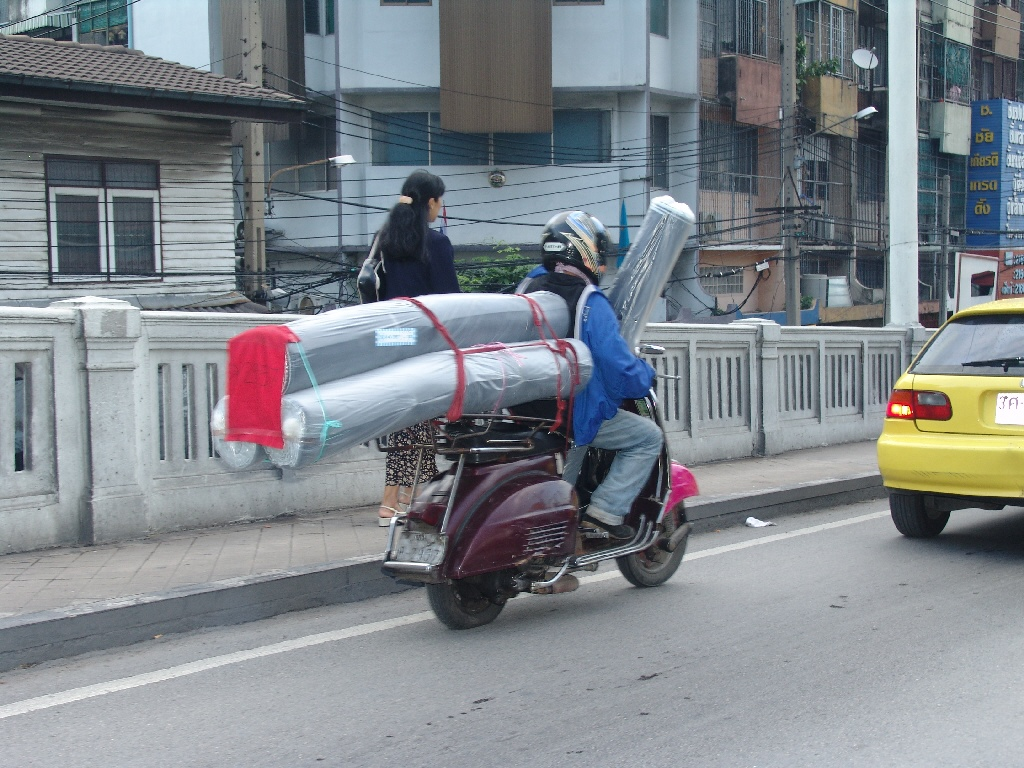
Bangkok: Vespa in use to haul cargo

Vespa scooters were sold beyond Europe and North America. When expanding into these markets it was common for Vespa to partner with, or license certain models to, existing manufacturers..

=== India ===
Piaggio first licensed the production of Vespa scooters in India to Bajaj Auto in the 1960s. In 1971, Piaggio's license was not renewed as a part of then Prime Minister Indira Gandhi's changes to foreign ownership rules, which favoured Indian control over foreign brands. When the licence expired, Bajaj lost the right to use the Vespa name, but not the ability to manufacture scooters using the knowledge and tooling it had already lawfully acquired, and Bajaj continued to produce scooters based on the Vespa design, namely the Chetak.

Another Vespa partner in India was that of LML Motors. Beginning as a joint-venture with Piaggio in 1983, LML, in addition to being a large parts supplier for Piaggio, produced the P-Series scooters for the Indian market. In 1999, after protracted dispute with Piaggio, LML bought back Piaggio's stake in the company and the partnership ceased. LML continued to produce (and also exported) the P-Series variant known as the Stella in the U.S. market and by other names in different markets. LML Factory which produced these P-Series variants issued a notice of insolvency on 2 June 2017 and closed down permanently in 2018.

In the 2012 Auto Expo held in New Delhi, the iconic Vespa re-entered the Indian market. Piaggio unveiled its range of scooters at the Expo. This became the first such venture of Piaggio in India without a local partner.

=== Indonesia ===
PT Danmotors Vespa Indonesia (DMVI) was a joint venture between Indonesian interests and the East Asiatic Company, which was based in Denmark. Between 1972 and 2001, it produced Vespas under license for the Indonesian market. In 1976 approximately 40,000 units were produced giving DMVI the third biggest share of the Indonesian scooter market. Government tax incentives allowed these scooters to be exported to Thailand at less than the domestic market price, so that they would be economically competitive.

From 1972 to 1977, DMVI only built 90 and 150cc models, while 100cc, 150cc, and 200cc model were built in the 1980s.

From 1972 onwards the company was located at a purpose-built factory in Pulo Gadung. This was greatly expanded in 1977 to also manufacture sub-components, following a government decree that a higher domestically built proportion of these should be used. Sub-components were also bought from other Indonesian manufacturers after their quality had been approved by Piaggio. In early 2000s, the company changed its name to PT Danmotor Indonesia.

Production from PT Danmotor Indonesia (DMVI) ceased in early 2000s as the company was impacted from 1998 Asian monetary crisis and the surge of Japanese-manufactured mopeds. The last classic 2-stroke Vespa built by the company was approximately sold in 2007.

=== Taiwan ===
Vespa has had various partnerships and presence in Taiwan. In 1965, Taiwan Vespa Co. Ltd was licensed for Vespa scooter production. From 1972 to 1982, Vespa entered into a collaboration with scooter manufacturer PGO. In 1978, Vespa entered into a collaboration with TGB, which to some extent, continues to this day (namely with CVT transmission production)..

=== United Kingdom ===
In 1951 the financially troubled motorcycle manufacturer Douglas started production of Piaggio licensed Vespa scooters in Bristol, with a market to include some Commonwealth countries as well as the UK. It was a year which also saw the first meeting of the newly-formed Vespa scooter clubs with nearly 20,000 riders showing up for the event. Westinghouse took over Douglas in 1955, and while motorcycle production was stopped in 1957, Vespa production in Britain continued until 1965.

Douglas was more than a simple assembly plant for parts imported from Piaggio; many of the models made by Douglas had a high percentage of content manufactured by Douglas (eg cylinder heads, gear clusters, brake drums and other mechanical parts) or by UK supply companies (eg seats, carburetors, tyres, and some electrical components were made in the UK). Models made by Douglas were primarily the Vespa 125 and 150 (VBB).

Douglas produced Vespas which were often outdated compared to current Italian models. Douglas failed to meet the production numbers hoped for by Piaggio, though after production ceased in 1965, Douglas remained the UK importer for Vespa scooters until its demise in 1982.

=== Spain ===
In 1953 a factory in Madrid began production of Motovespas, production continued until 2000. The factory was demolished in 2001..

=== Soviet Union ===
Between 1956 and 1966 an unauthorised, reverse-engineered version of the Vespa was built and sold in the USSR by Vyatka. This was withdrawn after protests by Piaggio.

== Racing ==
In the 1950s and early 1960s Vespa and Lambretta scooters were raced competitively against motorcycles, often winning the races. In the mid-1960s, motorcycle engines became larger and faster, and a gap was created—along with varying cc classifications. Since the 1980s, Vespa and Lambretta racing has grown into a serious sport in the United States. There are various classes in the United States, depending on the racing association. They are generally:

- Small Frame Class: Open class up to 152 cc
- Automatics Class
- Specials Class

== Models ==
There have been many different versions of the Vespa. Today five series are in production: the CVT transmission Sprint, Primavera, GTS, GTV, Elettrica, and 946.

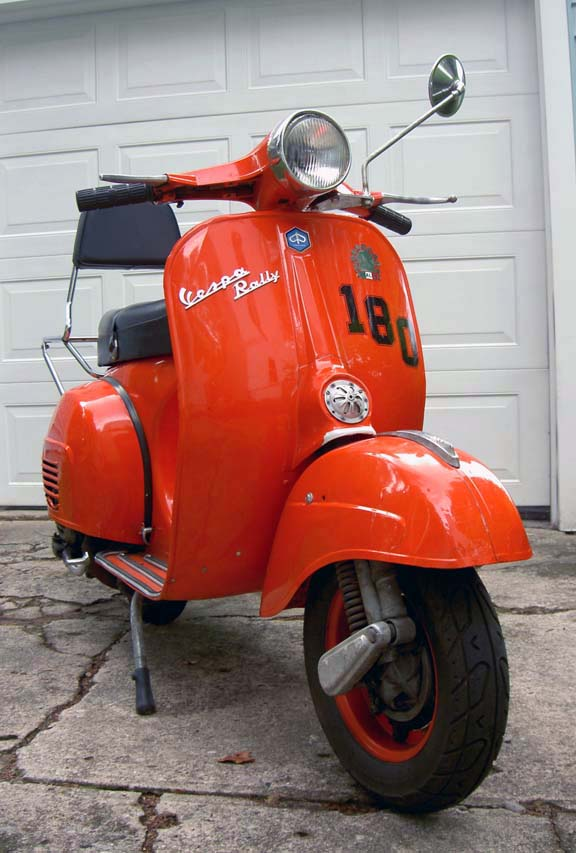
1969 Vespa Rally 180

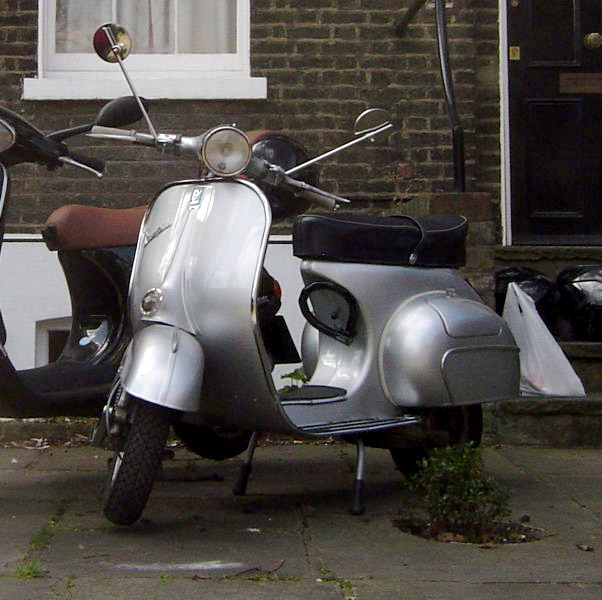
1963 VBB Standard 150

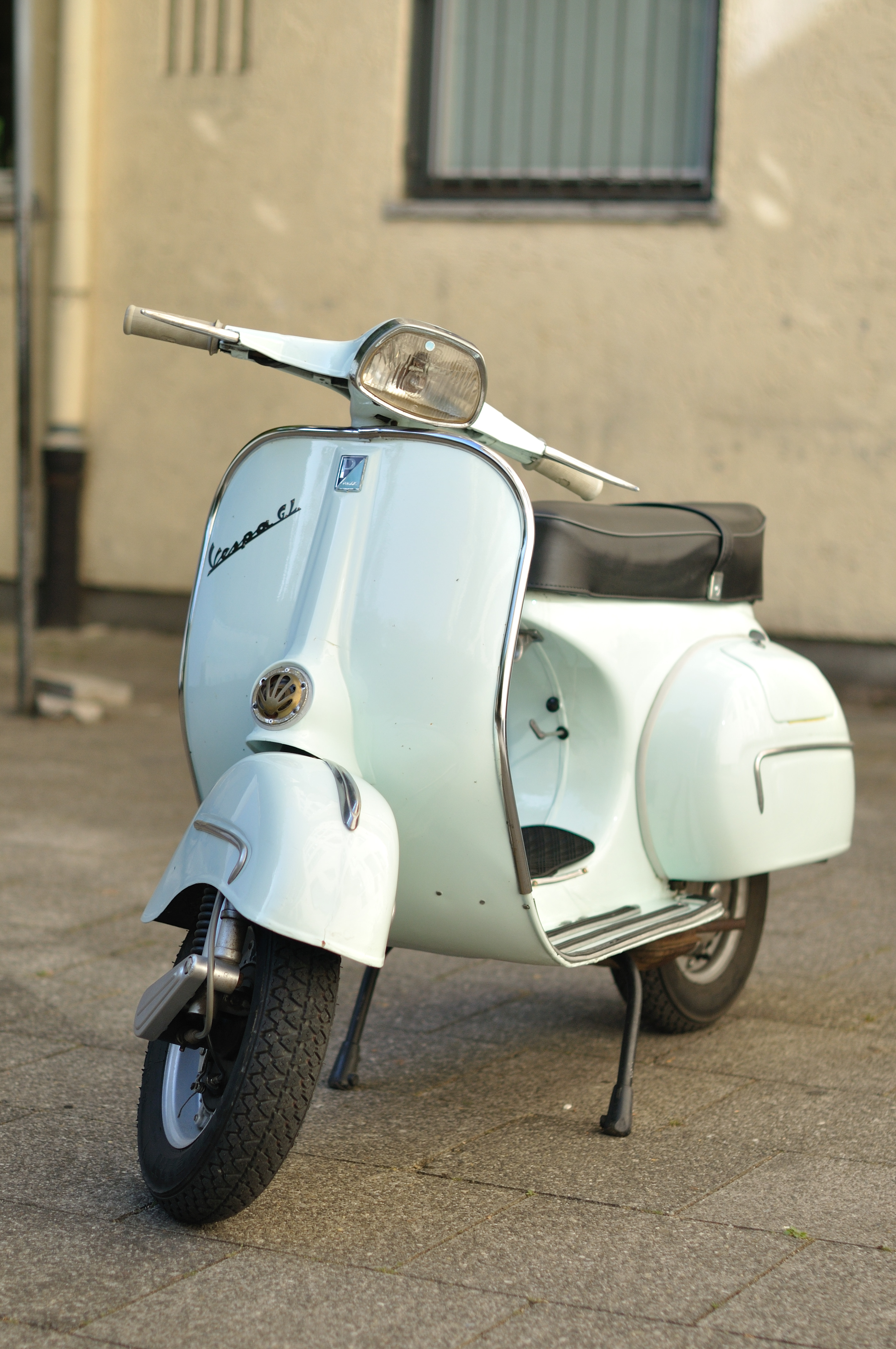
1963 Vespa 150 GL

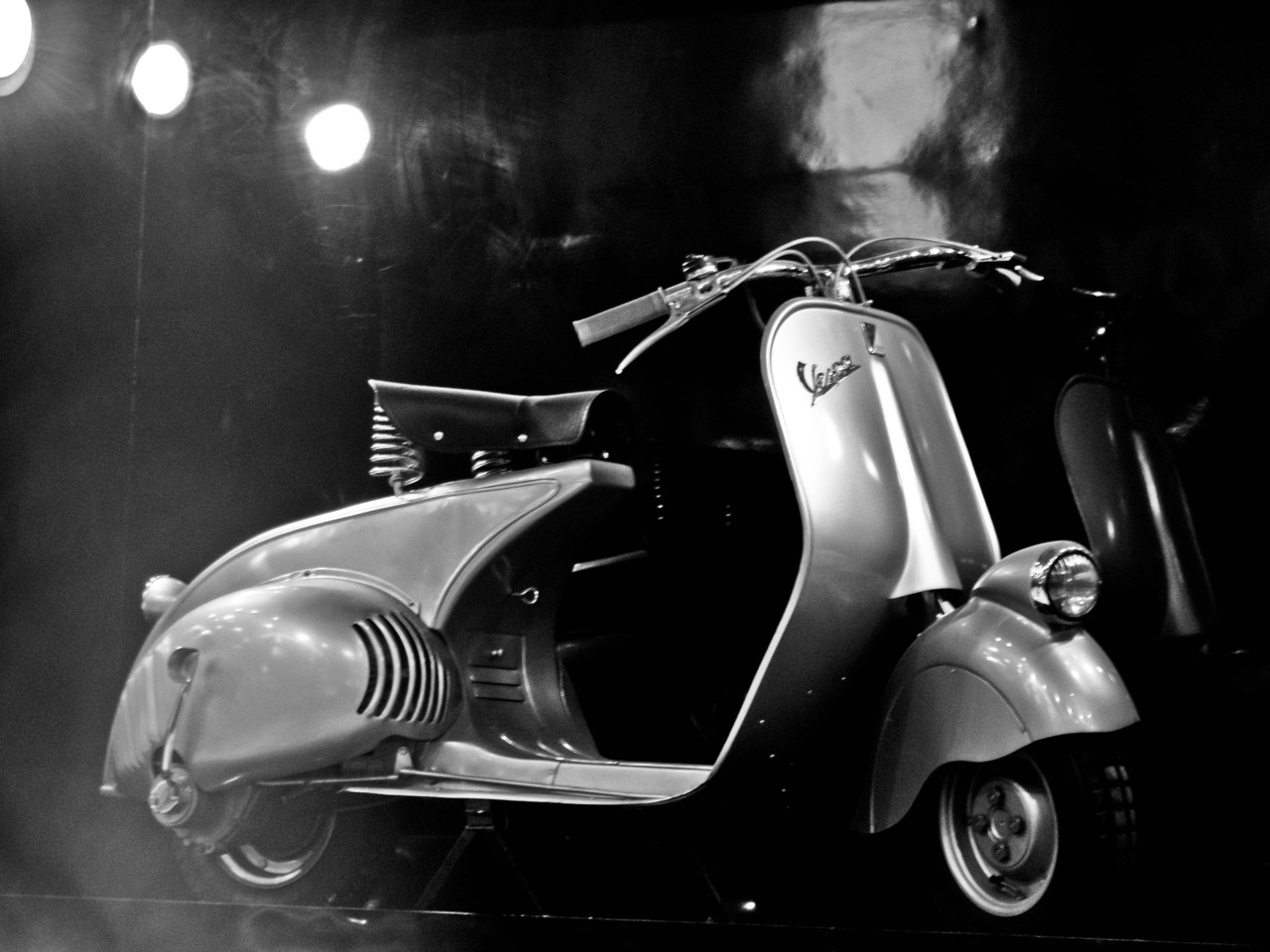
Vintage Vespa AutoExpo, Delhi, India

=== Historic ===
- Paperino – the original prototype made in 1945 at Biella
- Vespa 150 TAP – A Vespa modified for the French paratroopers that carried (not fired) an antitank weapon.
- VNC Super 125
- VBC Super 150
- VBA 150
- VB1 150
- VBB 150
- 125 Sport (1950-51)
- 125 (1958-60)
- 125 (1959-61)
- 125 Second series (1961-63)
- 125 third series (1963-66)
- 125 GT (1966-73)
- V98 (1946)
- V98 Second Series (1947-48)
- 125 (1950-52)
- 125 Second series (1953-54)
- 125 3rd series (1955-57)
- 125 U – U is for utilitaria (English – economic). 1953 model with a price of 110,000 Italian Lira (about US$175), 7,000 were produced
- 125 Sei Giorni (1951-53)
- GS 150 (1955)
- GS 150 Second series (1956-58)
- GS 150 3rd series (1958-61)
- GS 160 (1962-63)
- GS 160 Second Series (1963-64)
- SS 180
- Vespa 90 (3 spd)
- Vespa 50 (3 spd)
- SS50 (1965-73)
- SS90 (1965-71)
- 150 (1958-60)
- 150 Second Series (1960-67)
- 150 GL (1962-65)
- 90 Racer
- 90 (1961-67)
- 125 Super (1965-69)
- 125 TS (1975-78)
- 100 Sport
- 125 Nuova (1965-67)
- 125 GTR (1968-75)
- VLB 150 Sprint (1965-74)
- VLB 150 Sprint Veloce (Vespa Sprint) (1969-79)
- 150 Super (1965-69)
- 180 Super Sport (1964-68)
- Rally 180 (1968-73)
- Rally 200 (1972-79)
- 125 Nuova (VMA-1T) – Prelude to Primavera
- Primavera 125 (1967-73)
- Primavera 125 2nd series (1974-77)
- Primavera 125 3rd series (1976-77)
- Primavera 125 ET3 (1976-83)
- 50 Elestart (1969-75)
- 50 Elestart second series (1975-76)
- 50 L (1966-70)
- 50 N (1963-71)
- 50 R (1969-75)
- 50 R second series (1969-75)
- 50 S (1963-68)
- 50 Special (1969-75)
- 50 Special second series (1975-83)
- 50 Special Elestart
- 50 Sprinter / 50 SR (D)
- 50 Special Revival (Limited to 3,000 Italy-only numbered units, released in 1991)
- COSA 125 (1988-91)
- COSA 150 (1988-91)
- COSA 200 (1988-91)
- COSA 125 Cosa 2 (1992-95)
- COSA 150 Cosa 2 (1992-95)
- COSA 200 Cosa 2 (1992-95)
- PE 200 1977-82)
- P 80 / P 80 E (France)
- P 80 X / PX 80 E (France)
- PK 50 Roma (Automatic)
- PK 50 S (1982-86)
- PK 50 S Automatica (1984-86)
- PK 50 XLS (1986-89)
- PK 50 XL Plurimatic (1986-89)
- PK 50 Rush (1988-90)
- PK 50 N (1989-91)
- PK 50 N Speedmatic (1989-91)
- PK 50 FL2 (1992-96)
- PK 50 FL2 Speedmatic (1992-96)
- PK 80 S / Elestart
- PK 80 S Automatica / Elestart
- PK 100 S / Elestart
- PK 100 S Automatica
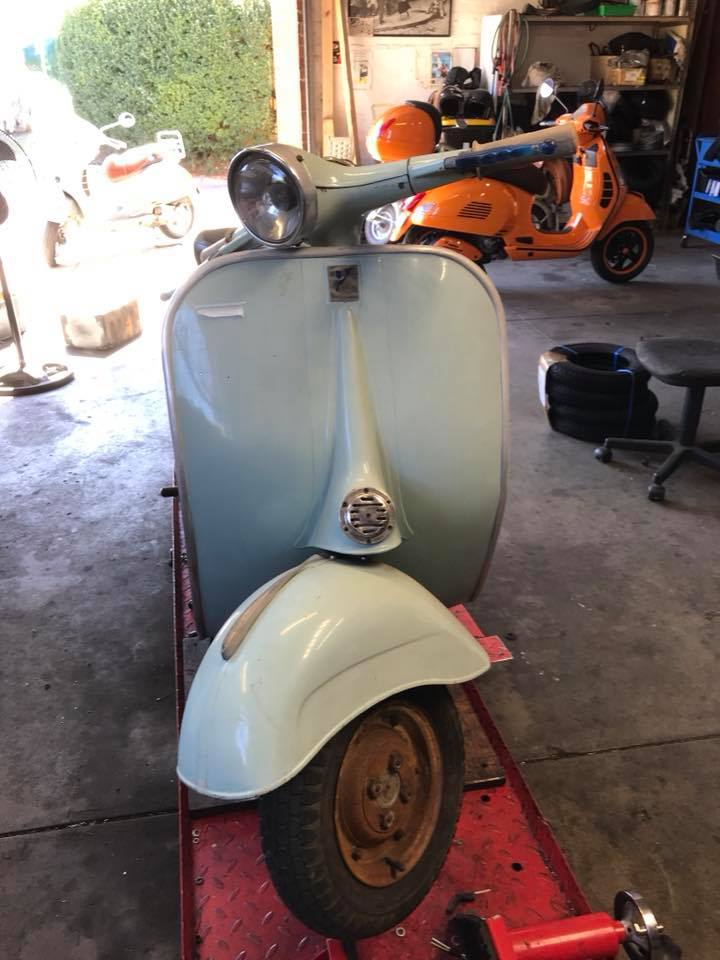
- VNA 1961 Model vespa in workshop
  PK 100 XL
- PK 125 ETS (1984-85)
- PK 125 XL / Elestart
- PK 125 S (1982-86)
- PK 125 S Automatica (1983-86)
- PK 125 (1978-80)
- PK 125 FL2 (1991-96)
- PK 125 FL2 Plurimatic (1991-96)
- PK 125 XLS (1986-90)
- PK 125 XL Plurimatic (1987-90)
- PX 150 Arcobaleno (1983-92)
- P 125 X
- PX 125 E/Electronic
- PX 150 (1978-80)
- P 150 XE (Indonesia only)
- P 150 S (Indonesia only)
- P 150 SE (Indonesia only)
- PX 200 E FL
- PX 200 Serie Speciale (Limited to 400 UK-only numbered units)
- Vespa TX 200 (Spain only)
- PX-E 125 (1981-82)
- PX-E 150 (1981-82)
- PX-E 150 Arcobaleno (1984-92)
- PX-E 200 Arcobaleno (1983-92)
- PX T5 / Elestart (5 port engine 125 cc P series) (1985-90)
- T5 Classic (5 port engine 125 cc P series)
- T5 Millennium (5 port engine 125 cc P series) (Limited to 400 UK-only numbered units)

=== Recent ===
- Vespa Elettrica 45 kph (2019-21)
- ET2 50 Carburettor (1997-2005)
- ET2 50 FAST Injection (1997-2005)
- ET4 50 (1996-2004)
- ET4 125 (1996-2000)
- ET4 125 Second series (2000-05)
- ET4 150 (1999-2005)
- ET4 150 Second series (2000-05)
- ET8 150 (Rebadged ET4)
- GT 250 60 (2006-2010)

(60th anniversary limited run variant of GTS 250) Features the fender mounted headlight as a tribute to the original Vespas.

- GTL 125 (2003-2007)
- GTL 200 (2003-2008)
- GTS 125 (2007-16)
- GTS 125 Super ie (2009-16)
- GTS 125 Super Sport (2011-16)
- GTS 125 70th (2016)
- GTS 125 I-Get (2017-18)
- GTS 125 75th Anniversario (2021-22)
- GTS 125 Racing Sixties (2020-21)
- GTS 125 Super Sport series 2 (2019-22)
- GTS 125 Super series 2 (2019-22)
- GTS 125 Touring series 2 (2019-22)
- GTS 125 series 2 (2019-22)
- GTS 150 (2017-18)
- GTS 250 ie (2005-10)
- GTS 300 Super ie (2008-16)
- GTS 300 Super Sport (2010-16)
- GTS 300 Touring (2011-16)
- GTS 300 Sei Giorni (2017-18)
- GTS 300 HPE series 2 (2019-20)
- GTS 300 HPE Touring series 2 (2019-22)
- GTS 300 HPE Yacht Club (2019-21)
- GTS 300 HPE Super series 2 (2019-22)
- GTS 300 HPE Super Sport series 2 (2019-22)
- GTS 300 HPE Sei Giorni series 2 (2019-22)
- GTS 300 HPE Notte (2019-22)
- GTS 300 HPE SuperTech series 2 (2019-22)
- GTS 300 HPE Racing Sixties (2020-21)
- GTS 300 75th Anniversario (2021-22)
- GTV 125 (2006-08)
- GTV 125 Navy (2008)
- GTV 250 (2006-2010)
- GTV 250 Navy (2008)
- GTV 300 Vespa 140th of Piaggio (18/4/2024-21/4/2024)
- LX 50 2T (2005-09)
- LX 50 4T (2005-09)
- LX 50 FL 2T (2009-2014)
- LX 50 FL 4T 4V (2009-2014)
- LX 50 Touring 2T (2010-2014)
- LX 50 Touring 4T 4V (2010-2014)
- LX 125 (2005-09)
- LX 125 FL ie (2009-2014)
- LX 125 Touring (2010-2014)
- LX 150 (2005-09)
- LX 150 FL ie (2009-2014)
- LX 150 Touring (2010-2014)
- LXV 50 (2006-08)
- LXV 50 Navy (2008)
- LXV 125 (2006-09)
- LXV 125 Navy (2008)
- Primavera 50 Disney Mickey Mouse Edition (2023)
- Primavera 50 Touring series 2 (2019)
- Primavera 50 Color Vibe (2023)
- Primavera 50 Pic Nic (2023)
- Primavera 50 Batik (2024)
- Primavera 50 Touring series 2 (2019)
- Primavera 50 (2014-18)
- Primavera 50 2T(2014-18)
- Primavera 50 Yacht Club (2019-21)
- Primavera 50 Touring (2014-18)
- Primavera 50 Wotherspoon (2020-22)
- Primavera 50 75th Anniversario (2021-22)
- Primavera 125 (2014-18)
- Primavera 125 50th (2018-19)
- Primavera 125 70th (2016-18)
- Primavera 125 Touring (2014-18)
- Primavera 125 75th Anniversario (2021-22)
- Primavera 125 Sean Wotherspoon (2020-22)
- Primavera 125 Color Vibe (2023)
- Primavera 125 Disney Mickey Mouse Edition (2023)
- Primavera 125 Pic Nic (2023)
- Primavera 125 Batik (2024)
- Primavera 125 Touring series 2 (2019)
- Primavera 150 Batik (2024)
- Primavera 150 (2014-18)
- Primavera 150 Touring (2014-18)
- Primavera 150 Wotherspoon (2020-22)
- Primavera 150 75th Anniversario (2021-22)
- Primavera 150 Touring series 2 (2019)
- Primavera 150 Color Vibe (2023)
- Primavera 150 Disney Mickey Mouse Edition (2023)
- PX 125 Classic (1993-96)
- PX 125 Disco (1997-99)
- PX 125 (2011-14)
- PX 125 150th Unification of Italy (2011)
- PX 125 70th (2016)
- PX 125 Catalysed Series 1 (1999-2001)
- PX 125 Catalysed Series 2 (2002-07)
- PX 125 30 Years (2007)

(A limited edition, only 1000 produced to celebrate the 30 years of the P range)

- PX 150 Classic (1993-96)
- PX 150 Disco (1997-99)
- PX 200 Classic (1993-96)
- PX 200 Disco (1997-99)
- PX 150 Time 2000 Series 1 (2000-2001)
- PX 150 Catalysed Series 1 (1999-2001)
- PX 150 Catalysed Series 2 (2001-07)
- PX 150 (2011-14)

in 2011 the PX series restarted to be produced in Italy after a 3-year absence because of the European Union restriction about Euro III engines emissions not followed. In occasion of the 150th anniversary of Italian union, Piaggio has proposed this special version, with a re-designed saddle but with the same "Vespa experience".

- PX 200 Classic (1993-96)
- PX 200 Disco (1997-99)
- S 50 2T (2007-10)
- S 50 4T 4V (2008-14)
- S 125 (2007-09)
- S 125 College (2010-14)
- S 125 ie (2009-14)
- S 150 (2008-09)
- S 150 ie (2009-14)
- Sprint 50 (2015-18)
- Sprint 50 S 2t (2015-18)
- Sprint 50 2t (2015-18)
- Sprint 50 Racing Sixties (2020-22)
- Sprint 50 Notte (2019-21)
- Sprint 50 Sport series 2 (2019- )
- Sprint 50 Justin Bieber (2022)
- Sprint 125 Sport Sport (2019-? )
- Sprint 125 series 2 (2019-?)
- Sprint 125 Racing Sixties (2019-21)
- Sprint 125 Notte (2019-21)
- Sprint 125 (2015-18)
- Sprint 125 S (2015-18)
- Sprint 150 Racing Sixties (2019-21)
- Sprint 150 (2015-18)
- Sprint 150 S (2015-18)
- Sprint 150 Justin Bieber (2022)
- Zafferano 50 cc and 125 cc (A limited edition, only 200 produced)
- Vespa 946 (2013-18)
- Vespa 946 Emporio Armani (2015-18)
- Vespa 946 Christian Dior (2022-23)
- Vespa 946 Dragon (2024)
- Vespa 946 Snake (2025)
- Vespa 946 10 Anniversario (2023)

=== Current ===
- GTS 125 Super Sport series 3 (2023- )
- GTS 125 Super series 3 (2023- )
- GTS 125 series 3 (2023- )
- GTS 125 Super Tech (2023- )
- GTV 300 (2023- )
- GTV 310 (2025- )
- GTS 300 (2023- )
- GTS 300 Super series 3 (2023- )
- GTS 300 Super Tech series 3 (2023- )
- GTS 310 80th Anniversary (2026)
- GTS 310 (2025- )
- GTS 310 Super (2025- )
- GTS 310 Super Tech (2025- )
- GTS 310 Edizione Ottantesimo (2026) Limited 1.946 items
- GTV Officina 8 300 HPE (2025- )
- GTV Officina 8 310 (2025- )
- Primavera 45 Elettrica (2020- )
- Primavera 45 Elettrica Red (2020- )
- Primavera 50 Officina 8 (2025- )
- Primavera 50 Red (2020- )
- Primavera 50 Sport (2019- )
- Primavera 50 series 2 (2019- )
- Primavera 50 Tech (2024- )
- Primavera 70 Elettrica (2020- )
- Primavera 70 Elettrica Red (2020- )
- Primavera 125 Officina 8 (2025- )
- Primavera 125 Red (2018- )
- Primavera 125 series 2 (2019- )
- Primavera 125 Sport (2019- )
- Primavera 125 Tech (2024- )
- Primavera 125 Gigi Edition (2026)
- Primavera 125 80th Anniversary (2026)
- Primavera 150 Red (2018- )
- Primavera 150 Officina 8 (2025- )
- Primavera 150 series 2 (2019- )
- Primavera 150 Sport (2019- )
- Primavera 150 Tech (2024- )
- Sprint 45 Elettrica (2020- )
- Sprint 50 S
- Sprint 125 S series 2
- Vespa 946 Red (2019- )
- Vespa 946 Horse (May 2026)

=== Vespa 946 ===
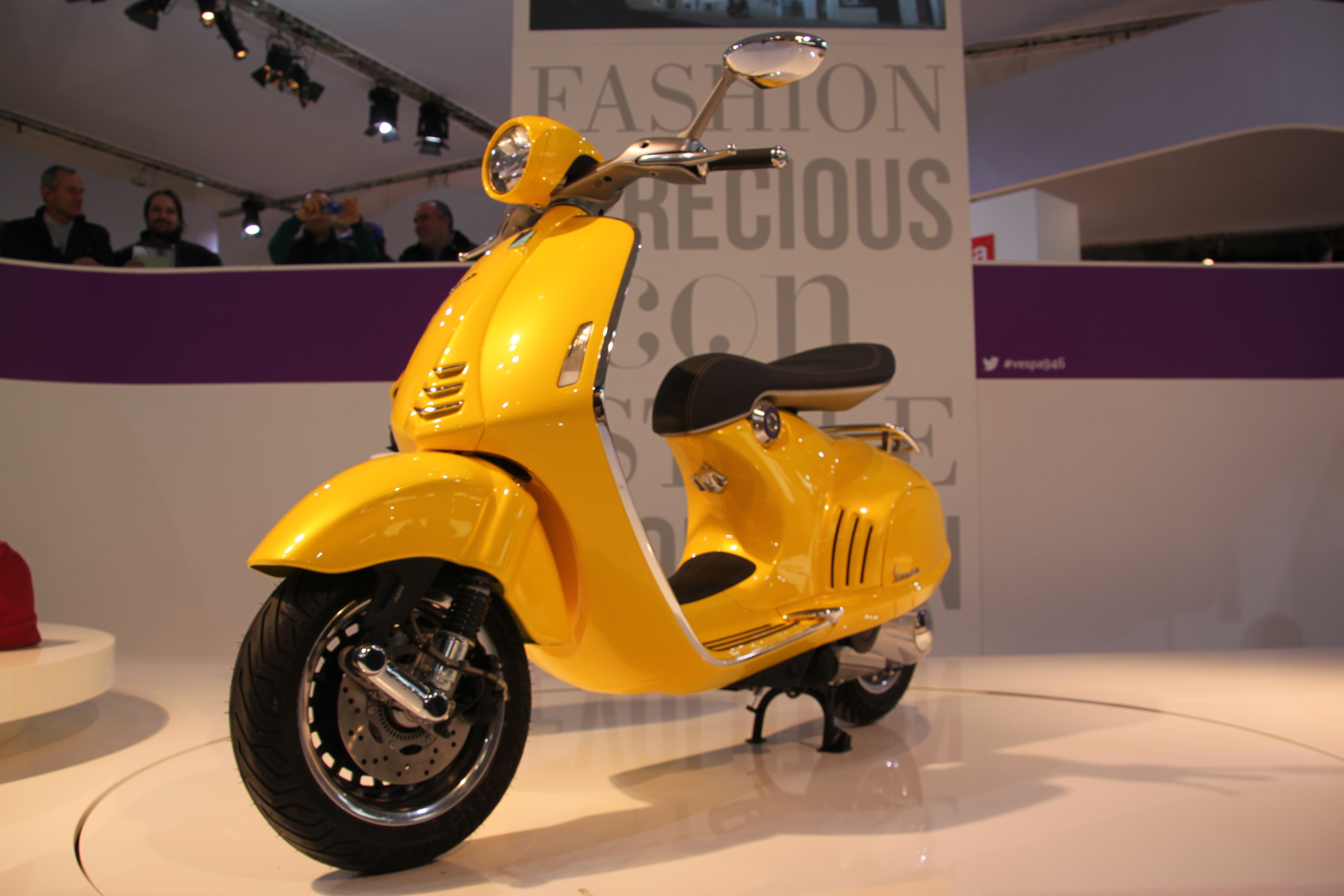
Vespa 946

The Vespa 946 is a scooter announced by Piaggio, sold under their Vespa brand, that sold starting in July 2013. Piaggio presented the retro-futurist Vespa Quarantasei concept, based on the 1945 Vespa MP6 prototype, at the 2011 EICMA motorcycle show. The final production version, renamed the Vespa 946, appeared the following year, at EICMA 2012. The 946 will be fitted with Piaggio's new air-cooled, three-valve, single-cylinder engine, with a claimed output of 11.7 hp (8.7 kW) for the 125 cc (7.6 cu in) displacement version, and 13 hp (9.7 kW) for the 150 cc (9.2 cu in) version.

=== Electric vehicles ===
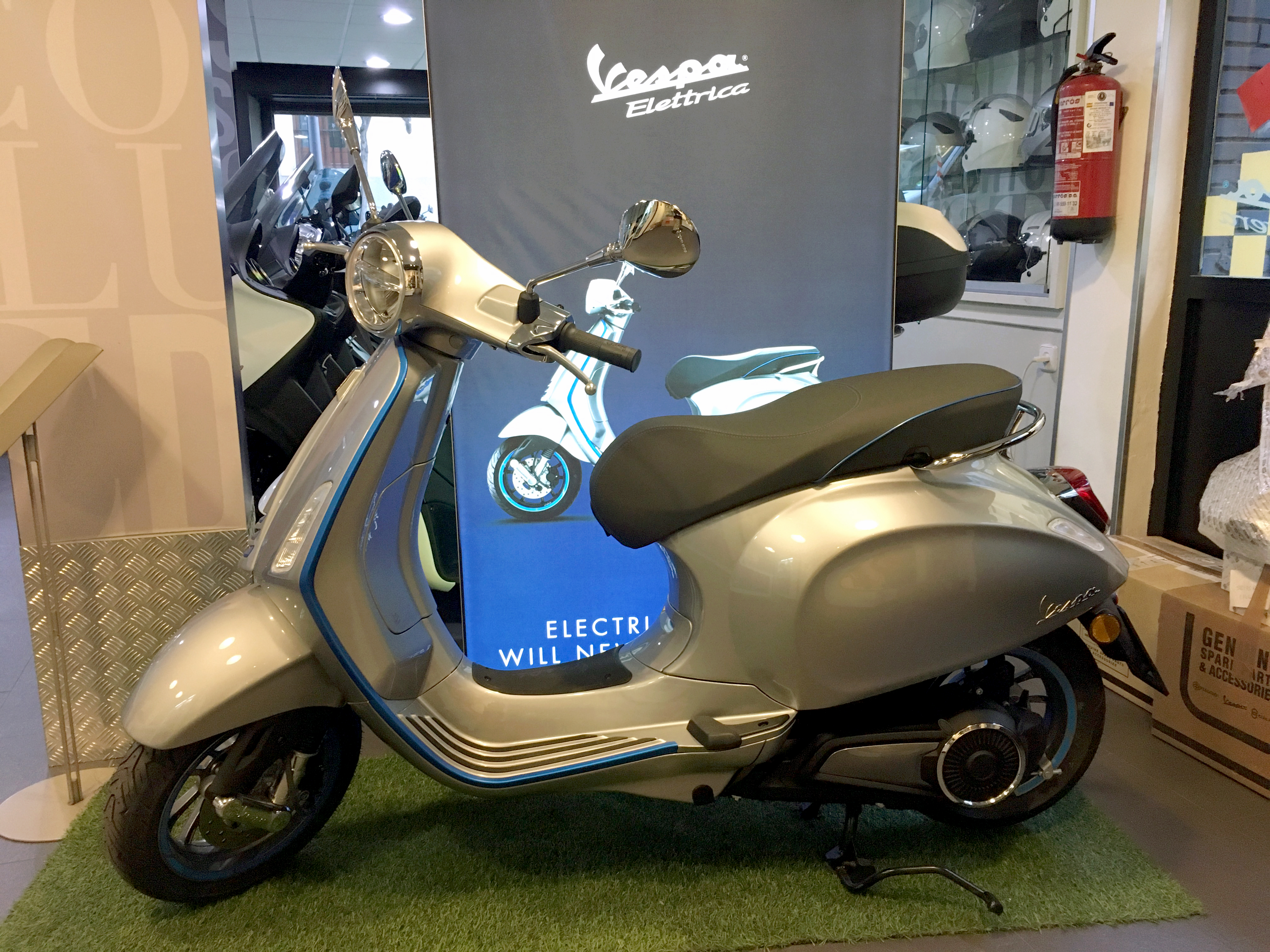
Electric Vespa Electrica in Madrid, Spain

Vespa Elettrica with a 2 kWh battery and a range of 100 km (62 mi). There will be an hybrid option as well with a range of 200 km. Piaggio started production in September 2018 and it was released at the beginning of 2019.

==== Hybrids ====
Piaggio/Vespa is developing a range of hybrid scooters. Two models are being developed at present, based on the Vespa LX 50 and the Piaggio X8 125.

=== Specials ===
One-offs and special machines:

- Montlhéry – produced in 1950 to break world records on the French circuit of the same name. It smashed 17 records in 10 hours
- Torpedo – 1951 125 cc special with counter-opposing pistons. Dino Mazzoncini set the world record on the kilometre at an average of 171 km/h

== See also ==
- List of companies of Italy
- List of motor scooter manufacturers and brands
- List of motorcycle manufacturers
- Vespa 400 – a car also made by Piaggio
