= Piaggio Vespa LX =

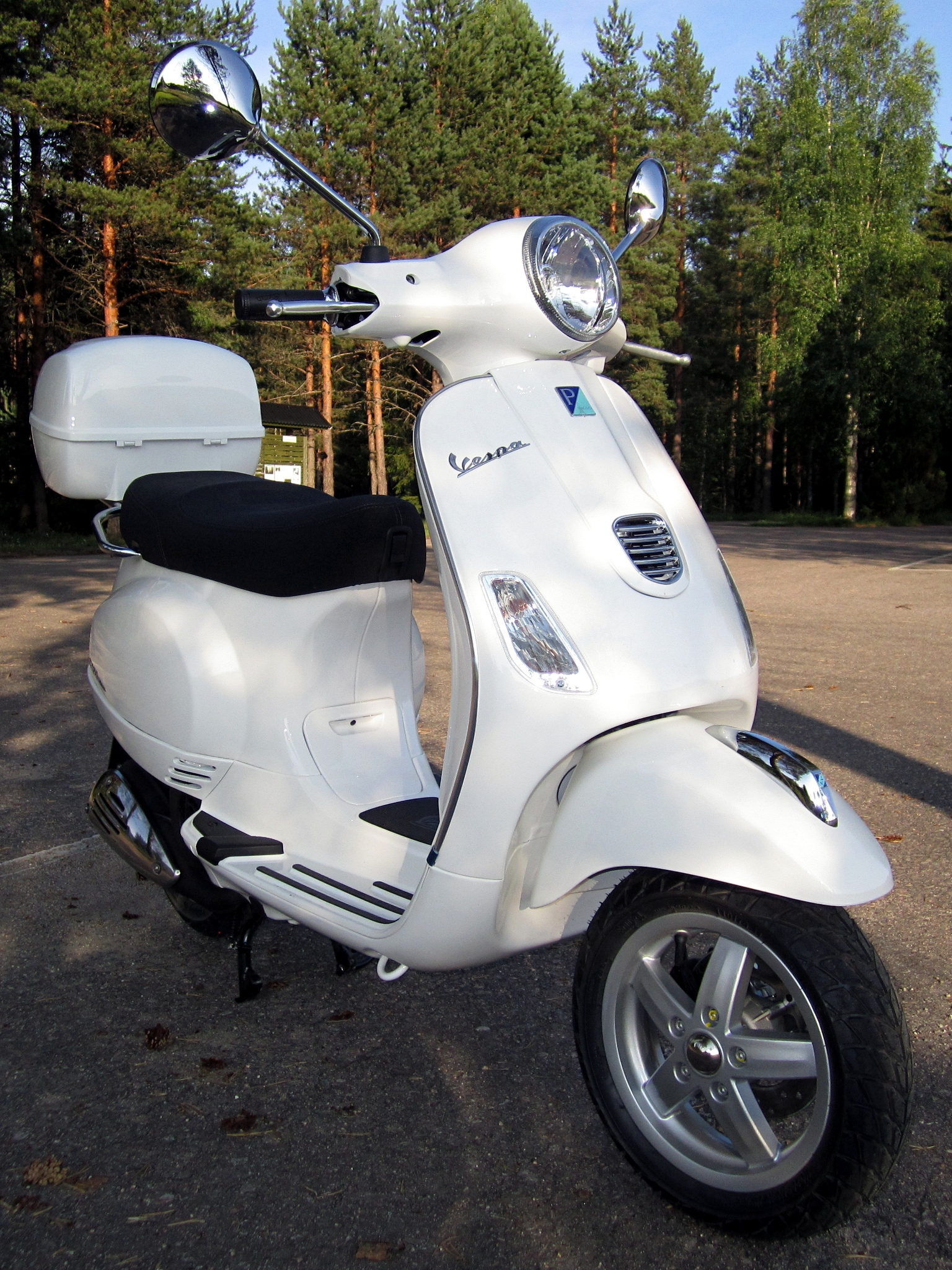
- Manufacturer: Piaggio
- Also called: Piaggio Vespa LXV; Piaggio Vespa S
- Production: 2005–2013 (Europe); 2009-present (Asia)
- Assembly: Italy: Pontedera; India: Baramati; Vietnam: Vĩnh Phúc
- Class: Scooter
- Transmission: CVT
- Wheelbase: 1,290 mm (50.8 in)
- Dimensions: L: 1,755 mm (69.1 in) (50); 1,770 mm (69.7 in) (125/150); W: 740 mm (29.1 in); H: 775 mm (30.5 in)
- Seat height: 765 mm (30.1 in) (50); 785 mm (30.9 in) (125/150)
- Fuel capacity: 6.6 L (402.8 cu in)

The Vespa LX is a scooter that was made by Piaggio from 2006 until 2014.

The LX 150 uses the same frame as the LX 50 but features a 150 cc engine capable of a listed maximum speed of 59 mph (95 km/h). The LX 150, like all modern Vespa scooters features a 4-stroke single overhead camshaft and steel frame construction. Vespa claims 70–75 mpg_{‑US} (3.4–3.1 L/100 km; 84–90 mpg_{‑imp}) fuel efficiency.

The LX models feature an automatic torque slave transmission and front disc and rear drum brakes.

Released in 2005, the LX is the Roman Numeral for 60, marking the sixtieth anniversary of the first Vespa scooter in 1946. The LXV, the V denoting a vintage style, was released the same year and is mechanically identical.

== Introduction ==
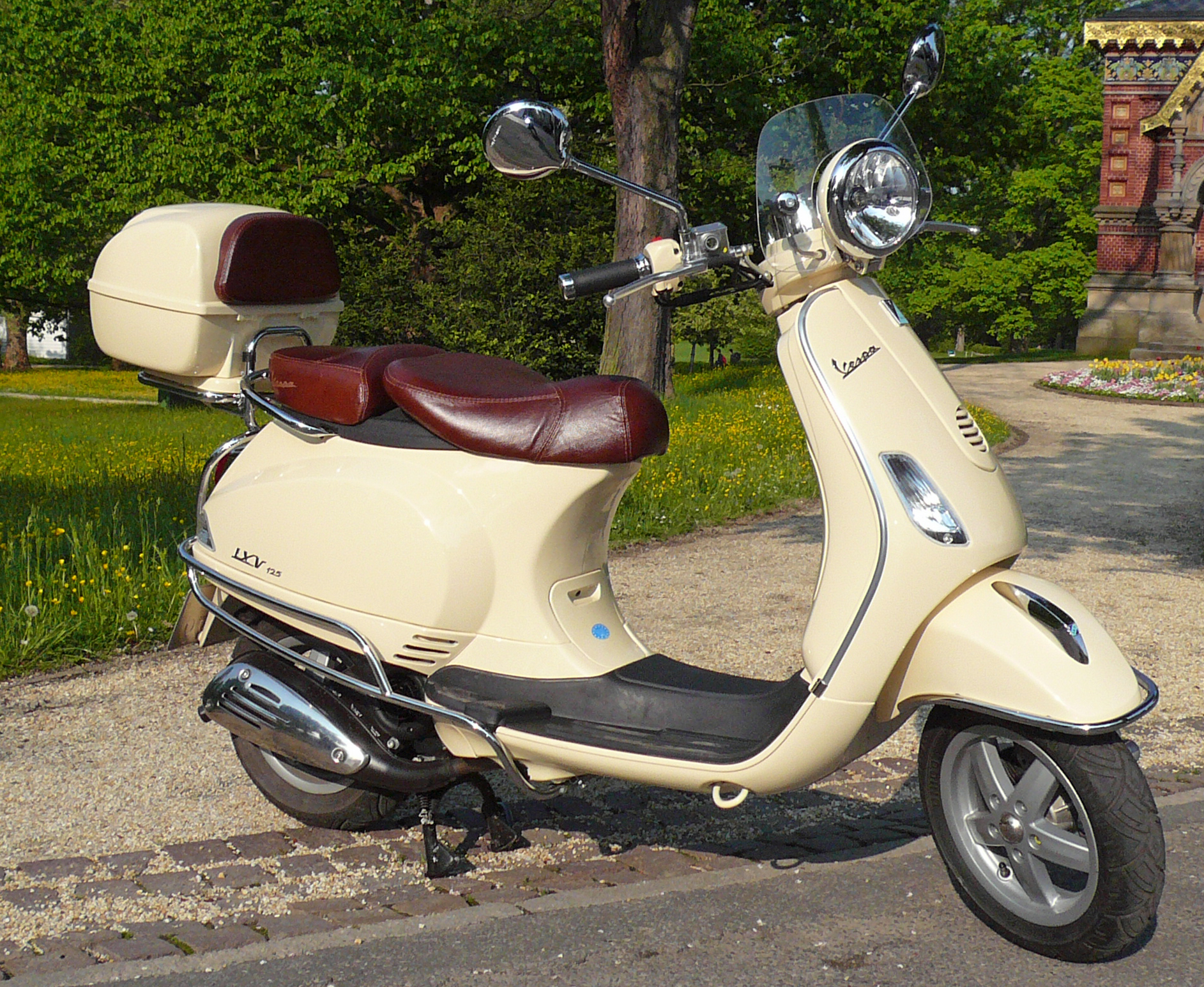
Vespa LXV 125

Presented in February 2005 as far as the exterior is concerned, the frame is more squared than the ET2/ET4 series it intended to replace.

In 2009 it was restyled where the crest on the front fender and some chrome on the edges of the knobs and on the horn grille were added. On the occasion of this restyling, the engines became injection.

The LX, like all other Vespa scooters, has a steel supporting body that also contains a 9.8-liter tank inside; it is combined with the typical single-arm suspension on the front wheel. At the rear it has a suspension with double-acting hydraulic single shock absorber. The wheels are in five-spoke light alloy and have a diameter of 11 "front and 10" rear. The front wheel has a disc brake installed, while the rear one keeps the classic drum. To improve braking performance, the front disc brake was made of stainless steel with a diameter of approximately 200 mm and was equipped with a caliper with two opposed pistons with hydraulic control. The gearbox, like all Vespa scooters from 1996 to today (except the PX model), is of the CVT type.

In June 2009, production also started in Vietnam at the Binh Xuyen Indus plant of the local subsidiary Piaggio Vietnam Ltd. These models are sold on Asian markets.

In January 2012, production of the Vespa LX also started in India for the local market; the Indian LX features 125 single-cylinder three-valve engine and numerous set-up changes to suit local customers. Production takes place in the Baramati plant of the Piaggio Vehicles Private branch.

== Vespa LX ==
The LX was made available in multiple displacements, 50, 125 and 150 cm^{3}. All engines are forced air cooled. The smaller displacement version is produced with both a two-stroke engine and a four-stroke engine with the latter being later enhanced with the addition of two more valves in the cylinder. The starting is electric or by means of a crank arm. The engines follow the Euro 2 directive. The maximum speed is limited to 45 km/h as per the rules governing mopeds; two-seater homologation as standard. To comply with the anti-emissions regulations, the catalyst system has been modified through the SAS secondary air recovery system. The 4-stroke Vespa 50 LX weighs 102 kg while the 2-stroke weighs just under the 4-stroke model (96 kg).

The 125 engine belongs to the Piaggio Leader family and is a four-stroke with electronic injection and has a power of 7.9 Kw (10.7 HP). With this engine, the LX reaches 91 km/h.

The highest displacement is represented by the Leader engine, also four-stroke and 151 cm^{3} electronic injection. This engine produces a power of 8.9 kW (12.1 hp) and the LX thus equipped reaches a top speed of 95 km/h.

In June 2012, the LX 125 and 150 models made their debut with three-valve timing and electronic injection.

The production of the LX ends in Italy in 2013 replaced by the new generation called Vespa Primavera.

== Vespa LX ==	LX 50 2T	LX 50 4T	LXV 50	LXV 50 Navy	LX 125	LXV 125	LXV 125 Navy	LX 50 FL 2T	LX 50 FL 4T 4V	LX 50 Touring 2T	LX 50 Touring 4T 4V	LX 125 FL ie	LXV 125 ie	LX 125 Touring	LX 150 FL ie	LX 150 Touring
Years in Production	2005-2009	2005-2009	2006-2008	2008	2005-2009	2006-2009	2008	2009-2014	2009-2014	2010-2014	2010-2014	2009-2014	2010-2014	2010-2014	2009-2014	2009-2014
Chassis Number Prefix	ZAPC3810-000001	ZAPC38300-000001	ZAPC38300-000001	-	ZAPM441-000001	ZAPM441										
Engine Type	Air-cooled, single-cylinder, two-stroke engine	Air-cooled, single-cylinder, Four-stroke engine	Air-cooled, single-cylinder, two-stroke engine	Air-cooled, single-cylinder, Four-stroke engine	Air-cooled, single-cylinder, Four-stroke engine	Air-cooled, single-cylinder, Four-stroke engine	Air-cooled, single-cylinder, Four-stroke engine	Air-cooled, single-cylinder, two-stroke engine	Air-cooled, single-cylinder, Four-stroke engine	Air-cooled, single-cylinder, two-stroke engine	Air-cooled, single-cylinder, Four-stroke engine	Air-cooled, single-cylinder, Four-stroke engine	Air-cooled, single-cylinder, Four-stroke engine	Air-cooled, single-cylinder, Four-stroke engine	Air-cooled, single-cylinder, Four-stroke engine	Air-cooled, single-cylinder, Four-stroke engine
Engine Capacity	49.4cc	49.9cc	49.4cc	49.9cc	124cc	124cc	124cc	49cc	49.9cc	49.9cc	49.9cc	124cc	124cc	124cc	151cc	151cc
Bore x Stroke (mm)	40 x 39.3mm	39 x 41.8mm	40 x 39.3mm	39 x 41.8mm	57 x 48.6mm	57 x 48.6mm	57 x 48.6mm	40 x 39.3mm	39 x 41.8mm	39 x 41.8mm	39 x 41.8mm	57 x 48.6mm	57 x 48.6mm	57 x 48.6mm	62.8 x 48.6mm	62.8 x 48.6mm
Power in kW (BHP)				4.3 bhp	10.3 hp @ 8000rpm	10.3 hp @ 8000rpm	7.9 hp @ 8250rpm		4.3 bhp		4.3 bhp	10.7 hp @ 8250rpm	10.7 hp @ 8250rpm	10.7 hp @ 8250rpm	12.9 hp @ 8000rpm	12.9 hp @ 8000rpm
Torque (Nm)					9.6 nm/6000rpm	9.6 nm/6000rpm	9.6 nm @ 6500rpm					9.6 nm @ 6500rpm	9.6 nm @ 6500rpm	9.6 nm @ 6500rpm	11.8 nm @ 6250rpm	11.8 nm @ 6250rpm
Transmission	Continuously variable automatic															
Top Speed	40 km/h	40 km/h	40 km/h	40 km/h	97 km/h	97 km/h	92 km/h	40 km/h	40 km/h	40 km/h	40 km/h	92 km/h	92 km/h	92 km/h	96 km/h	96 km/h
Price	€2,110	€2,310	€2,540	€2,300	€2,910	€3,210	€3,300	€2,500	€2,550	€2,450	€2,500	€3,350	€3,950	€3,600	€3,350	€3,600
Production																
Colours	Red,grey,black,violet	Red,grey,black,violet	Green, blue, white	Metallic blue	Red,grey,black,violet	Green,blue,white	Metallic blue	White,black,red,pink	White,black,red,pink	Metallic Brown	Metallic Brown	White,black,red,pink,light blue	Light green	Metallic Brown	White,black,red,pink	Metallic Brown
Weight	98 kg	96 kg	98 kg	98 kg	110 kg	110 kg	98 kg	98 kg	98 kg	98 kg	98 kg	98 kg	98 kg	98 kg	98 kg	98 kg
Fuel tank capacity	8.6 litres	9 litres	8.6 litres	8.5 litres	8.6 litres	8.6 litres	8.2 litres	8.5 litres	8.5 litres	8.5 litres	8.5 litres	8.2 litres	8.5 litres	8.5 litres	8.5 litres	8.5 litres

== Vespa S ==
The Vespa S was introduced on the market in 2007, after the official presentation held at the Milan Motor Show the previous year. It derives from the LX model, from which it stands out for numerous aesthetic details, such as the rectangular headlight, the minimalist mudguard with the chromed crest, the front bow tie, the squared rear-view mirrors, the red suspension spring and the back shield with the pouch instead of the classic glove box. Some of these details, such as the rectangular headlight and the squared mirrors, recall the aesthetics of the old "Vespa 50 Special" produced in the early seventies.

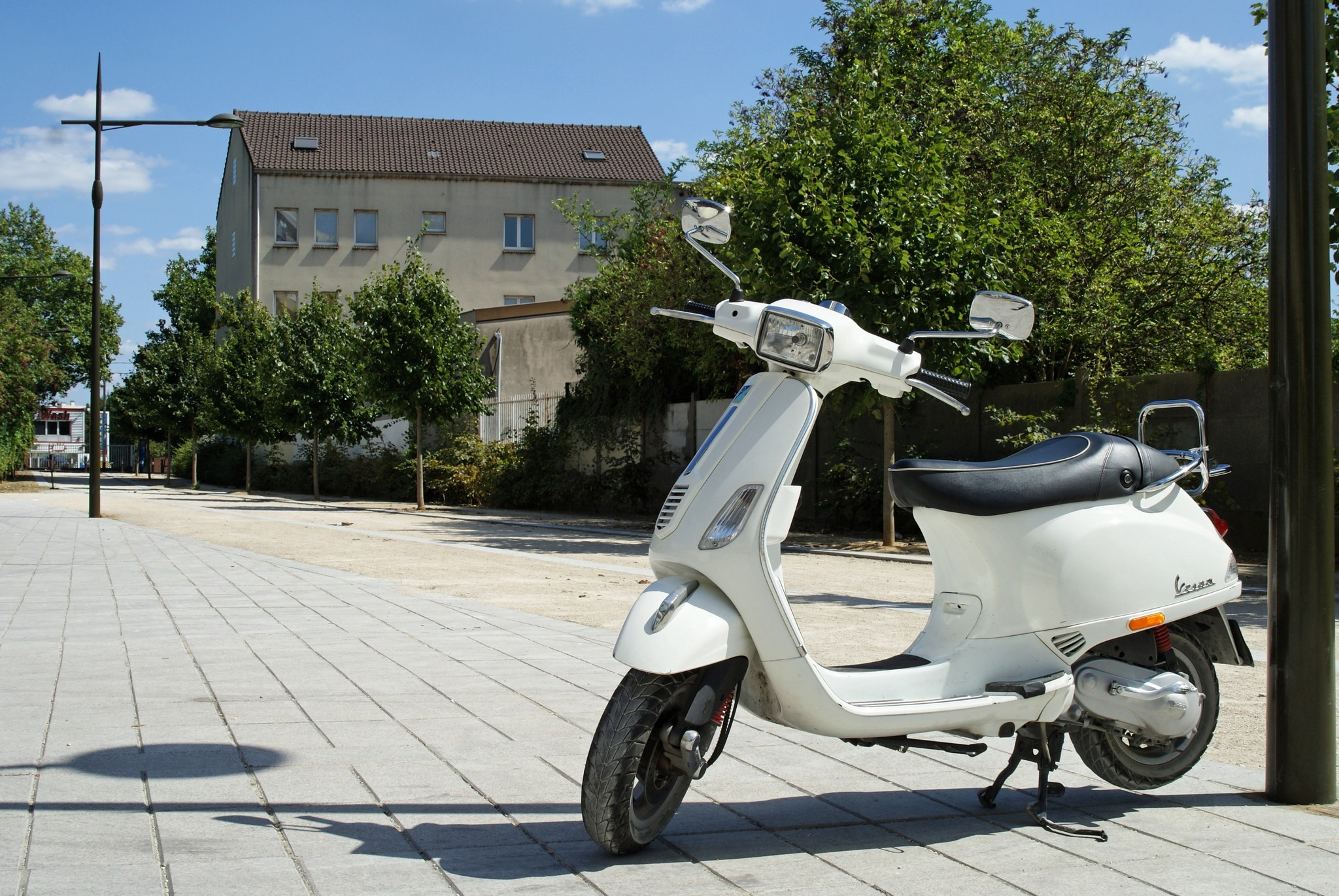
Vespa S

At the time of its launch in 2007, the Vespa S was only available in the 50 4-stroke and 125 versions which cost, respectively, 2,500 euros and 3,200 euros in Italy. The range of colors consisted of the Rosso Dragon, Nero Lucido, Montebianco and Orange Taormina shades, the latter subsequently replaced by the Azzurro Mediterraneo color.

The range was extended in 2008 to the 50 2-stroke and 150 versions. In 2009, however, the square-shaped chromed horn cover grille was introduced, while the range was updated with the 50 4V 4-stroke, 125ie and 150ie engines. In 2010 the special Vespa S College model made its debut, available in the 50 2-stroke version with the single-seater Sport saddle, as well as in the 125ie and 150ie versions with the two-seater Touring saddle. The special College version is recognizable by the presence of the transparent windshield and by the red or blue color of the footboard, leg shield, internal part of the handlebar, side graphics and saddle in eco-leather with white stitching, in contrast with the Montebianco color of the body.

A exclusive run of 200 individually numbered Taormina mandarino coloured Vespa Zafferano 50cc and 125cc were introduced in 2008 for the UK market

The Vespa S Sport was presented at the 2010 Milan Motor Show, available in the 50 2T, 50 4V, 125ie and 150ie versions and recognizable by the Titanium Gray bodywork, combined with the light gray side graphics and alloy wheels of matt black color. This special version was introduced on the market the following year and was confirmed also for 2012, with the range of colors extended to the Nero Abisso color combined with the saddle equipped with heat-sealed and white piping.

In 2012, the new 125ie and 150ie 3-valve engines made their debut, while the aesthetics were mainly renewed with the black finish for the horn cover and the fender crest, instead of the previous chrome. The graphics of the instrumentation and the shape of the front tie have also been updated. Finally, the standard equipment has been extended to include black 5-spoke alloy wheels and the central footboard with the Vespa logo has been introduced.

Production of the Vespa S ended at the end of 2013, replaced the following year by the Vespa Sprint.

== Vespa S ==	50 S 2t	50 S 4t 4v	125 S	125 S College	125 S ie	150 S	150 S ie
Years in Production	2007-2010	2008-2014	2007-2009	2010-2014	2009-2014	2008-2009	2009-2014
Chassis Number Prefix							
Engine Type	Air-cooled, single-cylinder, two-stroke engine	Air-cooled, single-cylinder, four-stroke engine	Air-cooled, single-cylinder, four-stroke engine	Air-cooled, single-cylinder, four-stroke engine	Air-cooled, single-cylinder, four-stroke engine	Air-cooled, single-cylinder, four-stroke engine	Air-cooled, single-cylinder, four-stroke engine
Engine Capacity	49.4cc	49.4cc	124cc	124cc	124cc	151cc	151cc
Bore x Stroke (mm)	40 x 39.3mm	40 x 39.3mm	57 x 48.6mm	57 x 48.6mm	57 x 48.6mm	62.8 x 48.6	62.8 x 48.6
Power in kW (BHP)		4.3 hp	10.7 hp@8000rpm	10.7 hp@8000rpm	10.7 hp@8000rpm	12.9 hp@8000rpm	12.9 hp@8000rpm
Torque (Nm)			12 nm @6000 rpm	12 nm @6000 rpm	12 nm @6000 rpm	11 nm @6250 rpm	11 nm @6250 rpm
Transmission	Continuously variable automatic						
Top Speed	40 km/h	40 km/h	92 km/h	92 km/h	92 km/h	96 km/h	96 km/h
Price	€2,250	€2,750	€3,500	€3,800	€3,550	€3,650	€3,700
Production							
Colours	White, black, orange, red	White, black, orange	White, black, orange	White-red	White, black, orange	White, black, red	White, black, red
Weight	98 kg	98 kg	98 kg	98 kg	98 kg	98 kg	98 kg
Fuel tank capacity	8.5 litres	8.5 litres	8.5 litres	8.5 litres	8.5 litres	8.5 litres	8.5 litres
