= Isuzu D-Max =

Pickup truck

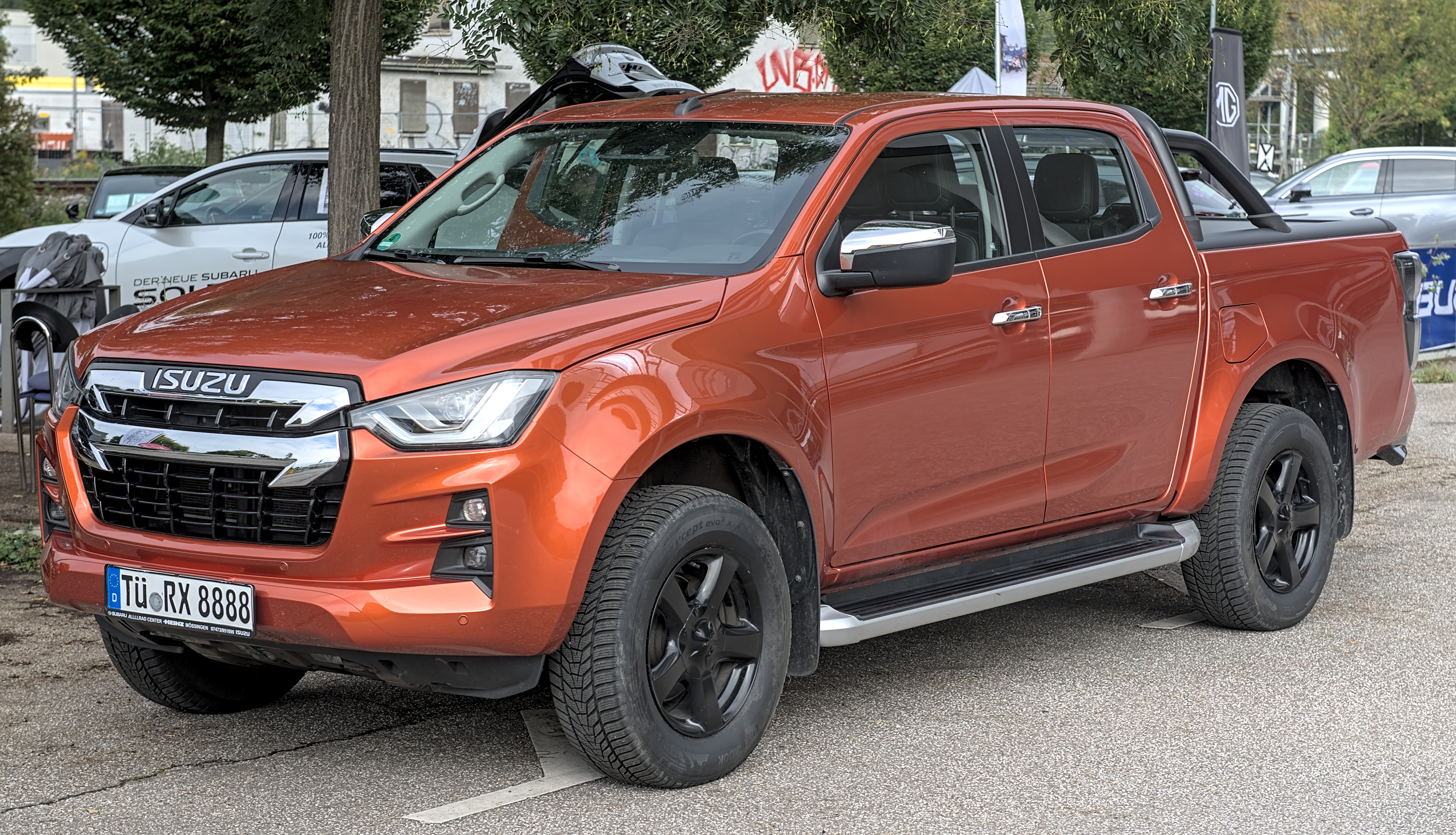

Overview
- Manufacturer: Isuzu
- Production: 2002–present

Body and chassis
- Class: Compact pickup truck (2002–2011); Mid-size pickup truck (2011–present)
- Body style: 2-door chassis cab; 2-door pickup truck; 4-door chassis cab; 4-door pickup truck
- Layout: Front-engine, rear-wheel drive; Front-engine, four-wheel drive

Chronology
- Predecessor: Isuzu Faster
- Successor: Chevrolet Colorado (for Chevrolet D-Max); Chevrolet S10 Max (for Chevrolet D-Max)

The Isuzu D-Max is a compact pickup truck (first- and second-generation) and mid-size pickup truck (third generation) manufactured since 2002 by Isuzu. It is a successor to the Isuzu Faster/KB. The first and second-generation model shares its platform with the Chevrolet Colorado. The third-generation model shares its platform with the third-generation Mazda BT-50, which is produced in the same Isuzu plant in Thailand.

In Australasia the D-Max was marketed as the Holden Rodeo from 2003 to 2008, when it was relaunched as the Holden Colorado. The Isuzu D-Max itself was also introduced during 2008, selling alongside the Holden-badged offering.

The D-Max also has an SUV counterpart based on the same platform, which is the MU-7 for the first-generation model, and the MU-X for the succeeding generations.

== First generation (RA, RC; 2002) ==
First generation
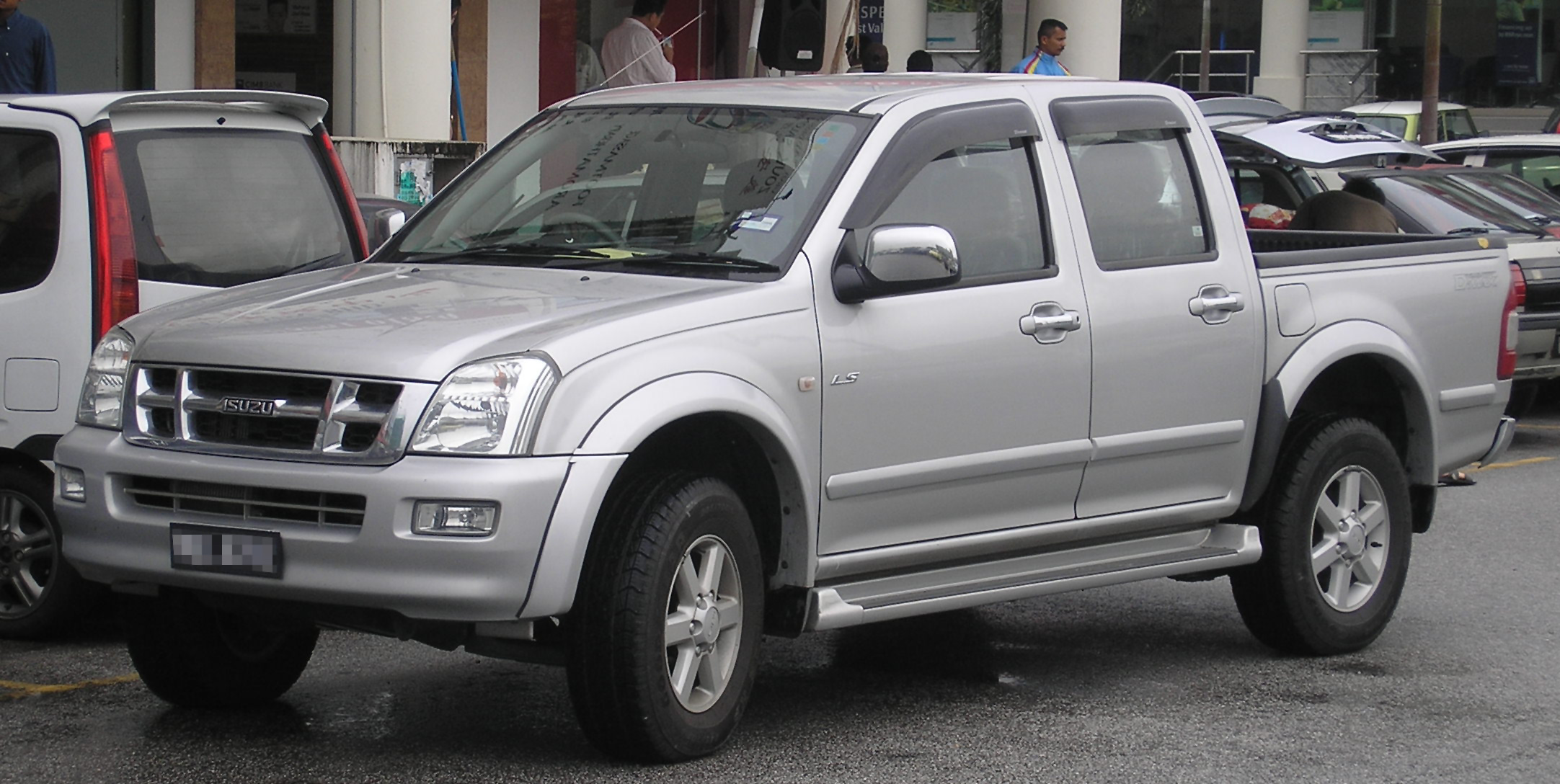

Overview
- Model code: RA/RC
- Also called: Chevrolet D-Max; Chevrolet LUV D-Max; Chevrolet T-Series; Holden Rodeo; Isuzu KB; Isuzu LB; Isuzu Rodeo; Isuzu Dvo
- Production: 2002–2012; 2003–present (China)
- Assembly: Chile: Arica (until 2008); China: Baoding, Hebei (Great Wall), Foshan, Guangdong (Foday); Ecuador: Quito; Egypt: 6th of October City; Nigeria: Lagos (GMNL); Philippines: Biñan, Laguna (IPC); Portugal: Vendas Novas; South Africa: Port Elizabeth (GMSA); Sandton (ITSA); Thailand: Samut Prakan (Isuzu Motors Thailand); Rayong (GM Thailand); Tunisia: Kairouan (IMM); Malaysia: Pekan, Pahang (Isuzu HICOM Malaysia)

Body and chassis
- Related: Chevrolet Colorado/Isuzu i-Series; Isuzu MU-7

Powertrain
- Engine: Petrol: 3.5 L 6VE1 DOHC V6 (Chevrolet LUV D-MAX); Diesel: 2.5 L 4JA1-T I4 (2002–2005); 2.5 L 4JK1-TC / TCX I4 (2005–2011); 3.0 L 4JH1-T I4 (2002–2004); 3.0 L 4JJ1-TC I4 (2004–2011); 3.0 L 4JJ1-TCX I4 (2006–2011); China (petrol): 2.0 L 4G63 I4 (Foday Explorer); 2.2 L 491Q-ME I4 (Foday Lion, Explorer); 2.2 L GW491QE I4 (Great Wall Pegasus, Socool); 2.4 L 4G69 I4 (Foday Lion); China (diesel): 1.9 L D19TCID1 turbo I4 (Foday Lion); 2.8 L BJ493ZQV1 turbo I4 (Foday Explorer); 2.8 L 4B28TC/4D28TC I4 (Foday Lion); 2.8 L GW2.8TC I4 (Foday Lion, Explorer)
- Transmission: 5-speed MU-Series manual 4-speed MaxMatic automatic

Dimensions
- Curb weight: 1,650–1,855 kg (3,638–4,090 lb)

=== Markets ===
==== Thailand ====
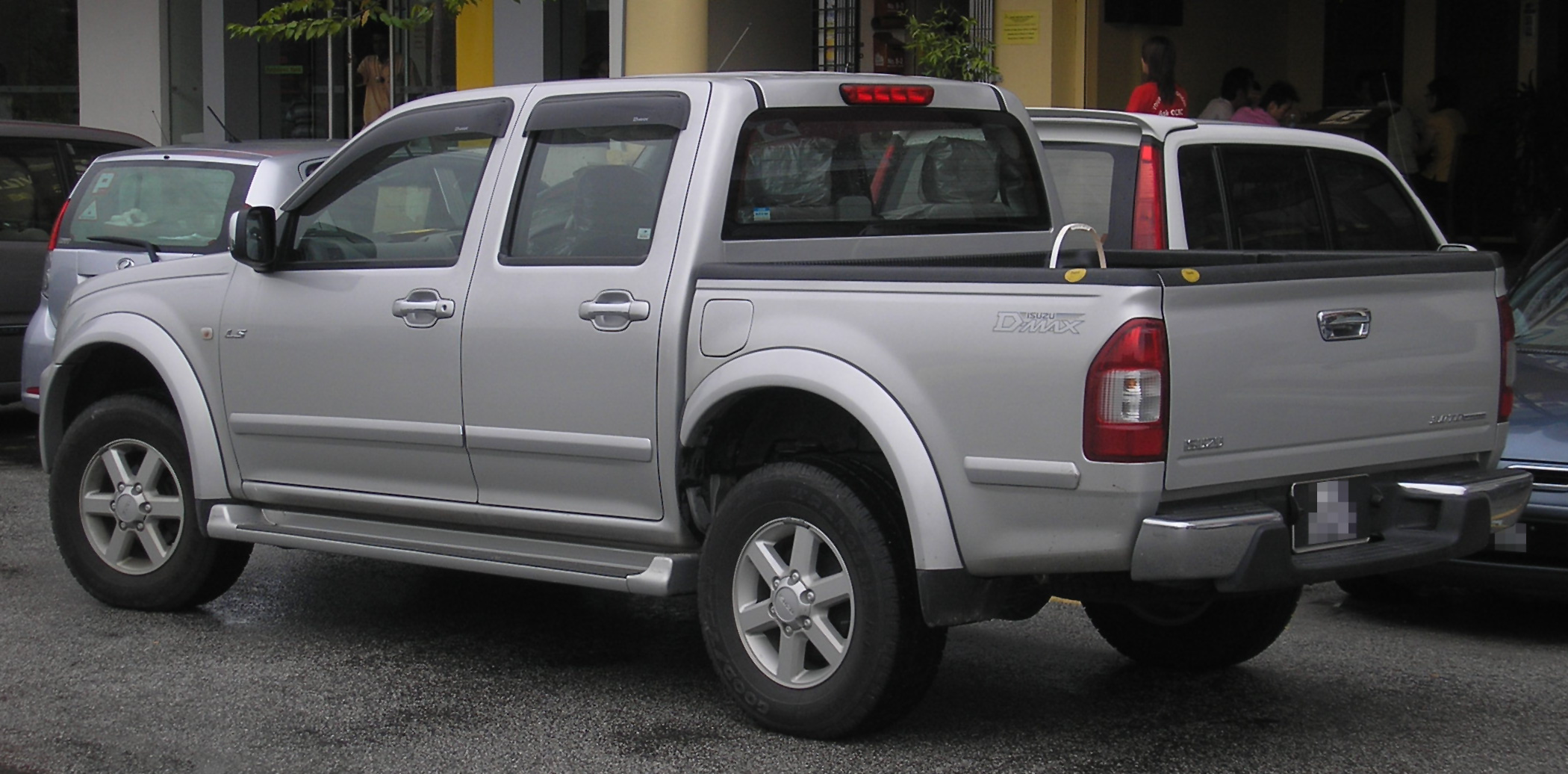
Rear (Malaysia, pre-facelift)

The D-Max pickup truck received its 2002 world premiere in Thailand. This location was chosen because GM-Isuzu had recently decided to close their small truck assembly plant in Japan and move their joint operation to Thailand. The D-Max was available in various models. The Spark (single cab) (EX) was available only as a 4x2, with three configurations between cab chassis, long bed with power steering and without. SpaceCabs (extended cab), and Cab4s (double cab) can be divided into two major configurations: standard height 4x2s (SL, SX, SLX), and 4x4s (S and LS) with the "Rodeo" name instead of SpaceCab. Crew cabs were all sold with the same Cab4 name (Cab4 models became available late in last quarter). All are built and sold alongside the almost identical Chevrolet Colorado which had debuted in the late first quarter of 2004.

Engine choices for that year until the end of third quarter of 2004 derived from its direct predecessor: 4JH1-T 3.0 and 4JA1-T 2.5.

Hi-Lander 3.0 (lifted 4x2), the trim style became available in late 2003, and ground clearance equals that of the 4x4 models. There were only two cab styles to choose between. This makes Isuzu the third manufacturer in Thailand to begin selling lifted 4x2 pickups (after Toyota and Ford).

In October 2004, Isuzu introduced the DDi iTEQ common-rail diesel engine family for the D-Max. The first engine to appear was the 3.0 4JJ1-TC 146 PS (107 kW; 144 hp). Every models also received a mid-cycle refresh with a new front bumper that incorporated an "instant spoiler" underneath. Additionally, new MUA-5H five-speed manual transmission was also introduced.

During the first quarter of 2005, a 2.5 4JK1-TC 116 PS (85 kW; 114 hp), the second DDi iTEQ engine, was introduced and offered as an economical choice to replace its aging predecessor (4JA1-T was concurrently available for that year only). 4x4 models and Hi-Lander's suspensions were raised up 25 millimeters extra.

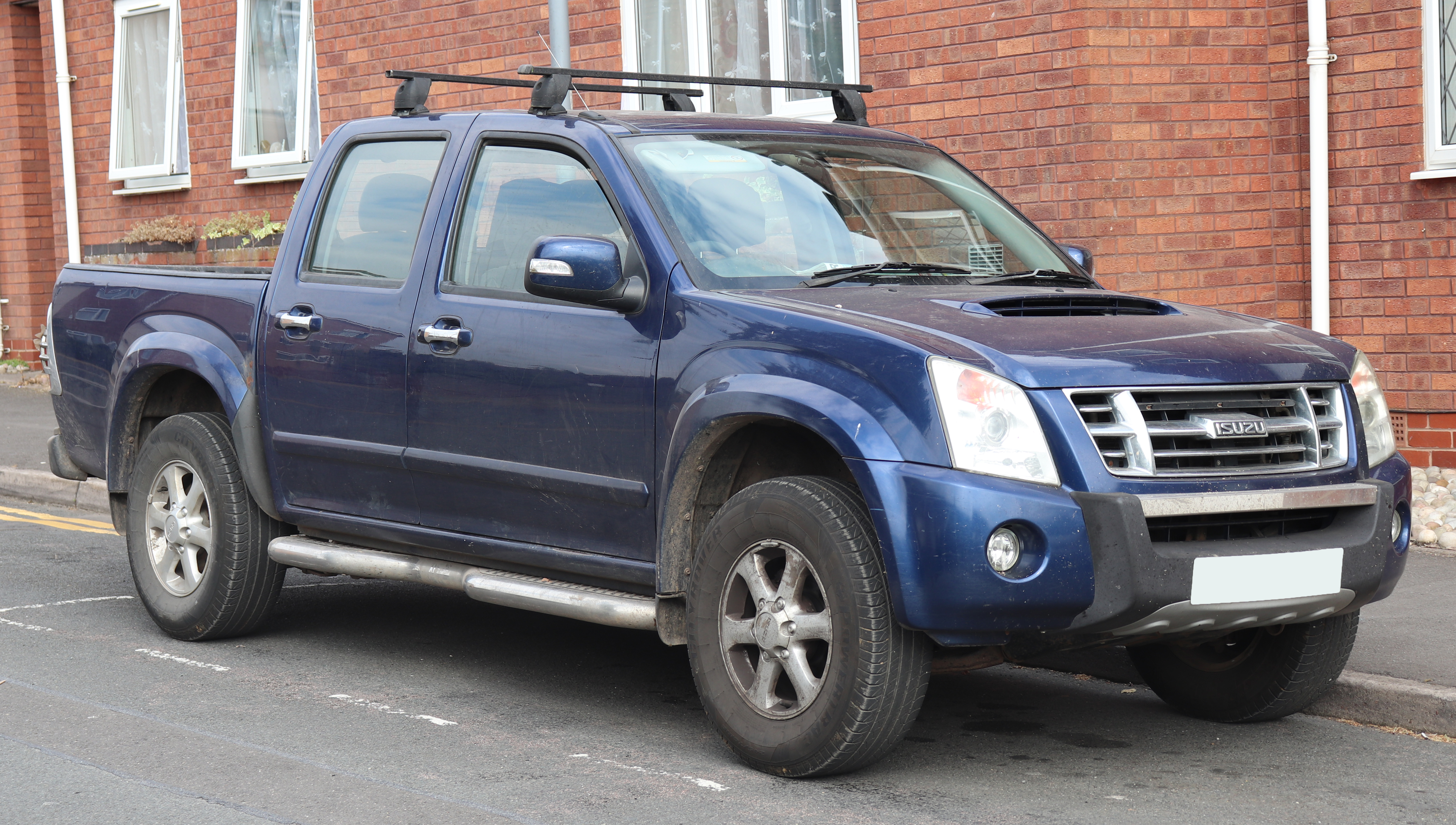
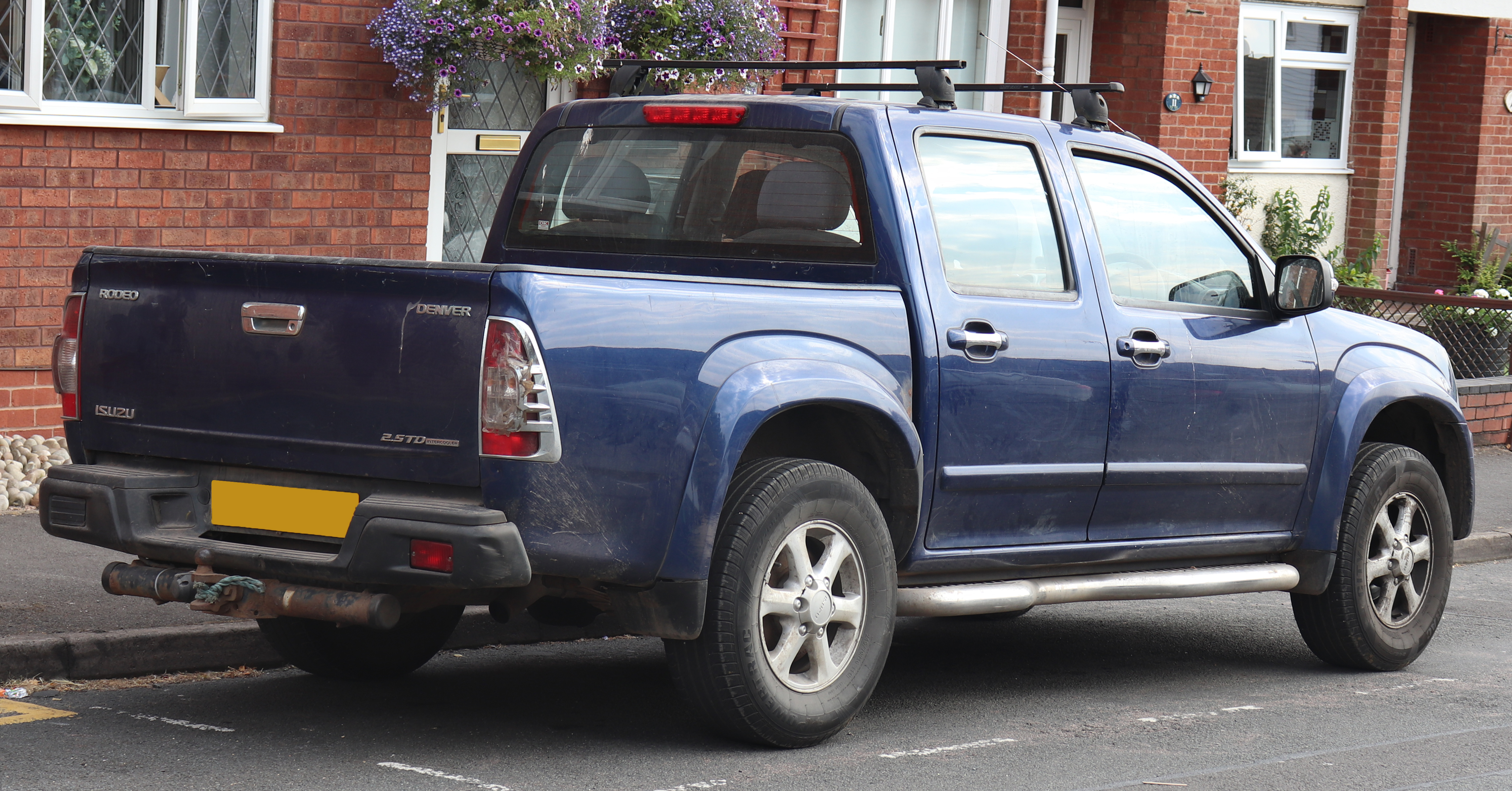
Facelift (United Kingdom)

In the third quarter of 2006, the D-Max received a major facelift and the introduction of a third DDi iTEQ engine, 3.0 4JJ1-TCX. This engine is a modified 4JJ1-TC, incorporating a new Variable Valve Geometry Turbo (VGS). The extra power warranted an introduction of new transmissions as well: the MUX 5-Speed manual and MaxMatic-III automatic transmission. All models equipped with Xenon headlamps were changed to projector headlamps instead. Also introduced was the new "Hexapod-plot" interior. Other DDi iTEQ engines were also tweaked a bit for extra power and efficiency.

In 2007, Isuzu celebrated its 50th anniversary in Thailand with "Gold Series" models sold for the 2008 model year. The Hi-Lander Cab4 model with the VGS turbodiesel engine became available for the first time. The 4x4 models get a new front bumper design with chrome accents. Also added was the choice of a 2.5l 4-cylinder engine in LS 4x4 and Hi-Lander models.

During the middle of the first quarter of 2008, the Rodeo LS and Hi-Lander SpaceCab were also fitted with the 3.0-litre VGS Turbodiesel engine to fill all the remaining gaps in the lineup.

In the early fourth quarter of 2008, Isuzu introduced D-Max Platinum models for 2009 to replace the outgoing Gold Series. LS 4x4 and Hi-Lander received a new front grille design; chrome on the LS 4x4 trim and semi platinum-silver on the Hi-Lander trim. Minor-modified headlamps and new fog lamps for a platinum look. 4x2 SLX and SX derived fascias from 4x4/Hi-Lander (before Platinum's fascia). Chrome fascia for 3.0 SLX models and colour-keyed fascia for SX. Top heads of 3 DDi iTEQ engines changed from gold to platinum. Some models dropped the 4JJ1-TC 3.0l engine. All retooled to be acceptable with Biodiesel B5. All SpaceCab models featured new middle pillars called Safety Pillar Cab; pillars and door beam larger and thicker. Not all Cab4 models received retooled rear suspension called Super Flex Plus suspension. Spark EX also received new gauge and indicator. D-Max Platinum models commenced on sale from 15 October.

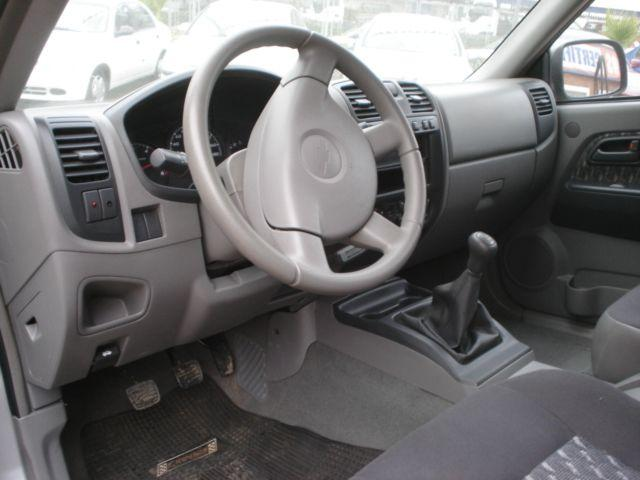
Interior (Chevrolet rebadged)

In the middle of September 2009, Isuzu introduced the D-Max Super Platinum models. SL model was dropped. Highline SLX 4x2 models received same fascia and front bumper as Hi-Lander / LS 4x4 style, new 16" wheels and newer styles of alloy wheels for SLX / Hi-Lander / LS 4x4, newer rear bumper, and new "Super Platinum" marque at the tailgate. LS 4x4 models received skid plate attached under the bumper in brighter silver, newer sidestep. Highline Hi-Lander / LS 4x4 models have newer style blind spot rear view mirrors, and new short-plot antenna.

Every year since late 2005 until now, there are several special D-Max & MU-7 models. Available exclusively only for a period during Thailand's 2 largest auto shows and also other Isuzu occasions and they were all unique. D-Max Smart models are one special model set. Available in several occasions during 2008. This edition modifies SpaceCab 4x2 2.5 by special white pearl exterior colour and optional equipment such as immobilizer key.

Ever since Platinum models introduced, D-Max Smart models expanded up to 3 choices: SpaceCab 4x2, Cab4 4x2, and Hi-Lander 2-Door. These 3 models also updated as new Super Platinum models.

In 2009, a sport version of the D-Max named the X-Series was introduced, aimed especially for a target group of young people normally not interested in using pickup trucks. It was marketed as a "Lifestyle Pickup" and equipped with additional skirts and prominent red Isuzu letters at front grille. The wheels remain unchanged from the normal model but came with gunmetal paint finish. Available in two-door SpaceCab and four-door Cab4 body variants with a manual transmission.

In 2010, D-Max and MU-7 Super Titanium models were introduced. It featured a frontal camera, usually found in luxury cars, first time ever in a Thai pickup, and are the last model in this generation.

==== Malaysia ====
The first generation Isuzu D-Max was launched in June 2005. In the year 2007, Isuzu Malaysia has revealed the latest facelift of its Isuzu D-Max double cab pick-up truck, which has a few improvements in terms of the 3.0-litre engine which has more power and 19% more fuel efficiency than the pre-facelift version. Another new facelift was launched in 2009 and minor updates occurring in July 2011. The limited edition has been launched for the first generation Isuzu D-Max in Malaysia. The limited-edition is the "Hi-Def" from September 2008, the new limited edition "Hi-Def" launched from June 2012 limited to 210 units.

==== Australasia ====
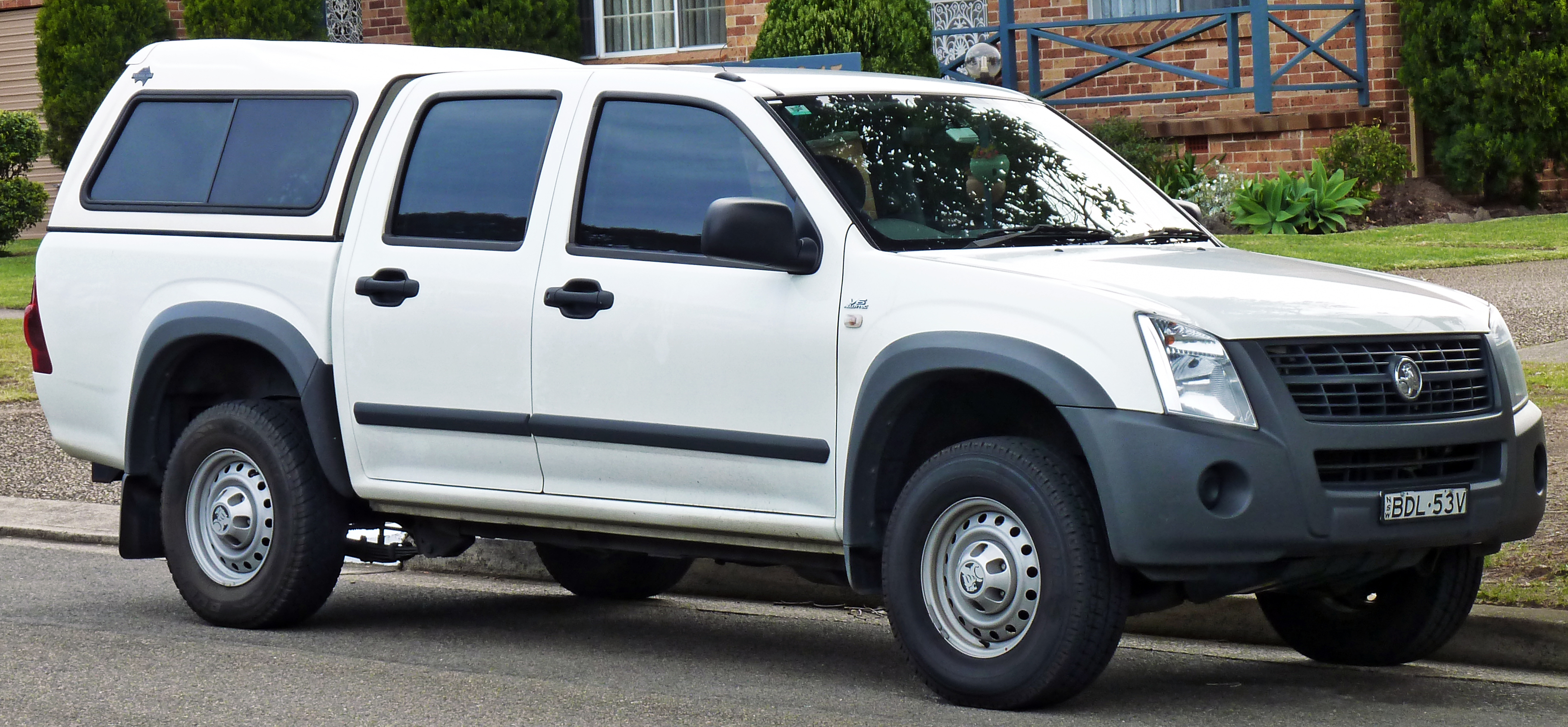
Holden Rodeo

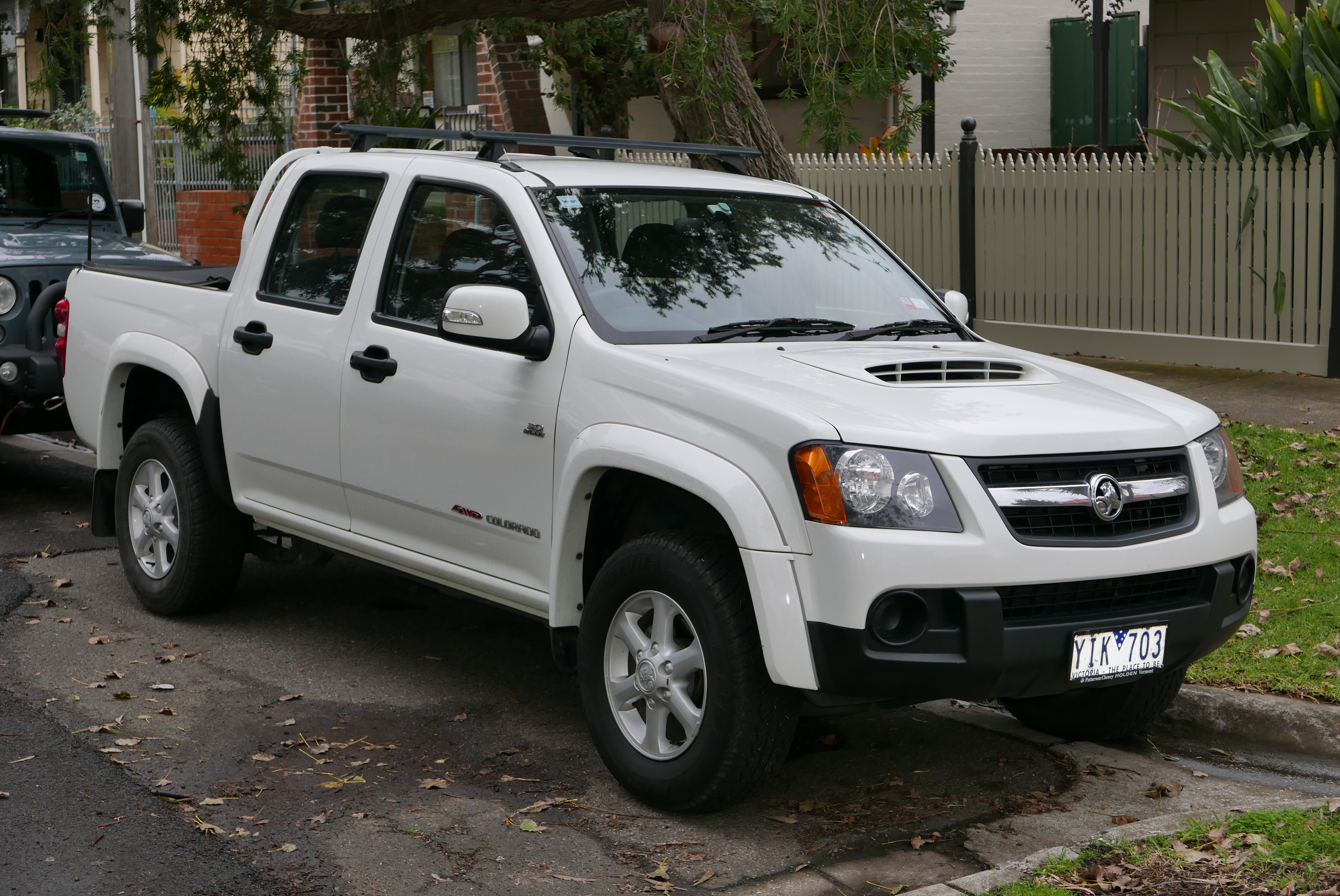
Holden Colorado

In Australia and New Zealand, the D-Max was sold as the third-generation Holden Rodeo (RA) between 2003 and 2008, before being facelifted into the form of the Holden Colorado. This was a result of the GM-Isuzu split resulting in GM losing the right to use the "Rodeo" name. As with Rodeo, the Colorado is available as either two- or four-wheel drive and in a range of body styles including single cab, space cab and crew cab. Power is provided by a range of petrol and diesel engines. Of the petrol engines, Holden offered a 2.4-litre four-cylinder as well as the Australian-made 3.6-litre Alloytec engine. The diesel powerplant is a four-cylinder Isuzu 4JJ1 unit displacing 3.0 litres. The main difference between the Colorado and the Rodeo is the revised bodywork from the A-pillar forward.

In October 2008, the Isuzu D-Max was launched in Australia, alongside the almost identical Holden Colorado. Officially available in Australia as its own brand under the marketing name Isuzu UTE Australia, separate to the medium-heavy truck manufacturer, Isuzu Australia.

In June 2012, the RC series Holden Colorado was replaced by the RG model.

Holden Colorado powertrains
Engine	Power	Torque	Transmission
2.4 L inline-four	92 kW (123 hp)	207 N⋅m (153 lb⋅ft)	5-speed manual
3.6 L Alloytec V6	157 kW (211 hp)	313 N⋅m (231 lb⋅ft)	4-speed automatic 5-speed manual
3.0 L inline-four (turbo-diesel)	120 kW (161 hp)	360 N⋅m (266 lbf⋅ft) (manual)	4-speed automatic 5-speed manual
2.8 L inline-four (turbo-diesel) (Up to Dec 2013)	132 kW (177 hp)	440 N⋅m (325 lbf⋅ft) (manual); 470 N⋅m (347 lbf⋅ft) (automatic)	6-speed automatic 5-speed manual
2.8 L inline-four (turbo-diesel) (Dec 2013 onwards)	147 kW (197 hp)	440 N⋅m (325 lbf⋅ft) (manual); 500 N⋅m (369 lbf⋅ft) (automatic)	6-speed automatic 6-speed manual

==== New Zealand ====
In June 2010, Isuzu Utes New Zealand became the official distributor for Isuzu D-Max in New Zealand.

==== Europe ====
In the United Kingdom, Isuzu UK is the official distributor for the Isuzu D-Max in summer 2012.

==== South America ====
Chevrolet D-Max

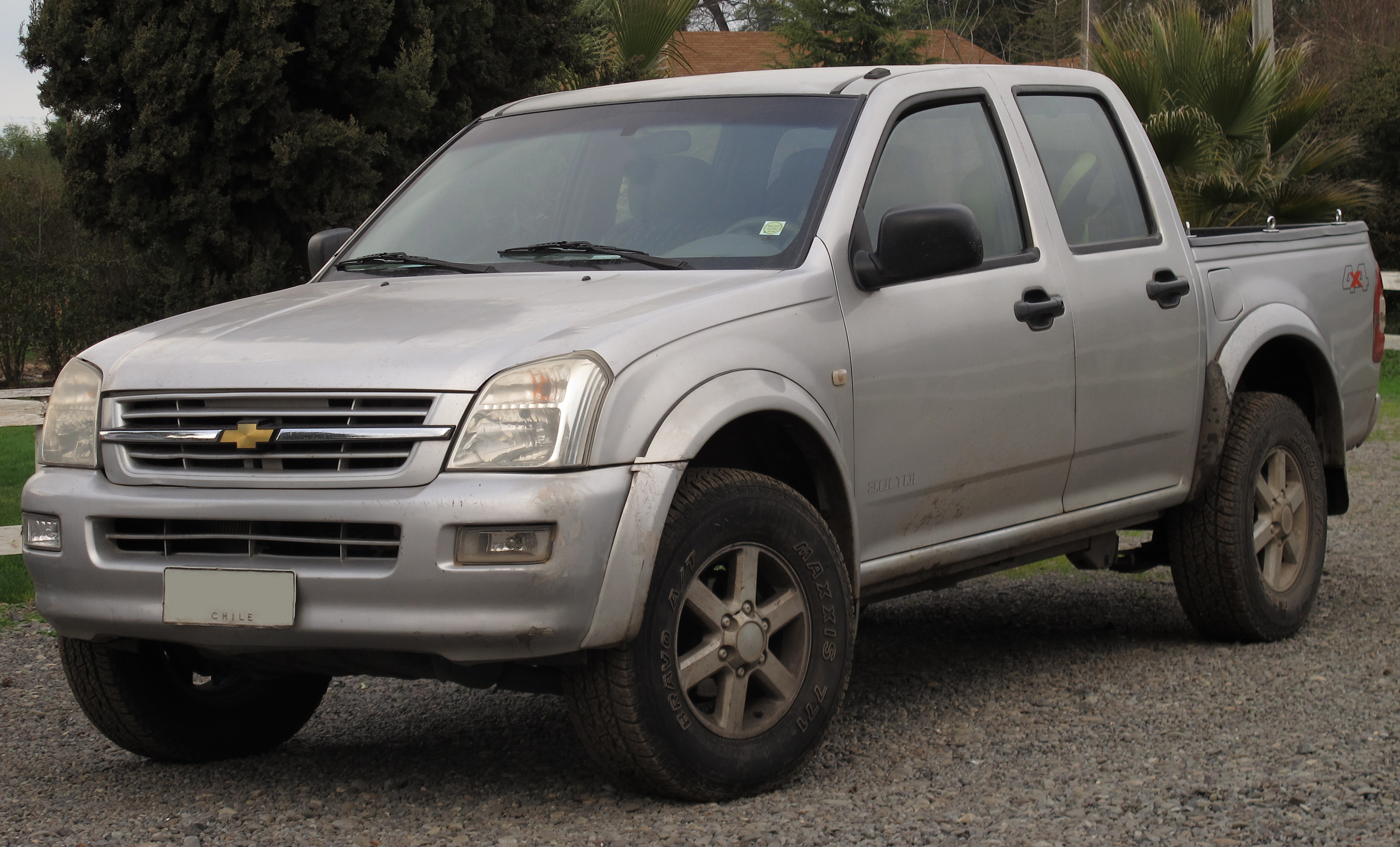
Pre-facelift

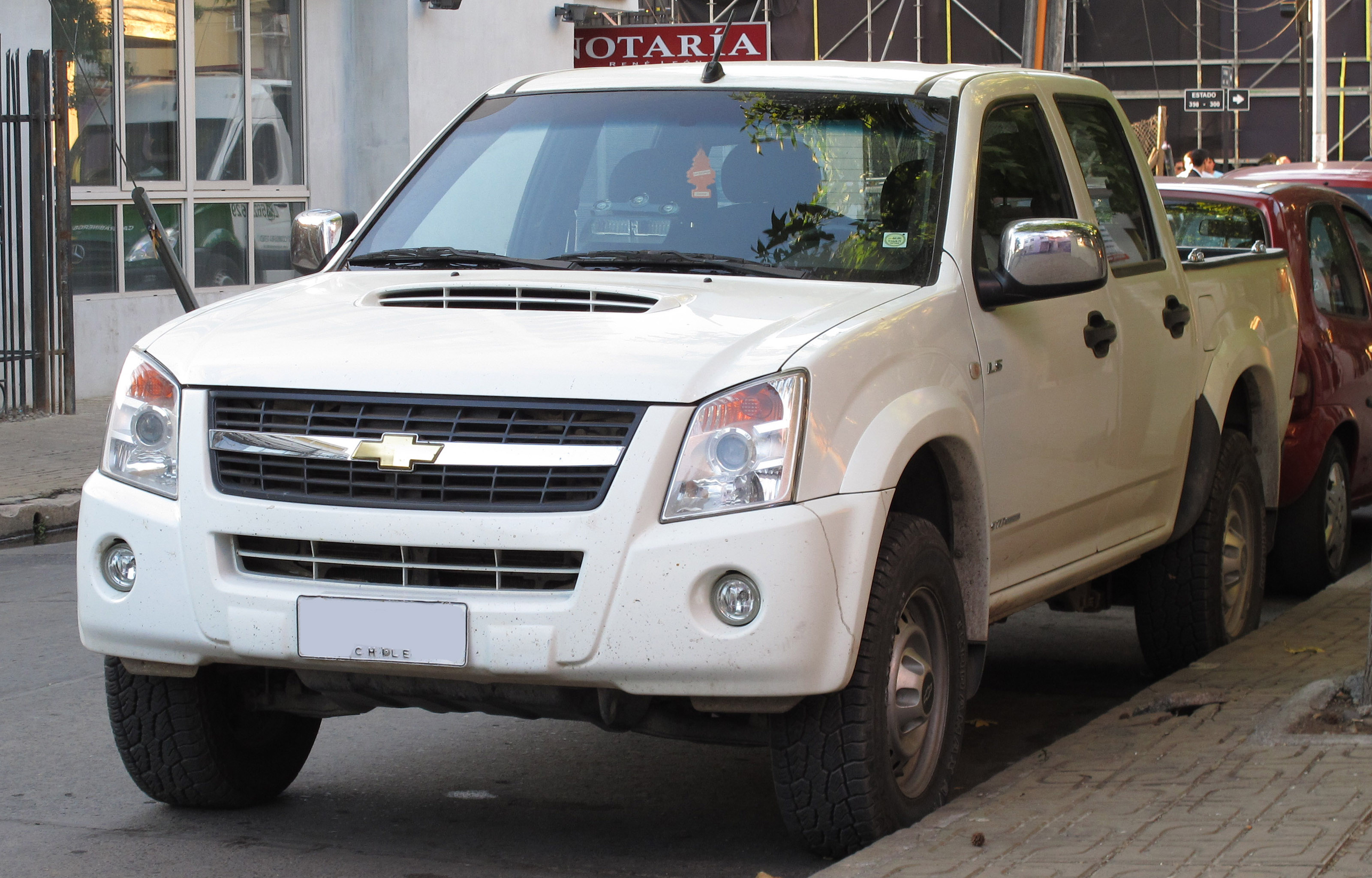
Facelift

Julie Beamer, director of GM Chile, announced on 5 March 2008 to workers of the only remaining automobile factory in Chile, that said factory would be closed down on 31 July that year. The only vehicle that was in production at the time was the Chevrolet LUV. The announcement came shortly after then-president of Venezuela Hugo Chávez reduced the import quota for cars in Venezuela, the main export market for the Chilean-made Chevrolet LUV, but GM Chile said in its official statement that the reason behind the end of production in Arica was the lack of favorable conditions for vehicle manufacturing in Chile and fierce competition from many other car manufacturers and countries on Chile's car market.

=== Safety ===
ANCAP test results* Isuzu D-Max 4x2 single cab chassis (2008)
Test	Score
Overall	3 /5 stars
Frontal offset	7.51/16
Side impact	16/16
Pole	Not Assessed
Seat belt reminders	0/3
Whiplash protection	Not Assessed
Pedestrian protection	Not Assessed
Electronic stability control	Not Available

ANCAP test results* Isuzu D-Max 4x4 dual cab 3.0L diesel with dual frontal airbags (2008)
Test	Score
Overall	3 /5 stars
Frontal offset	5.40/16
Side impact	16/16
Pole	Not Assessed
Seat belt reminders	0/3
Whiplash protection	Not Assessed
Pedestrian protection	Poor
Electronic stability control	Not Available

== Second generation (RT; 2011) ==
Second generation
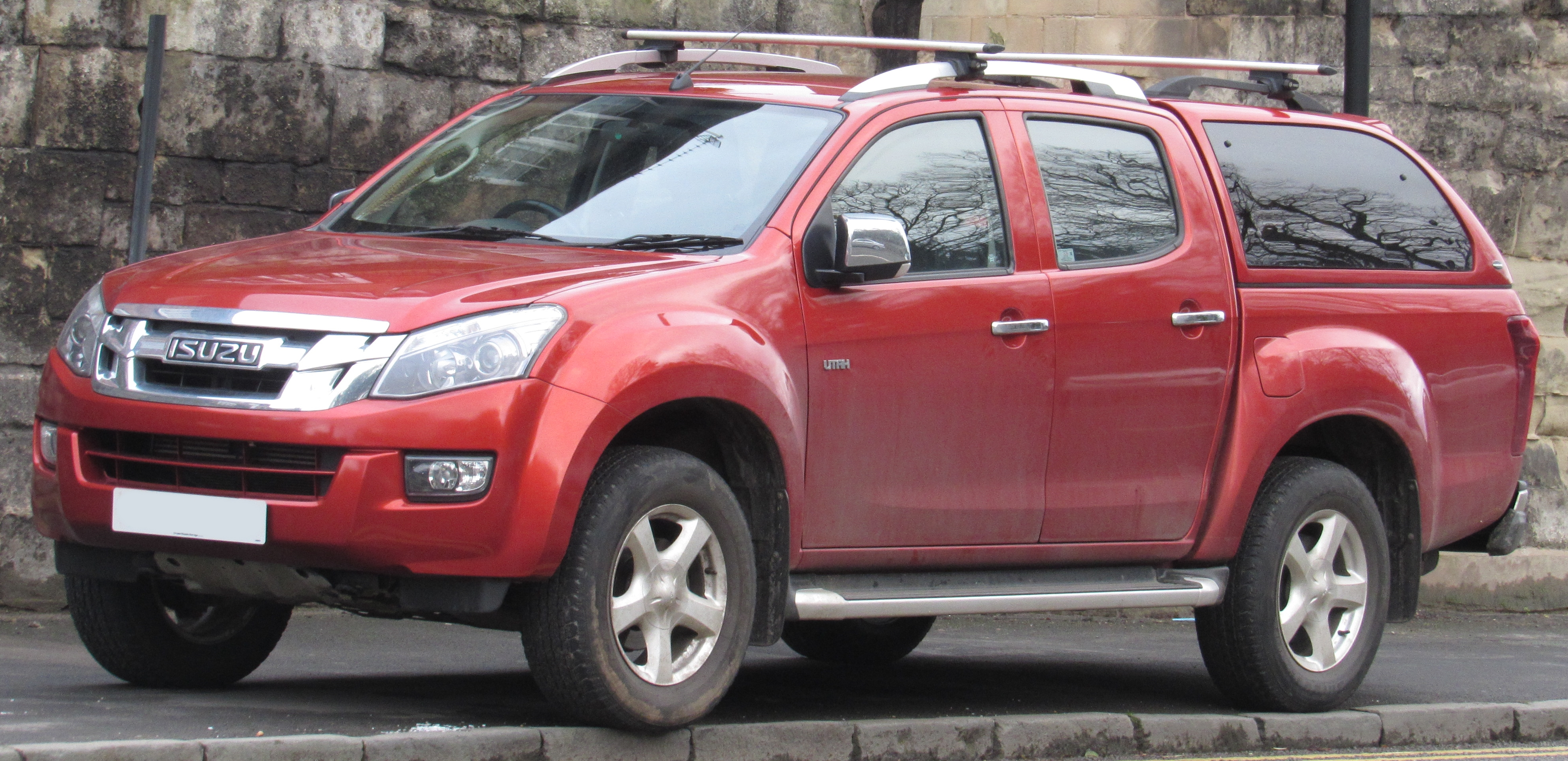

Overview
- Model code: RT50/85
- Also called: Isuzu KB; Chevrolet D-Max; Chevrolet T-Series; JIM Ruimai (Remax); JIM Ruimai S (Remax S)
- Production: 2011–present
- Assembly: Thailand: Samut Prakan (Isuzu Motors Thailand); Malaysia: Pekan, Pahang (Isuzu Malaysia); Philippines: Biñan, Laguna (Isuzu Philippines, 2013–2019); South Africa: Port Elizabeth; Turkey: Çayırova, Kocaeli (Anadolu Isuzu, since 2014); China: Jiangxi (Jiangxi Isuzu); India: Sri City (Isuzu Motors India, since 2016); Pakistan: Karachi (Ghandhara Industries Limited); Uzbekistan: Samarkand (SamAuto, since 2019); Ecuador: Quito (GM OBB); Egypt: 6th of October City (GM Egypt)

Body and chassis
- Body style: 2-door single cab; 4-door extended cab with rear clamshell doors; 4-door double cab
- Platform: Isuzu Gravity Responsive Intelligent Platform (i-GRIP)
- Related: Isuzu MU-X (RF); Chevrolet Colorado (RG); Chevrolet Trailblazer; Qingling Taga

Powertrain
- Engine: Petrol: 2.4 L Vortec 2400 I4; Diesel: 1.9 L RZ4E-TC I4 (2015–present); 2.5 L 4JK1-TC / TCX I4; 2.5 L twin-turbo I4 (Europe); 3.0 L 4JJ1-TCX I4
- Transmission: 5-speed manual; 6-speed manual; 5-speed Rev-Tronic AW TB50-LS automatic; 6-speed Rev-Tronic AW TB60-LS automatic

Dimensions
- Wheelbase: 3,095 mm (121.9 in)
- Length: 5,215 mm (205.3 in) (single cab); 5,295 mm (208.5 in) (double cab)
- Width: 1,775–1,860 mm (69.9–73.2 in)
- Height: 1,690–1,785 mm (66.5–70.3 in)

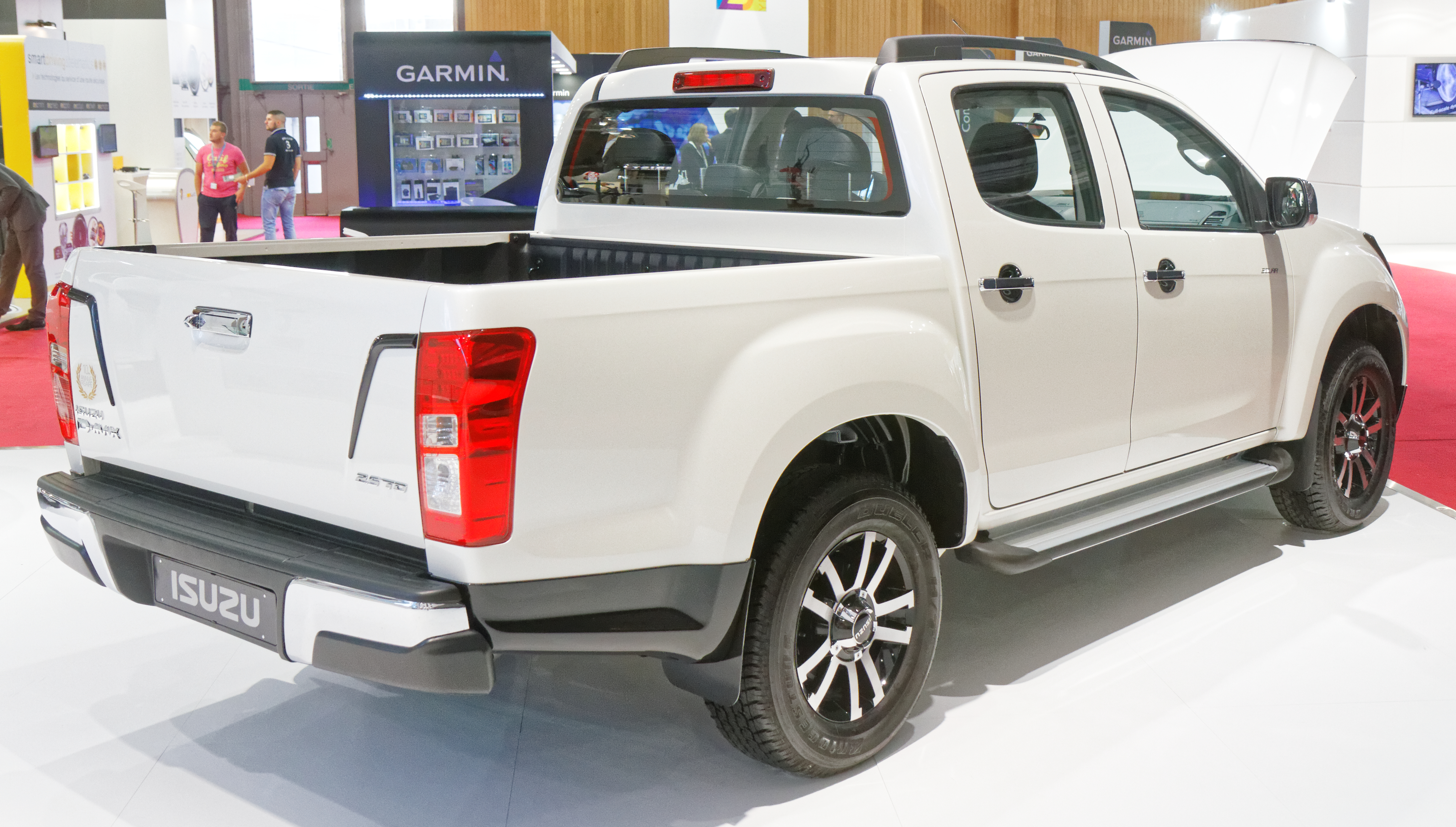
Dual-cab utility (rear)

In 2011, the Japanese automaker revealed the second-generation D-Max, which was designed in cooperation with General Motors and is a sister model to the second-generation Chevrolet Colorado. As with previous models, the D-Max shares its ladder chassis platform, body construction, mechanical componentry and interior design (dash, centre stack, steering wheel and doors) with the Colorado. The model features different front and rear end styling treatments as well as bespoke body panels.

The new Isuzu ladder-frame chassis platform dubbed "i-GRIP" (Isuzu Gravity Responsive Intelligent Platform) underpinning the second-generation D-Max is 42% stronger than its predecessors, leading to more improved ride and handling than the first generation. The frame includes improved cross bracing at the rear, improving stability under loads and while towing, while also "ensuring long-term durability when used regularly in harsh environments". The longer wheelbase of 3,095 mm (121.9 in) – 45 mm (1.8 in) longer than before – became standard on all three body styles.

The Transfer case marketing name has been renamed from "Touch-on-the-fly" to new "Terrain command" system, which uses a simple knob to allow for seamless changing of drive modes from to 2-Wheel Drive mode to 4-Wheel Drive mode. The new suspension, made up of independent double wishbone with coil-spring setup at the front and a rear suspension made up of over slung leaf-springs installed above a special long span rear axle, makes for a comfortable driving experience.

The D-Max continues to be offered in all three body styles: Single Cab, Space Cab, and Crew Cab. Customers will also continue to have a choice of rear-wheel drive and four-wheel drive models. The Space Extra Cab has laterally opening doors to give easier access to the rear seat. The D-Max is also equipped with safety features such as Electronic Stability Control (ESC), Traction Control System (TCS), Anti-lock Braking System (ABS), emergency brake assist, a number of airbags and electronic brakeforce distribution (EBD). EBD detects the payload weight and modulates the rear braking force to compensate for the increased vehicle weight. In ESC fitted models, ABS goes to 4-channel 4-sensor type instead of the then 3-channel 4-sensor.

=== 2015 facelift ===
In 2015, the updated D-Max was introduced in Thailand, codenamed RT85. The front fascia was changed with a larger grille and new 1.9-litre RZ4E-TC turbodiesel engine debuted, replacing the 2.5-litre from the outgoing model. Interior remained unchanged from the old model except for some changes including newer 8" inch infotainment system, newer TFT gauges, and cruise control.

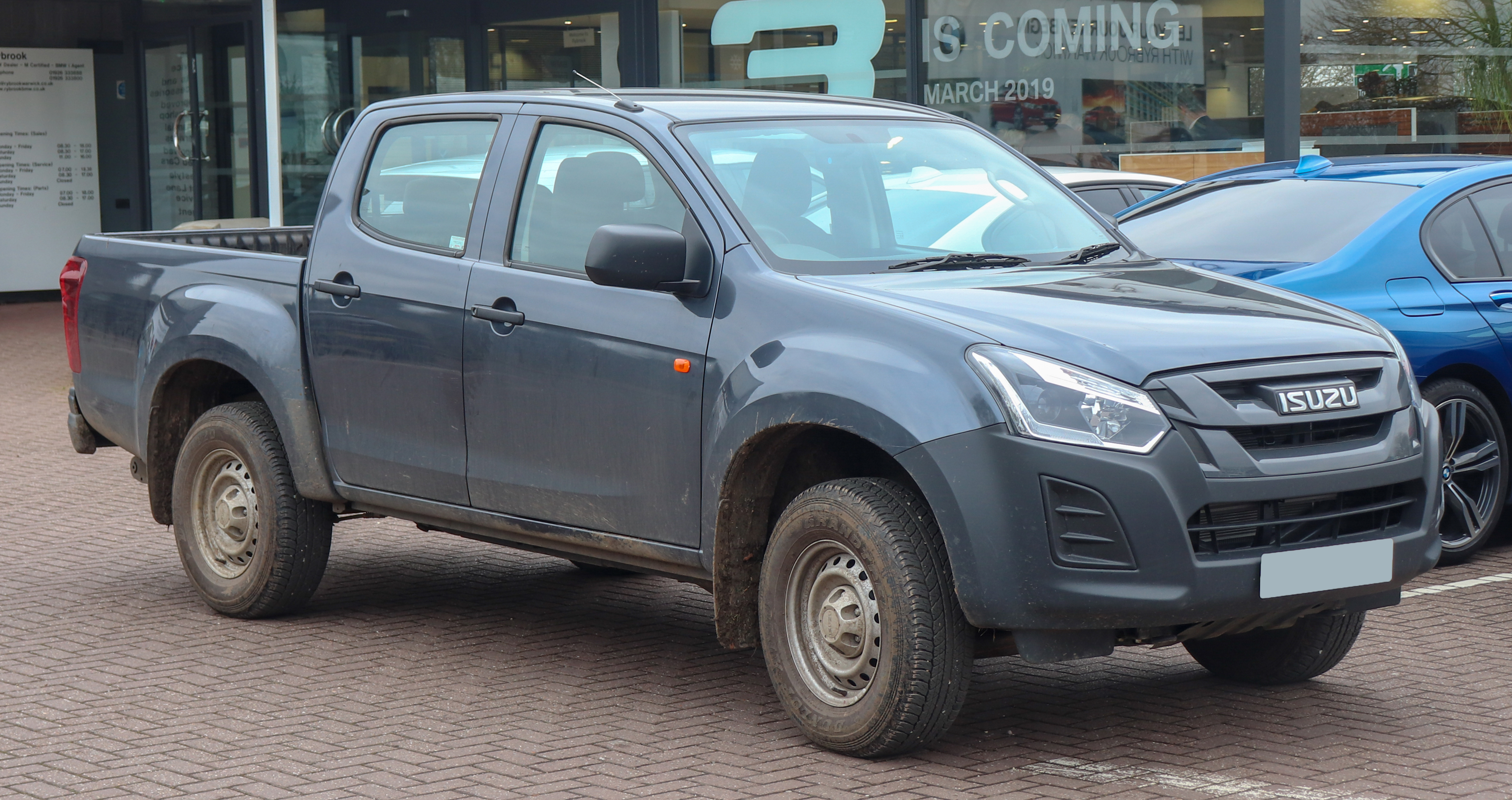
2015 facelift

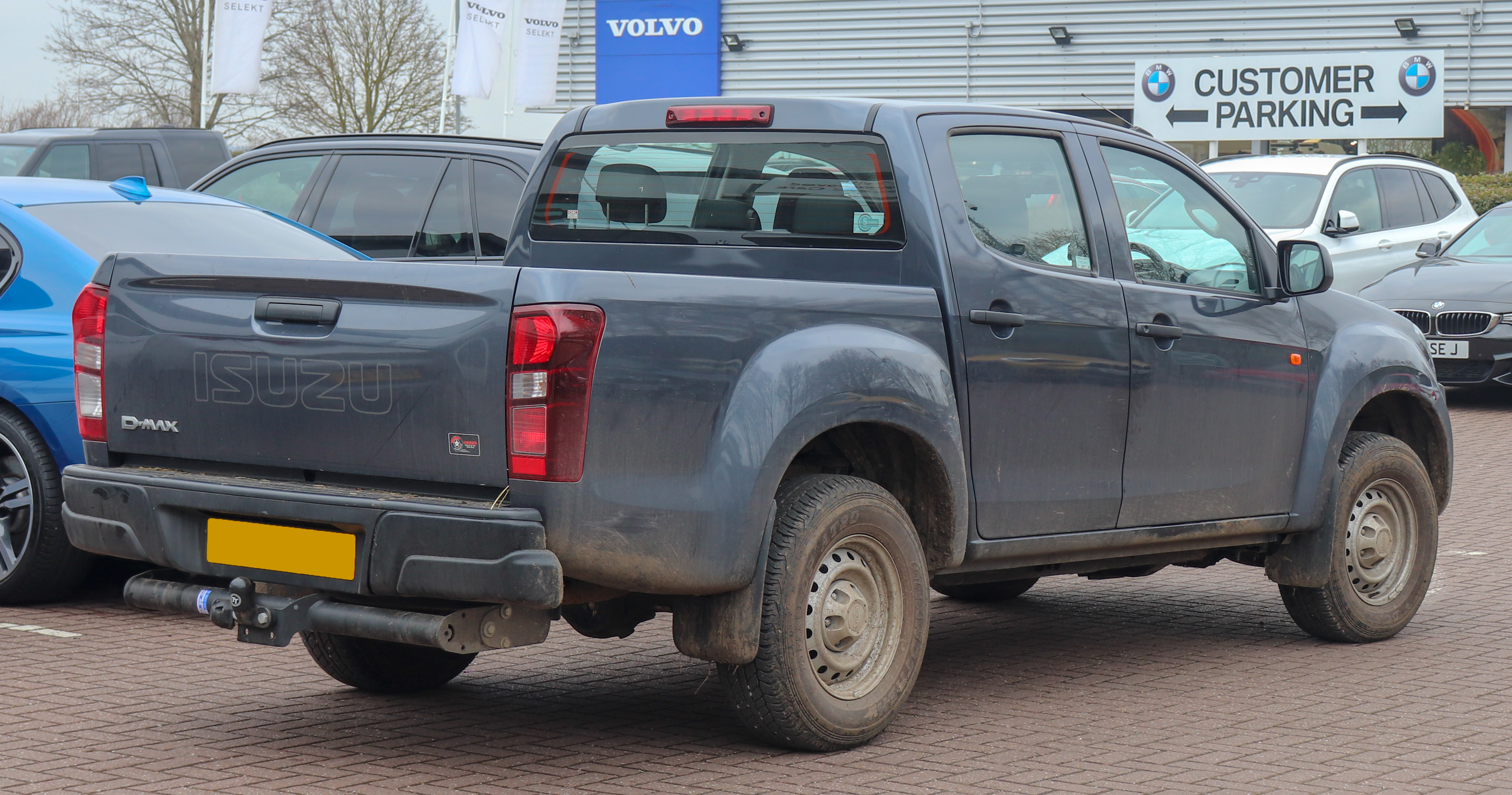
2015 facelift

=== 2017 facelift ===
In 2017, the D-Max was updated again, with a newer front grille and bumper with Bi-LED projector headlamps with LED daytime running lamps, newer alloy wheels and some several changes in the interior for the 2018 model year.

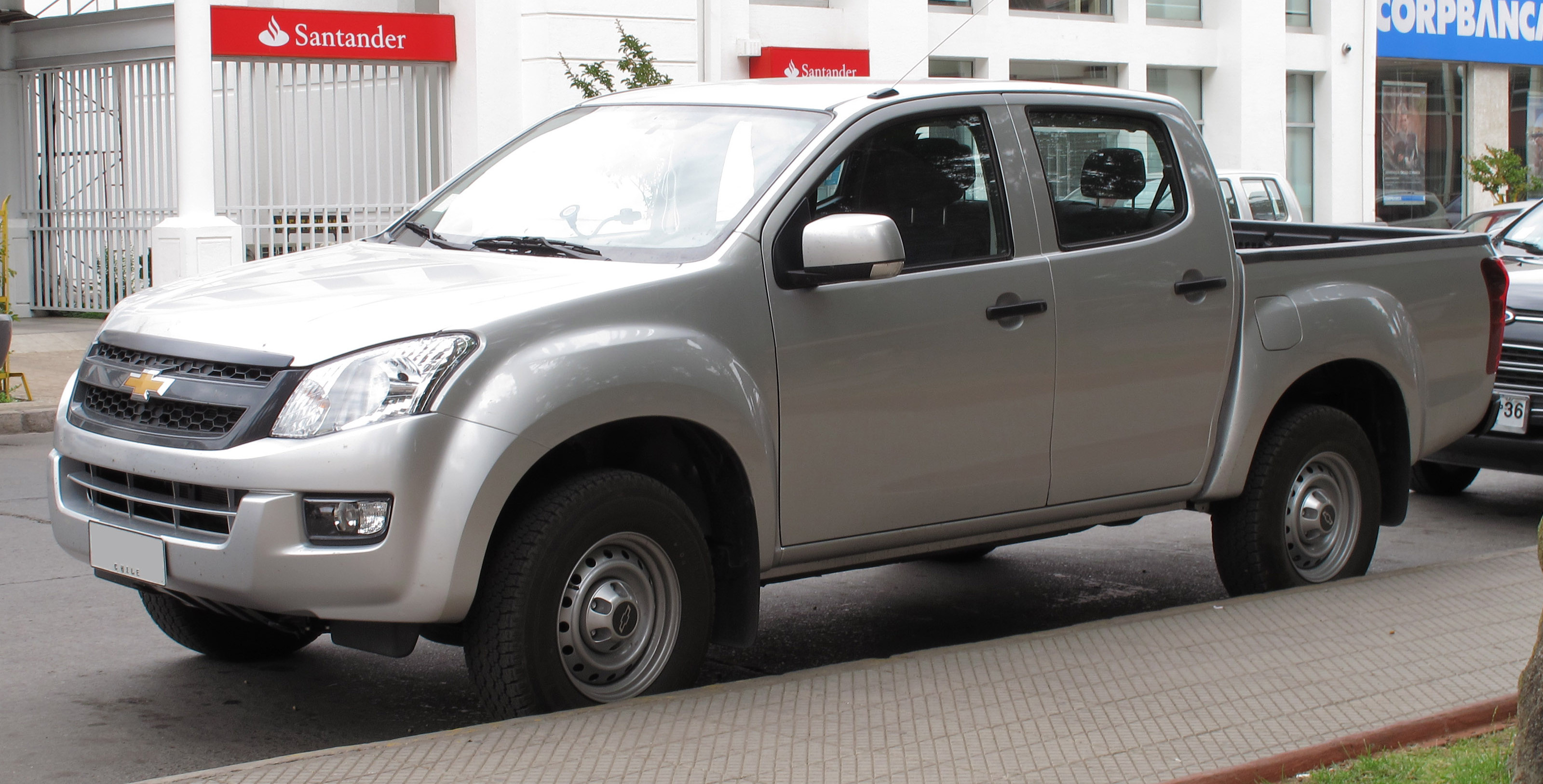
Chevrolet D-Max (Chile)

=== Markets ===
==== Chile ====
The D-Max was marketed in Chile as the Chevrolet D-Max.

==== China ====
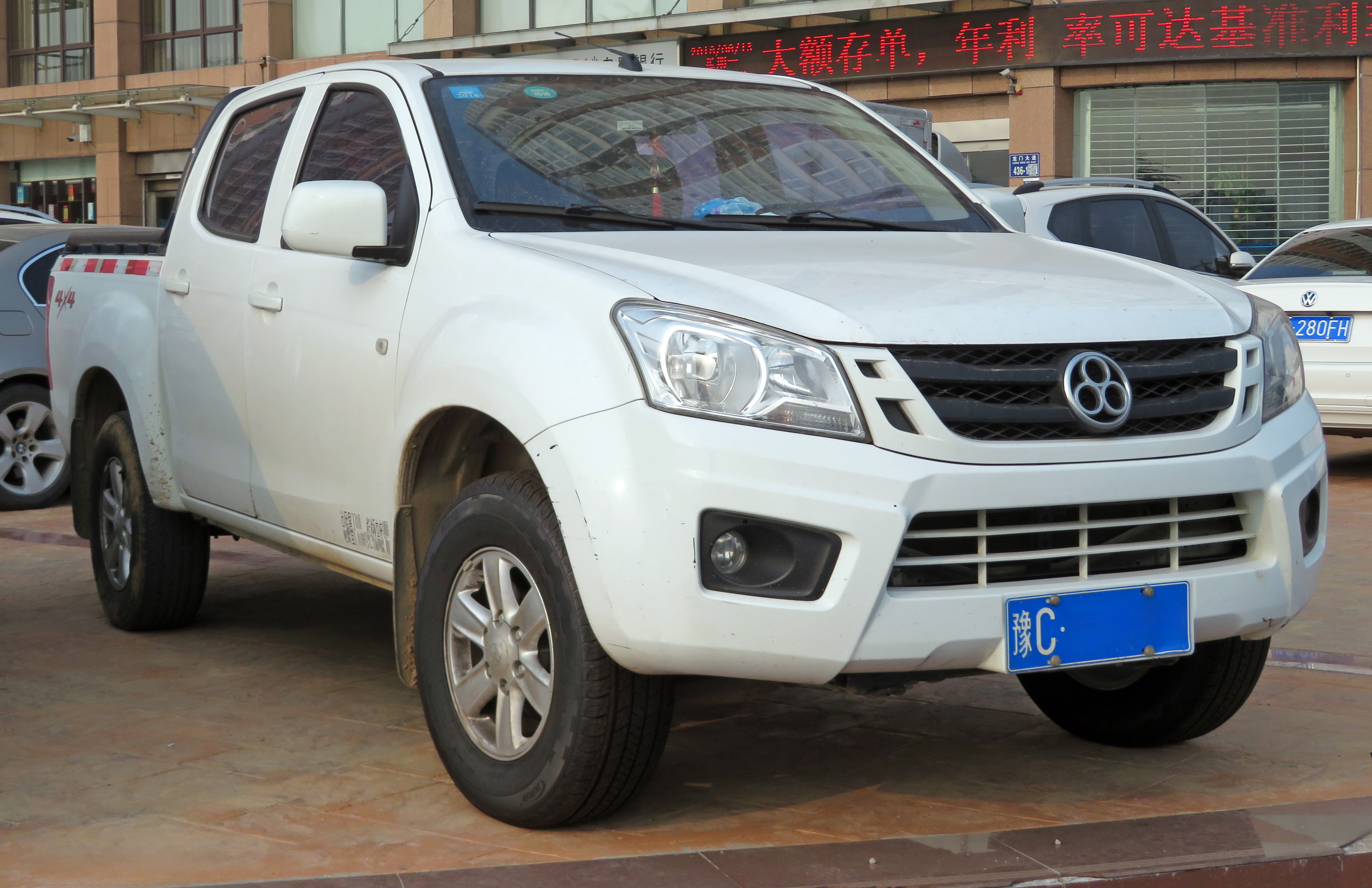
JIM Ruimai (pre-facelift)

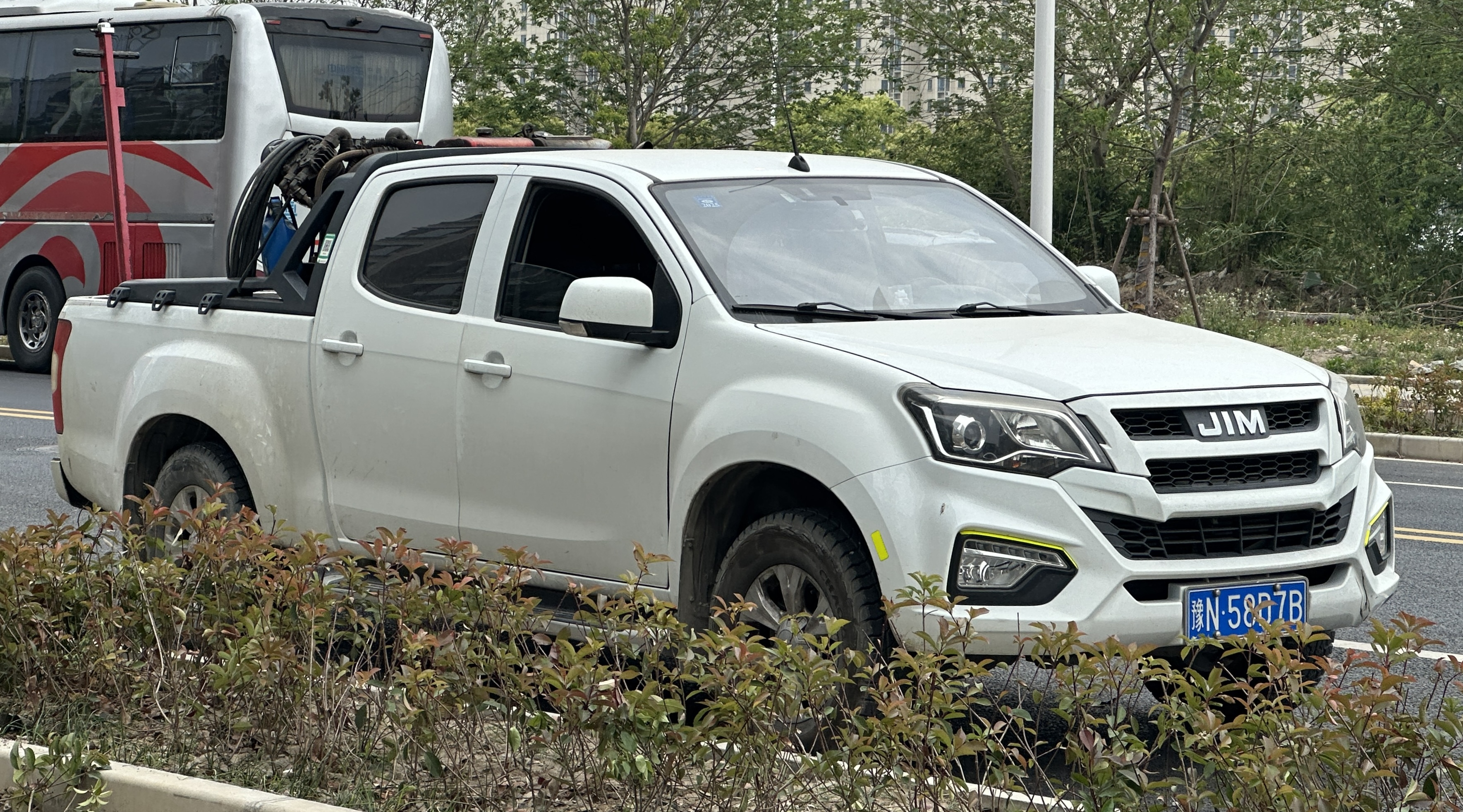
JIM Ruimai S (facelift)

In China, the second-generation D-Max was launched on 7 December 2014 by Jiangxi Isuzu Motors. The engine is 4JK1 2.5 L diesel with 5-speed manual/automatic transmission in 2WD and 4WD model.

A more affordable variant called the Isuzu Ruimai is also available in China. The Ruimai (or Remax) wears the logo of JIM (Jiangxi Isuzu Motors), not of Isuzu. Besides the ICE versions, an all-electric version is also offered.

A restyled variant known as the Ruimai S was unveiled in 2019.

==== Egypt ====
In Egypt, a 2-door commercial variant of the D-Max is sold as the Chevrolet T-Series. It is powered by a 2.5-litre diesel producing 58 kW (79 PS; 78 hp) and 176 N⋅m (130 lb⋅ft) torque.

==== Europe ====
All-new Isuzu D-Max for European market use 2.5-litre twin-turbo diesel that make 163 PS (120 kW; 161 hp) power and 400 N⋅m (295 lb⋅ft) of torque, 5-speed manual replaced with 6-speed one.
In UK, range are Single Cab, Extended Cab, Double Cab, Double Cab Eiger, Double Cab Yukon and Double Cab Utah and all except Single Cab use 4x4 powertrain as standard and featuring standard features such as six airbags, stability control, daytime running lights, rev counter, air conditioning, front electric windows and immobilizer.
In Turkey, available only in single cab (only one model in range) and double cab body and double cab range is HT (4x2 manual), T (4x4 manual), Limited (4x2 and 4x4 manual) and V-Cross (4x4 automatic).

==== Malaysia ====
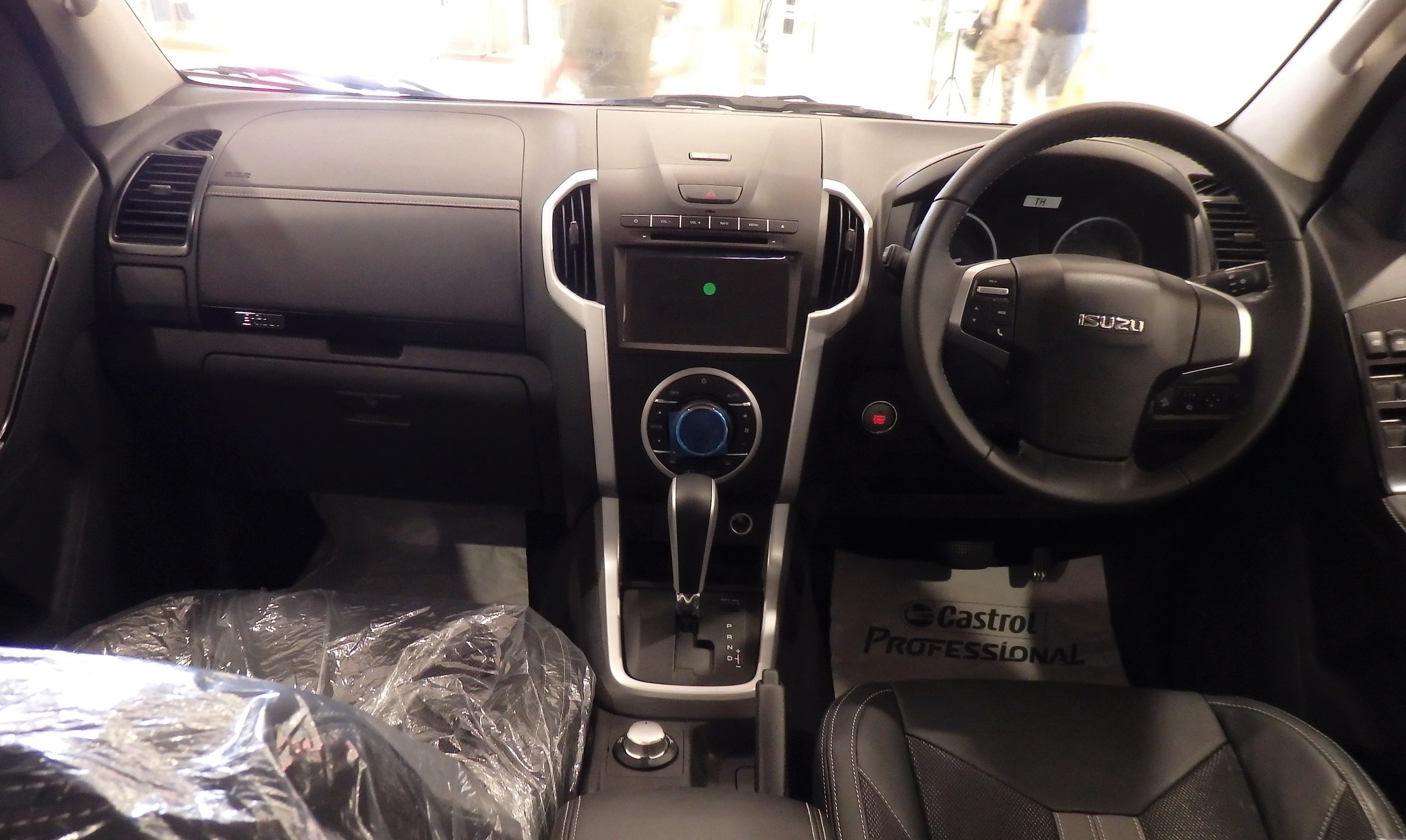
Interior

The second generation Isuzu D-Max was launched in Malaysia in May 2013. The second-generation Isuzu D-Max to "Elevate Your Journey" is the promotional slogan for the new vehicle in Malaysia. A facelift was launched in October 2016 and minor updates occurring in February 2018. Multiple limited editions have been launched for the second generation Isuzu D-Max in Malaysia. The limited editions are the "X-Series" from November 2013 limited to 300 units, the "Artic" from September 2014 limited to 510 units and the "Beast" from May 2016 limited to 360 units. On 18 September 2019, Isuzu Malaysia company had launched the Isuzu D-Max 1.9L Ddi BluePower turbodiesel engine (codename RZ4E-TC), and this is the latest Isuzu D-Max pickup in Malaysia.

==== Philippines ====
In the Philippines, the second generation was launched in September 2013. Isuzu's plans for production of the D-Max was temporarily in Thailand, and by October, the new D-Max was produced at Biñan plant until 2019 when Isuzu Philippines announced that they will stop local production of the D-Max and instead import the D-Max from Thailand. In October 2017, Isuzu Philippines has unveiled the 3.0 TD "Blue Power" diesel engine, along with MU-X.

==== South Africa ====
In South Africa, D Max pick-ups were sold as the Isuzu KB Bakkie. But as of 2018, the KB is called D-Max.

==== Thailand ====
The second generation D-Max was launched in September 2011. Initially offered with three turbodiesel engines, including a pair of 2.5-litre units producing 115 hp (86 kW) and 136 hp (101 kW), and a larger 3.0-litre powerplant with 177 hp (132 kW). Available in 4 models line-up, 3 body type, 3 drivetrains; 2WD, High-ride 2WD (Hi-Lander) or 4WD (V-Cross) in Single cab (Spark), Space Cab and Crew Cab (Cab4) Spark was available only in the 2WD drivetrain. Spark 4WD became available in the 2014 model year. Models line-up are B, S, L, Z and Z Prestige. Standard 2WD models use beige cloth interior, Hi-Lander Z models come with black cloth interior, and Z-Prestige models come with Brown interior; 2.5-litre models come with cloth, 3-litre models come with leather, the meter is really changing, with added of multi-information display with support of Thai language menu operation, 2DIN CD player with Bluetooth and USB connection support or Kenwood DVD system (Changed Isuzu DVD-iGENIE Navi System in MY2013), Audio switch control, Driver power seat, Rear foldable seat (in Crew Cab models), also with over 10 position of intelligent storage space e.g. under steering wheel, over centre console, 10-position cup holders.

In December 2012, the D-Max X-Series was launched in Thailand. Available in three models choices; SpaceCab Z model was called Speed model, Hi-Lander 2-door in Z model and Hi-Lander 4-door in Z-Prestige model. The exterior has a strip line decal on the body, piano-black front grille with the Isuzu badging in red, skirt around the body and black alloy wheel. The interior has a black and red cloth and leather for the Z-Prestige model. The Isuzu logo on the steering wheel were changed to red colour. Exterior colour choices are black and white.

In December 2013, for the 2014 model year, daytime running lamps became standard replacing the fog lamps and the rear lamps received an update for the L, Z and Z-Prestige models.

=== Engines ===
The D-Max uses Isuzu's own engine and drivetrain. Isuzu's iTEQ engine has been retained but has been updated. The 2.5-litre engine is available in two configurations: normal turbo with 87 kW (117 hp) and 280 N⋅m (207 lbf⋅ft) of torque and VGS Turbo with 101 kW (135 hp) and 320 N⋅m (236 lbf⋅ft) of torque. Also available is the four-cylinder 3.0-litre 4JJ1-TC iTEQ common-rail diesel engine with VGS Turbo which produces 132 kW (177 hp) with 380 N⋅m (280 lbf⋅ft) of torque. Engines performance have been upgraded with variable geometry turbocharger (VGS Turbo) and are compliant with Euro V emission standard. The second-generation D-Max features a 5-speed manual, with optional 5-speed Rev-Tronic automatic transmission with sport mode replacing the previous generation 4-speed automatic.

Ecuador is the only country where this generation D-Max is available with a petrol engine, an Opel-based 2.4-litre C24 engine with 16 valves and double overhead camshafts supplied from Brazil where the lower-trim versions of the Chevrolet S10 still rely on a flex-fuel 8-valve SOHC version which also served as a basis for the Vortec 2400 industrial engine.

=== Safety ===
Euro NCAP test results* Isuzu D-Max Crew Cab 2.5 diesel (RHD) (2012)
Test	Points	%
Overall:	4 /5 stars	
Adult occupant:	29.9	83%
Child occupant:	32.8	67%
Pedestrian:	18.4	51%
Safety assist:	5	71%

ANCAP test results* Isuzu D-Max [select variants] (2012)
Test	Score
Overall	4 /5 stars
Frontal offset	10.48/16
Side impact	16/16
Pole	2/2
Seat belt reminders	2/3
Whiplash protection	Good
Pedestrian protection	Marginal
Electronic stability control	Standard

ANCAP test results* Isuzu D-Max Crew Cab: 4x4 (all) and 4x2 (high ride) (2013)
Test	Score
Overall	5 /5 stars
Frontal offset	13.58/16
Side impact	16/16
Pole	2/2
Seat belt reminders	2/3
Whiplash protection	Good
Pedestrian protection	Marginal
Electronic stability control	Standard

ANCAP test results* Isuzu D-Max 4x4 crew cab (2013)
Test	Score
Overall	5 /5 stars
Frontal offset	13.58/16
Side impact	16/16
Pole	2/2
Seat belt reminders	2/3
Whiplash protection	Good
Pedestrian protection	Marginal
Electronic stability control	Standard

ANCAP test results* Isuzu D-Max 4x4 crew cab (2013)
Test	Score
Overall	5 /5 stars
Frontal offset	13.58/16
Side impact	16/16
Pole	2/2
Seat belt reminders	2/3
Whiplash protection	Good
Pedestrian protection	Marginal
Electronic stability control	Standard

ANCAP test results* Isuzu D-Max 4x2 High Ride Crew Cabs (2013)
Test	Score
Overall	5 /5 stars
Frontal offset	13.58/16
Side impact	16/16
Pole	2/2
Seat belt reminders	2/3
Whiplash protection	Good
Pedestrian protection	Marginal
Electronic stability control	Standard

== Third generation (RG; 2019) ==
Third generation
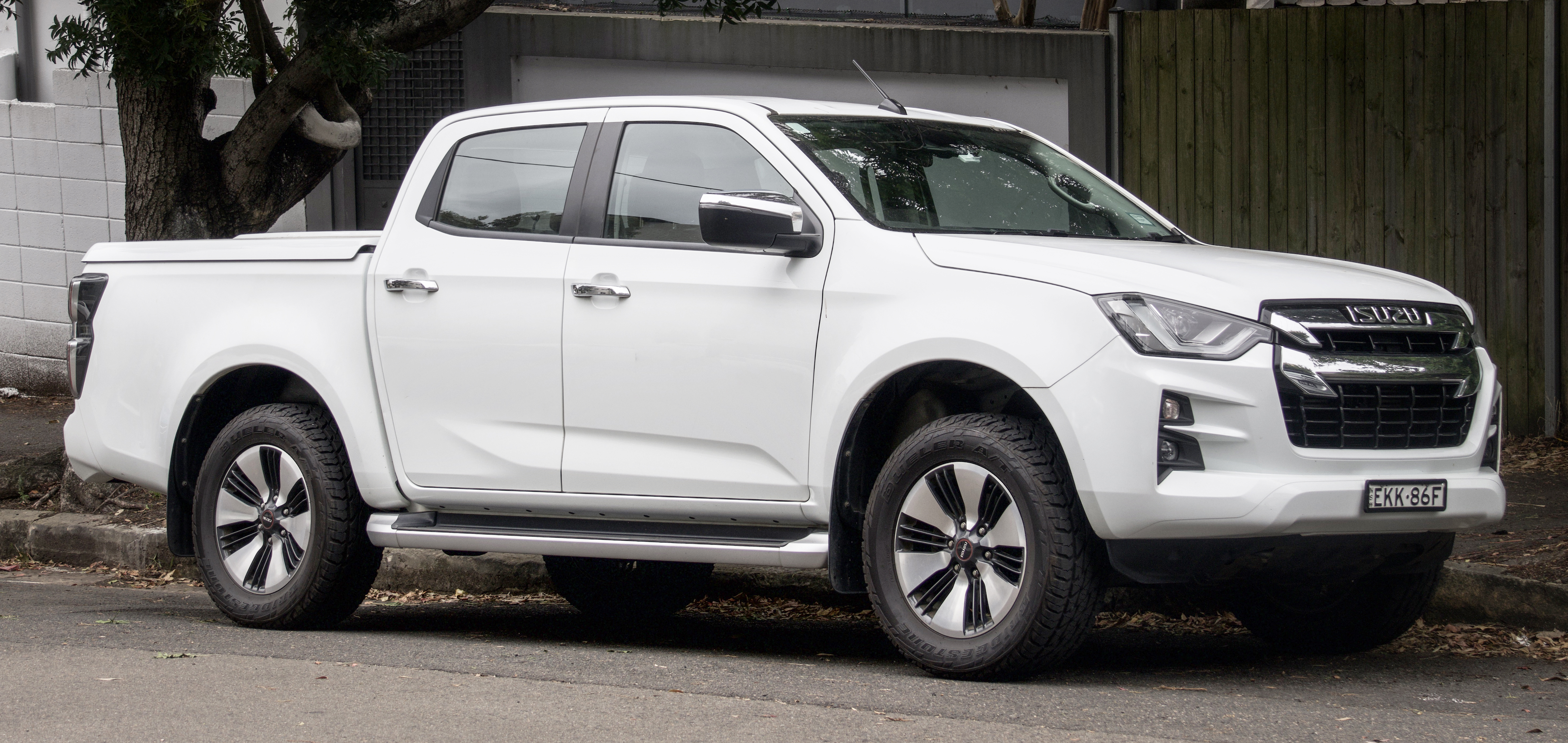
- Pre-facelift

Overview
- Model code: RG01
- Also called: Isuzu T30 (China); Isuzu Pickup Truck (Colombia); Qingling Tazun (China)
- Production: 2019–present
- Assembly: Thailand: Samut Prakan (Isuzu Motors Thailand); China: Jiangxi (Jiangxi Isuzu); South Africa: Port Elizabeth; Ukraine: Cherkasy (Isuzu Ataman; planned)
- Designer: Naoyuki Akashi

Body and chassis
- Body style: 2-door single cab; 4-door extended cab with rear clamshell doors; 4-door double cab
- Layout: Dual-motor, all-wheel-drive (EV)
- Platform: Isuzu Dynamic Drive/Symmetric Mobility Platform
- Related: Mazda BT-50 (TF); Isuzu MU-X (second generation)

Powertrain
- Engine: Diesel: 1.9 L RZ4E-TC GEN2 I4; 2.2 L RZ4F-TC I4-T; 2.2 L RZ4F-TCX I4-TT; 3.0 L 4JJ3-TCX I4-T
- Transmission: 6-speed Aisin AE6 manual; 6-speed Aisin AWR6B45 Rev-Tronic automatic; 8-speed Aisin LB500 "Rev-Tronic" automatic (2024)
- Hybrid drivetrain: Mild hybrid
- Battery: MHEV: 48V, 8.4Ah, 370Wh; BEV: 66.8-kWh Li-ion
- Range: 163 mi (262.3 km)
- Plug-in charging: 11 kW (AC); 50 kW (DC)

Dimensions
- Wheelbase: 3,125 mm (123.0 in)
- Length: 5,230 mm (205.9 in) (single cab); 5,195–5,285 mm (204.5–208.1 in) (double cab)
- Width: 1,810–1,870 mm (71.3–73.6 in)
- Height: 1,690–1,810 mm (66.5–71.3 in)

The third-generation D-Max debuted in Thailand on 11 October 2019. The new D-Max has grown slightly in size with the most notable increase being the 3,125 mm (123.0 in) wheelbase length. Isuzu claims the new D-Max delivers reduced fuel consumption and improved safety.

The vehicle rides on the body-on frame Isuzu Dynamic Drive Platform, also called the Symmetric Mobility Platform later. The platform is claimed to be 23 percent stiffer. As for the improvements, the company has expanded the cross section of the ladder frame, optimised the locations of the crossmembers and increased impact absorption, making the frame lighter, stiffer and safer. To improve weight distribution, the engine has been moved slightly behind the front axle, resulting in a "semi-midship" layout.

In June 2020, Mazda released the third-generation BT-50 which is heavily based on the third-generation D-Max. As the result, it is also manufactured at Isuzu Motor Thailand. It is a result of an alliance between Mazda and Isuzu which was signed on 11 July 2016, with Isuzu agreeing to supply pickup trucks to Mazda. The third-generation D-Max ceased to share platform with Chevrolet Colorado.

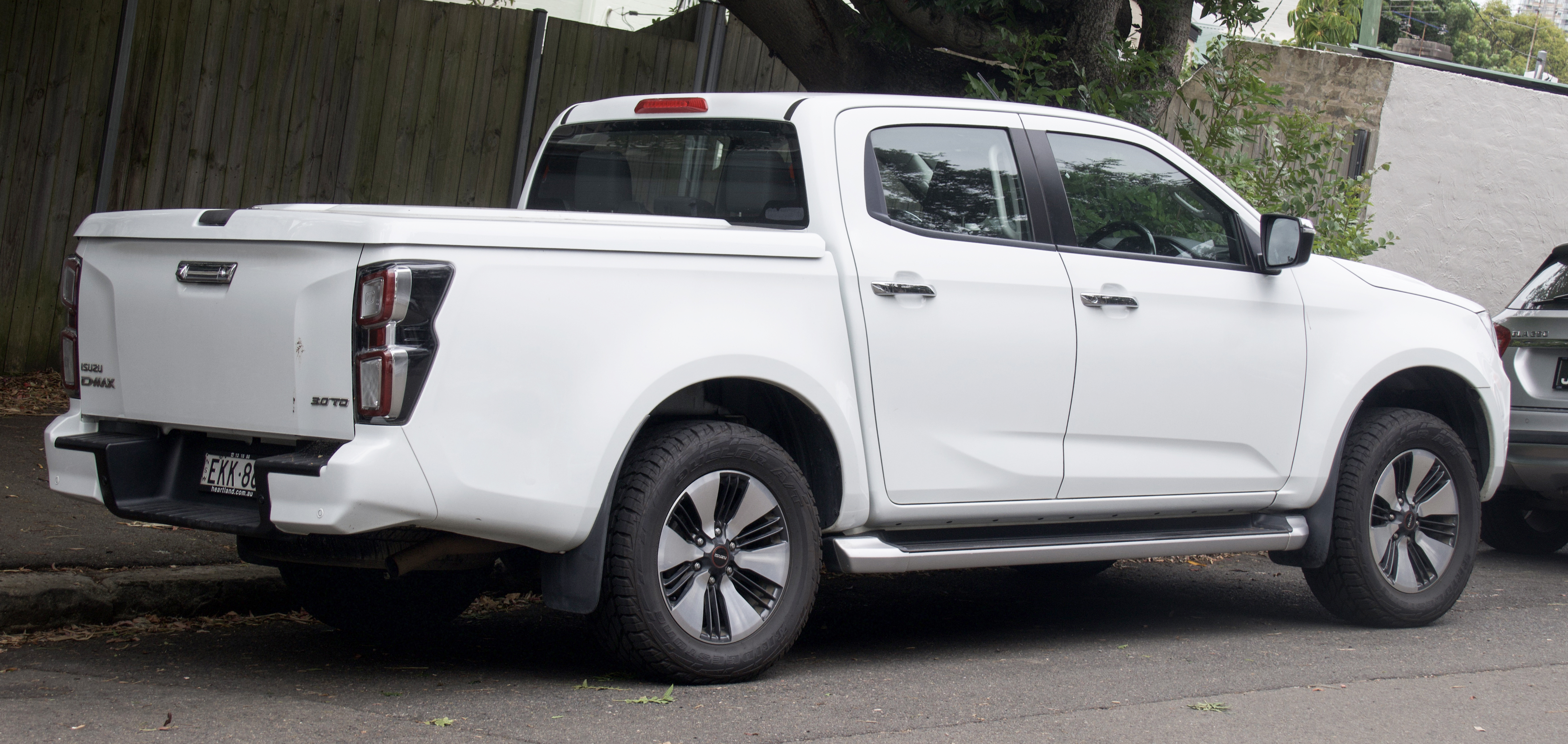
Rear

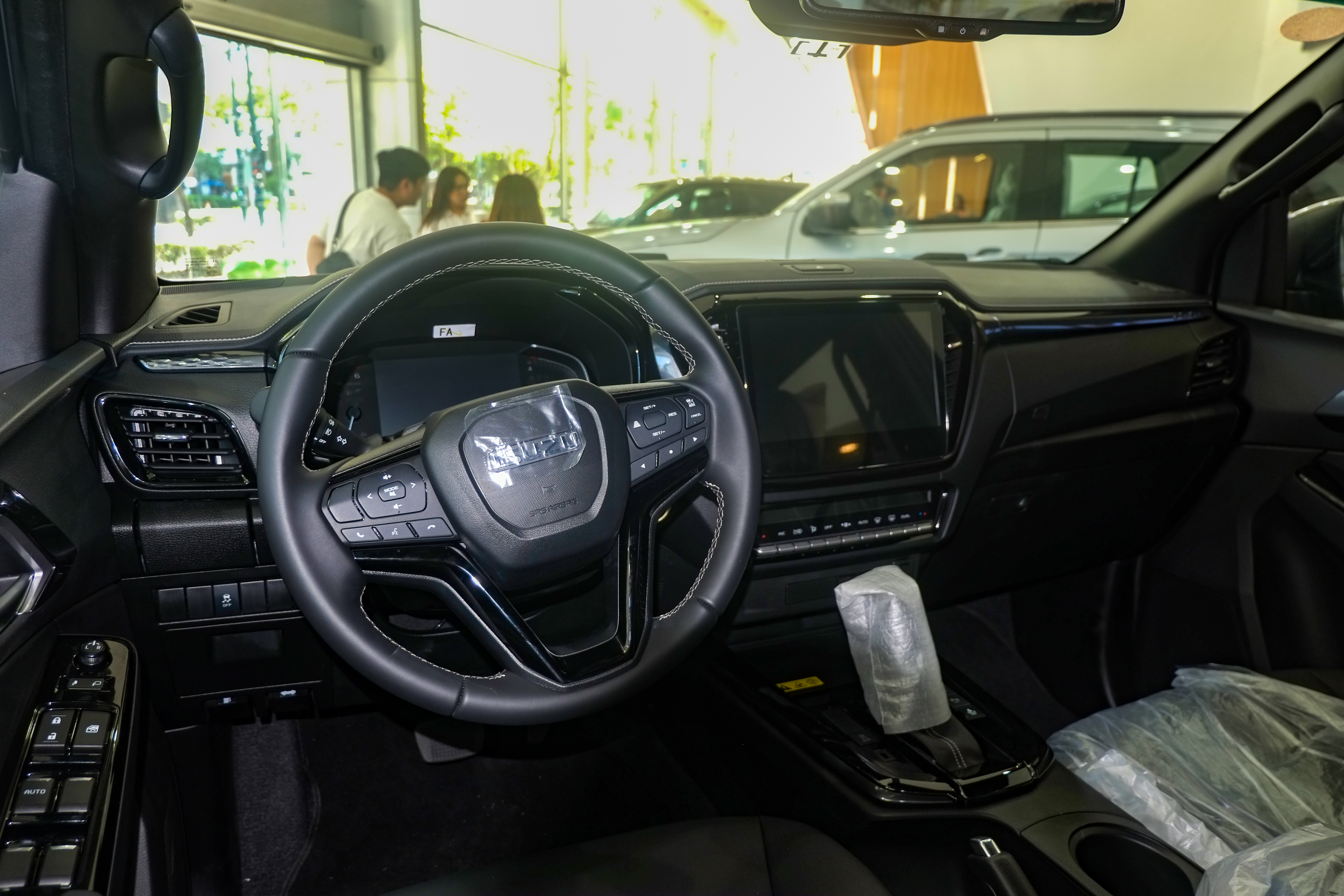
Interior

=== Markets ===
==== Australia ====
The third-generation D-Max was launched in Australia on 1 September 2020, with four trim levels: SX, LS-M, LS-U and X-Terrain, powered by a 3.0-litre turbocharged diesel engine with the option between 4x2 (rear-wheel-drive) and 4x4 (four-wheel-drive). In Australia, it is available with Single Cab, Space Cab and Crew Cab bodystyles.

The facelifted D-Max was launched in Australia on 25 April 2024, with five trim levels: SX, LS-M, X-Rider, LS-U, LS-U+ and X-Terrain, powered by either 1.9-litre or 3.0-litre turbocharged diesel engines. In September 2025, the 1.9-litre turbocharged diesel engine option was replaced with the 2.2-litre diesel turbocharged engine.

A "Blade" trim was introduced in Australia in 2025, based on the LS-U+ trim with modifications by Walkinshaw Performance. It is positioned above the X-Terrain trim.

==== Cambodia ====
The third-generation D-Max was launched in Cambodia on 31 October 2020.

==== Indonesia ====
The third-generation D-Max was launched in Indonesia on 11 November 2021, it is offered in three trim levels: 1.9L MT Single Cab, 1.9L MT Double cab, and 1.9L MT Rodeo.

The facelifted D-Max Rodeo was launched in Indonesia on 12 April 2026 at the GIICOMVEC 2026, powered by the 1.9-litre turbocharged diesel paired with a 6-speed manual.

==== Malaysia ====
The third-generation D-Max was launched in Malaysia on 26 April 2021, it is offered in seven variants: 1.9L 4×4 Single Cab, 3.0L 4×4 Single Cab, 1.9L 4×4 MT Standard, 1.9L 4×4 AT Standard, 1.9L 4×4 AT Premium, 3.0L 4×4 AT Premium and 3.0L 4×4 AT X-Terrain.

In October 2021, a new 1.9 4x2 AT Plus trim was added to the line-up.

On 17 June 2022, the flagship 3.0 4x4 AT X-Terrain trim received some new feature upgraded levels including two new colour option, a 360-degree view monitor and wireless charging.

In February 2023, the Malaysian-market D-Max received a refresh for the 2023 model year, with revisions applied inside and out bringing updates in terms of aesthetics as well as equipment. All seven trim levels remain on sale.

The facelifted D-Max was launched in Malaysia on 14 May 2024, with variants and engine choices remain unchanged from the pre-facelift model.

==== New Zealand ====
The third-generation D-MAX was launched in New Zealand on 18 November 2020, with four trim levels: LX, LS-M, LS and X-Terrain, powered by a 3.0-litre turbocharged diesel engine with the option between 4x2 (rear-wheel-drive) and 4x4 (four-wheel-drive). The X-Terrain variant comes only as a Double Cab configuration.

==== Philippines ====
The third-generation D-Max was launched in the Philippines on 4 March 2021. It was initially offered in 1.9 Single Cab, 1.9 LT 4×2, 3.0 LT 4×4, 1.9 LS 4×2, 3.0 LS 4×2, 3.0 LS-A 4×2, 3.0 LS 4×4 and 3.0 LS-E 4×4 trim models.

In July 2022, the LS trim was removed from the lineup and two new trim levels were introduced; 3.0 Single Cab 4×4 MT and 3.0 LS-A 4×4 MT.

In April 2023, the LS-E and LS-A trim levels received some feature upgrades levels such as the slightly redesigned grille and new alloy rims design.

The facelifted D-Max was launched in the Philippines on 20 June 2024, it is available with five trim levels: Single Cab, LT, LS-A, LS-A Plus and LS-E.

In October 2026, the LS grade was reintroduced to the lineup, exclusively offered in 4×2 and powered by a 1.9-litre turbocharged diesel engine paired with the 6-speed automatic transmission.

==== South Africa ====
The third-generation D-Max was launched in South Africa on 7 April 2022, with a total of twenty-three variants, it is available with either 1.9-litre and 3.0-litre turbocharged diesel engines with the option of either 4x2 (rear-wheel drive) and 4x4 (four-wheel drive). For South Africa, the D-Max comes in Single Cab, Extended Cab and Double Cab bodystyles.

In January 2024, the X-Rider trim was added to the line-up it is powered by a 1.9-litre turbocharged diesel engine.

In February 2024, the LS trim and a 3.0-litre turbocharged diesel engine was made available for the single cab bodystyle.

In August 2025, the X-Rider Black trim powered by the 1.9-litre turbocharged diesel engine was made available limited to 150 units.

The facelifted D-Max was launched in South Africa on 12 May 2026, with a total of 32 variants. Like the pre-facelift model, the facelift model is available with either 1.9-litre and 3.0-litre turbocharged diesel engines with the option of either 4x2 (rear-wheel drive) and 4x4 (four-wheel drive), and the same bodystyles. The changes were the 3.0-litre engine was made available for the X-Rider trim, new 4x4 (four-wheel drive) variants for the Extended Cab model, and a new Low Rider trim replaced the LS as the entry-level trim.

==== Thailand ====
The vehicle is available in the market as the Regular Cab, the Extended Cab, and the Crew Cab. The Regular Cab, also called a single cab is known as the D-Max Spark and is also available in Cab and Chassis version. The Extended Cab version is available in Hi-Lander and Space Cab trim levels. The Crew Cab is available in V-Cross, Hi-Lander 4, and Cab 4. As the top trim, the V-Cross comes with six airbags, blind spot monitoring, rear cross traffic alert, stability control, traction control, Bi-LEDs, and a UV blocking windshield. Later in 2021, the updated D-Max was launched in Thailand, with the pick-up gaining new enhancements followed by a slight price increase.

The facelifted model is available in the same body configurations and engine options from the pre-facelift model, with a total of 25 variants available under the Spark, Hi-Lander and V-Cross model lines.

The D-Max EV was launched in Thailand on 17 March 2026, in the sole variant.

==== United Kingdom ====
The third-generation D-Max went on sale in the UK in April 2021. In the UK, the D-Max comes in Single Cab, Extended Cab and Double Cab bodystyles, four trim levels, and powered by a 1.9-litre turbocharged diesel engine.

In September 2021, Isuzu UK teamed up with Arctic Trucks to introduce the D-Max AT35, built for serious off-roaders.

==== Vietnam ====
The third-generation D-Max was launched in Vietnam on 16 April 2021, it is offered in three variants: 1.9L 4x2 Prestige MT, 1.9L 4x2 Prestige AT and 1.9L 4x4 Type Z AT.

The facelifted D-Max was launched in Vietnam on 23 October 2024, with the same variants from the pre-facelift model.

=== Facelift ===
The facelifted D-Max debuted on 6 October 2023 in Thailand, with a new front fascia design, new headlights, a new tailgate, updated graphics for taillights and a few interior changes.

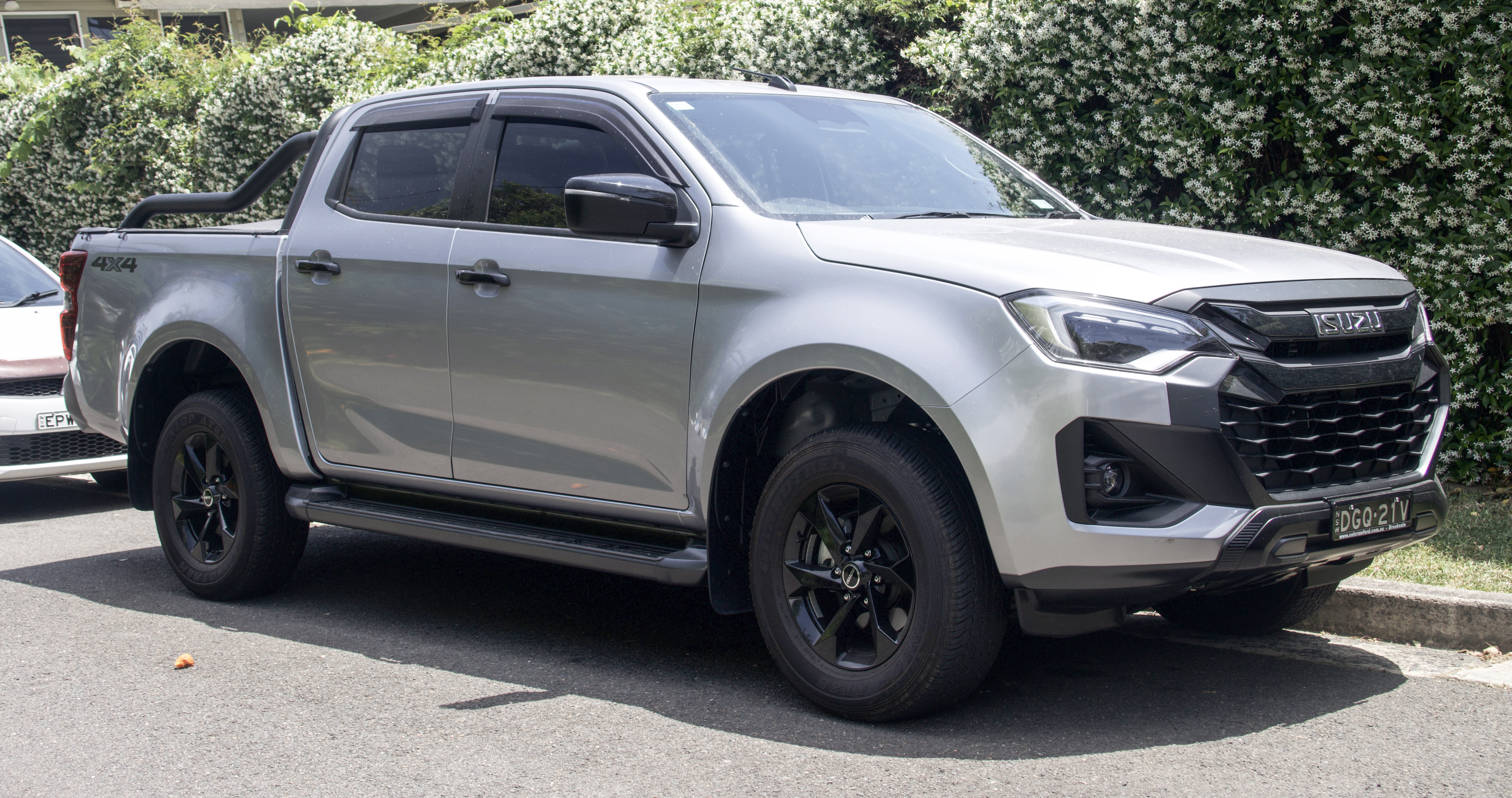
D-Max X-Rider

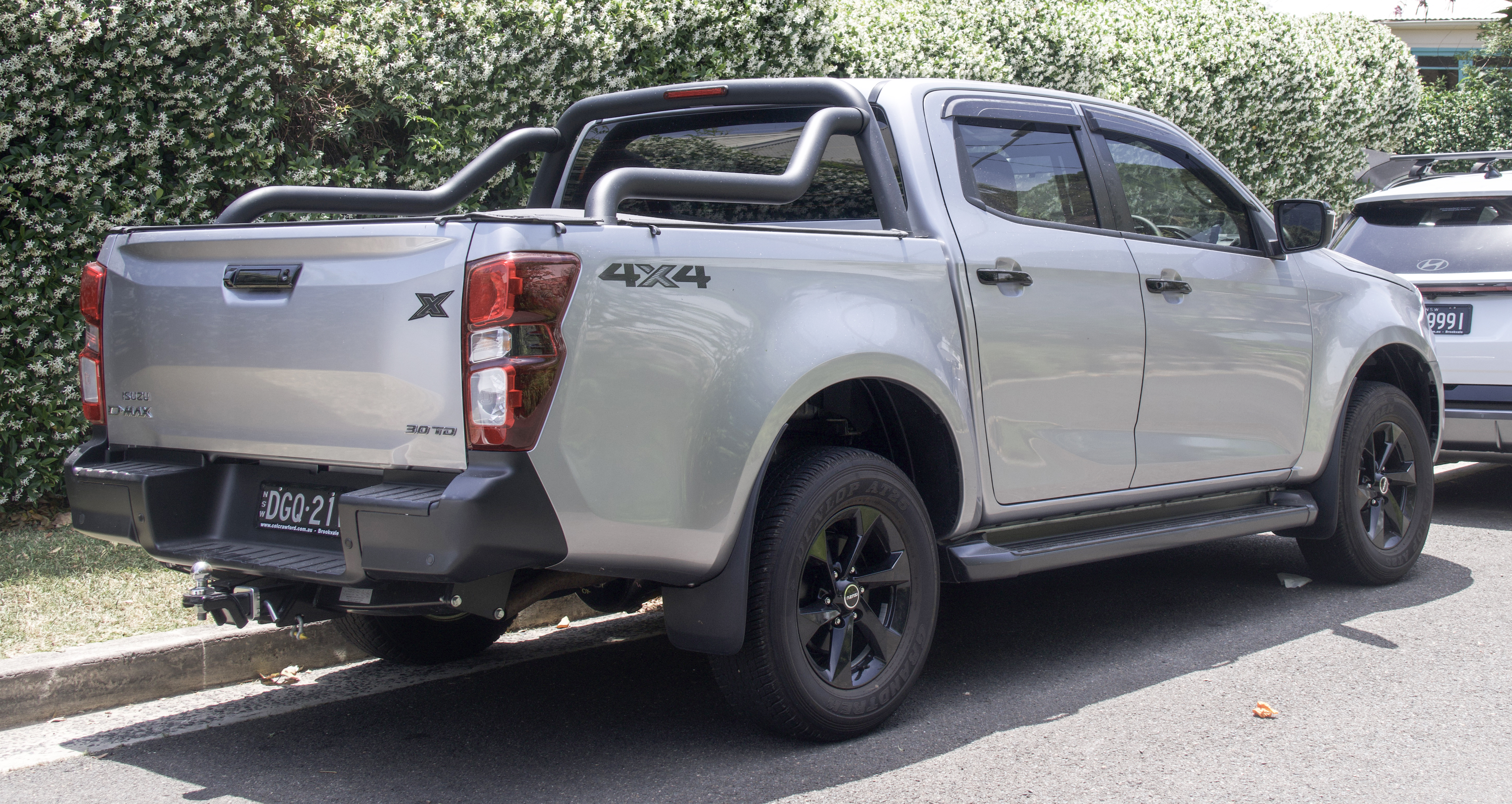
D-Max X-Rider

=== Engines ===
The 1.9-litre and 3.0-litre four-cylinder turbodiesel engines were carried over from the previous generation. While the 1.9-litre RZ4E-TC engine remains unchanged, the 3.0-litre engine, renamed 4JJ3-TCX, has received several updates, including a reshaped combustion chamber, higher-pressure injectors, a diamond-like carbon coating on the piston pins, an electronic variable geometry turbocharger and a double-scissor timing gear. It led to the increase of 13 PS (13 hp; 10 kW) and 70 N⋅m (7.1 kg⋅m; 52 lb⋅ft) over the old 4JJ1-TCX. The 2.2 Ddi MaxForce diesel engine was introduced in November 2024. The 2.2 Ddi MaxForce Bi-Turbo diesel engine was introduced in October 2026.

Diesel engines
Model	Code	Engine	Power	Torque	Transmissions
1.9 Ddi Blue Power	RZ4E-TC GEN2	1,898 cc common rail injection turbo-diesel I4	150 PS (110 kW; 148 hp) @ 3,600 rpm	350 N⋅m (36 kg⋅m; 258 lb⋅ft) @ 1,800–2,600 rpm	6-speed manual 6-speed automatic
1.9 Ddi Blue Power	RZ4E-TC GEN2	1,898 cc common rail injection turbo-diesel I4	163 PS (120 kW; 161 hp) @ 3,600 rpm	360 N⋅m (37 kg⋅m; 266 lb⋅ft) @ 2,000–2,500 rpm	6-speed manual 6-speed automatic
2.2 Ddi MaxForce	RZ4F-TC	2,164 cc common rail injection turbo-diesel I4	163 PS (120 kW; 161 hp) @ 3,600 rpm	400 N⋅m (41 kg⋅m; 295 lb⋅ft) @ 1,600–2,600 rpm	6-speed manual 8-speed automatic
2.2 Ddi MaxForce; Bi-Turbo	RZ4F-TCX	2,164 cc common rail injection twin-turbo-diesel I4	204 PS (150 kW; 201 hp) @ 3,600 rpm	500 N⋅m (51 kg⋅m; 369 lb⋅ft) @ 1,600–2,600 rpm	6-speed manual 8-speed automatic
3.0 Ddi VGS	4JJ3-TCX	2,999 cc common rail injection turbo-diesel I4	190 PS (140 kW; 187 hp) @ 3,600 rpm	450 N⋅m (46 kg⋅m; 332 lb⋅ft) @ 1,600–2,600 rpm	6-speed manual 6-speed automatic

=== D-Max EV ===
The battery electric version of the D-Max was unveiled at the 2025 Commercial Vehicle Show in Birmingham, England. It is available in extended-cab and dual-cab configurations. Production began in April 2025 for delivery in selected European markets later that year, while production of right-hand drive models began at the end of 2025. Pre-sales for the UK began in the second half of 2025 and deliveries scheduled to commence in February 2026. It uses a 66.9-kWh lithium-ion battery and comes standard with a dual-motor, all-wheel-drive setup making 188 PS (138 kW; 185 hp) and 325 N⋅m (33 kg⋅m; 240 lb⋅ft) of torque and can travel 163 miles (263 kilometers) on a single charge.

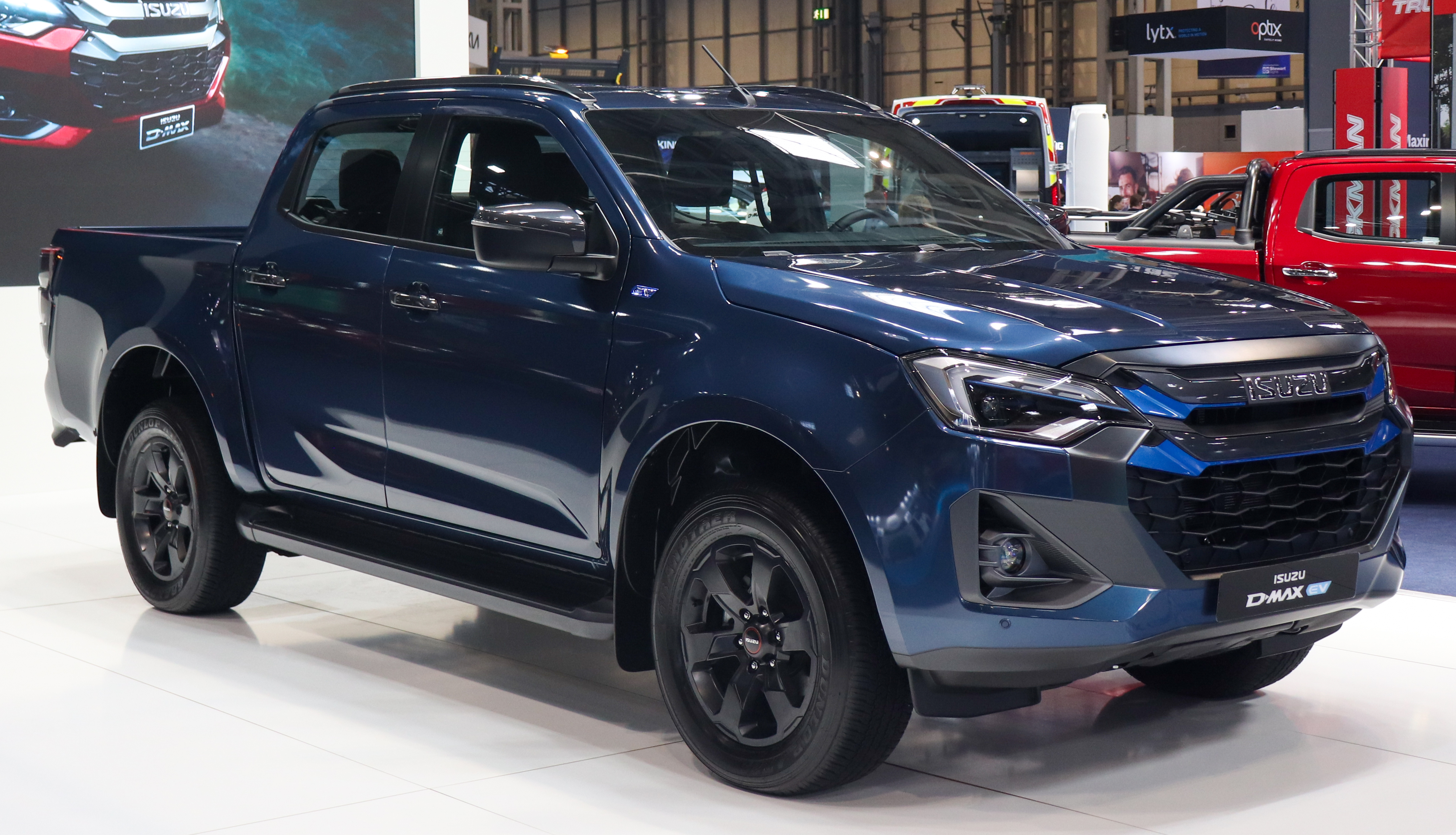
Isuzu D-Max EV

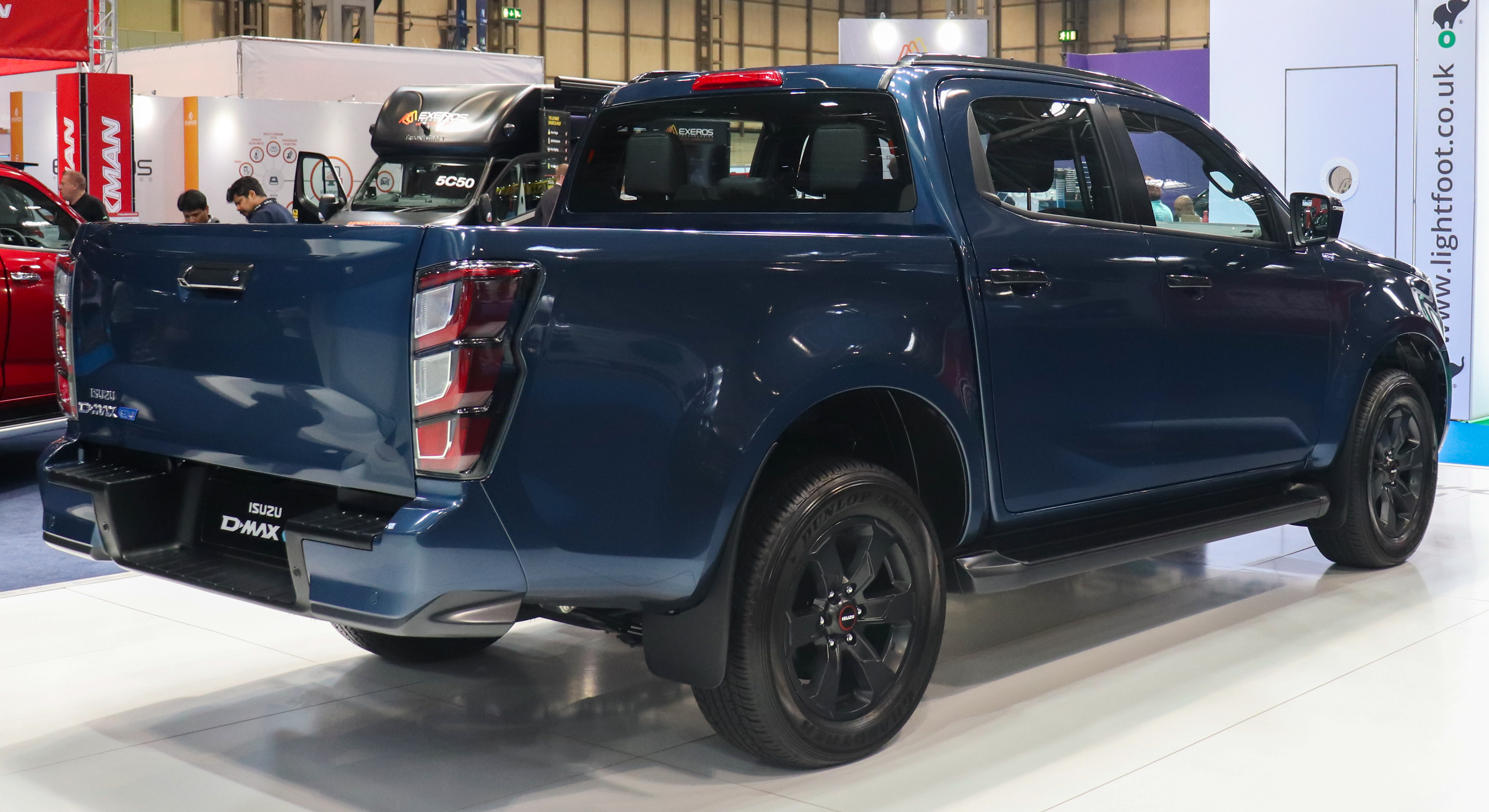
Rear view

=== Safety ===
The model has earned a five-star crash safety rating from ASEAN NCAP, Australasian NCAP and Euro NCAP. It is the first pick-up to receive five stars under the Euro NCAP assessment.

ASEAN NCAP test results Isuzu D-Max (2020)
Test	Points
Overall:	5 /5 stars
Adult occupant:	42.72
Child occupant:	21.83
Safety assist:	18.61

Euro NCAP test results Isuzu D-Max (2020)
Test	Points	%
Overall:	5 /5 stars	
Adult occupant:	32.2	84%
Child occupant:	42.2	86%
Pedestrian:	37.6	69%
Safety assist:	13.4	83%

ANCAP test results Isuzu D-Max all variants (2020, aligned with Euro NCAP)
Test	Points	%
Overall:	5 /5 stars	
Adult occupant:	31.86	83%
Child occupant:	44	89%
Pedestrian:	37.63	69%
Safety assist:	13.49	84%

ANCAP test results Isuzu D-Max all variants excluding Blade (2022, aligned with Euro NCAP)
Test	Points	%
Overall:	5 /5 stars	
Adult occupant:	33	86%
Child occupant:	44	89%
Pedestrian:	37.63	69%
Safety assist:	13.49	84%

== Sales ==
Year	Thailand	Australia	Malaysia (Note: Figures based on registration (Malaysia))	Indonesia
2005			409	783
2006			1,158	505
2007			1,535	684
2008			2,854	498
2009			3,015	292
2010			4,012	1,070
2011			4,881	845
2012			3,903	1,547
2013			5,090	963
2014	128,496		5,727	389
2015	118,719		5,588	498
2016	120,009		6,457	1,445
2017	133,794		5,139	1,164
2018	149,578	11,776	5,060	500
2019	143,693	13,226	3,785	430
2020	160,328	15,062	4,014	184
2021	149,102	25,117	4,592	280
2022	175,425	24,336	9,206	1,273
2023	115,499	31,202	9,555	1,474
2024	61,580	30,194	6,847	224
2025		26,839	6,748	
