= Jiangxi Isuzu =

Chinese truck manufacturer

Jiangxi Isuzu Motors Co., Ltd.
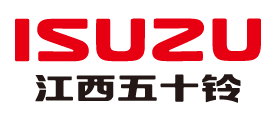
- Type: Joint venture
- Industry: Automotive
- Founded: April 2013; 13 years ago (as Jiangxi Isuzu)
- Headquarters: Nanchang, Jiangxi, China
- Area served: China
- Products: Pickup trucks, SUVs, diesel engines
- Owners: Isuzu (50%); JMCG (50%)

Chinese name
- Simplified Chinese: 江西五十铃汽车有限公司
- Traditional Chinese: 江西五十鈴汽車有限公司
Transcriptions
Standard Mandarin
- Hanyu Pinyin: Jiāngxī Wǔshílíng Qìchē Yǒuxiàn Gōngsī

Jiangxi Isuzu
- Simplified Chinese: 江西五十铃
- Traditional Chinese: 江西五十鈴
Transcriptions
Standard Mandarin
- Hanyu Pinyin: Jiāngxī Wǔshílíng
Gan
- Romanization: Kongsi Usetliang
- Website: Jiangxi Isuzu

Jiangxi Isuzu Motors Co., Ltd. (JIM) is a joint venture between Isuzu and Jiangling Motors Corporation Group (JMCG). The venture is headquartered in Nanchang, Jiangxi province. It is focused on the production and sale of Isuzu pickups and their engines for the Chinese market.

== History ==
The first joint venture between Isuzu and Jiangxi Automotive Manufacturing Plant (which would later be renamed JMCG) was established in March 1983. Isuzu N-series trucks were manufactured from 1985 onwards. In 1993, when Jiangling Motors Corporation was spun off from JMCG, Jiangxi Automobile Manufacturing Co., Ltd. (a JMCG subsidiary), Itochu Trading and Isuzu created the Jiangling Isuzu joint venture to continue producing Isuzu-badged trucks for 20 years. JMCG owned a 75% stake and the rest was evenly distributed between Isuzu and Itochu. JMCG and Isuzu restructured their agreement in 2012, and the equally-owned Jiangxi Isuzu took charge of Isuzu production in April 2013.

The first vehicle product of the new Jiangxi Isuzu venture, the Isuzu D-Max was launched on 7 December 2014 by Jiangxi Isuzu. The engine used is the 4JK1 2.5L diesel with 5 Speed Manual/Automatic transmission in 2WD and 4WD models.

== Models ==
=== Current ===
==== D-Max ====
The Isuzu D-Max pickup truck, offered in many markets, is also manufactured in China.

==== Lingtuo ====
The Lingtuo resembles the D-Max, but is cheaper.

==== Ruimai and Ruimai S ====
Unlike the two models described above, the Ruimai (or Remax) bears the logo of JIM (Jiangxi Isuzu Motors). It is not originally the same product due to its different production and assembly, thus selling a different unit to the market with the same conceptual objective. Isuzu. Besides the ICE versions, an all-electric version is also offered.

A restyled variant known as the Ruimai S was unveiled in 2019.

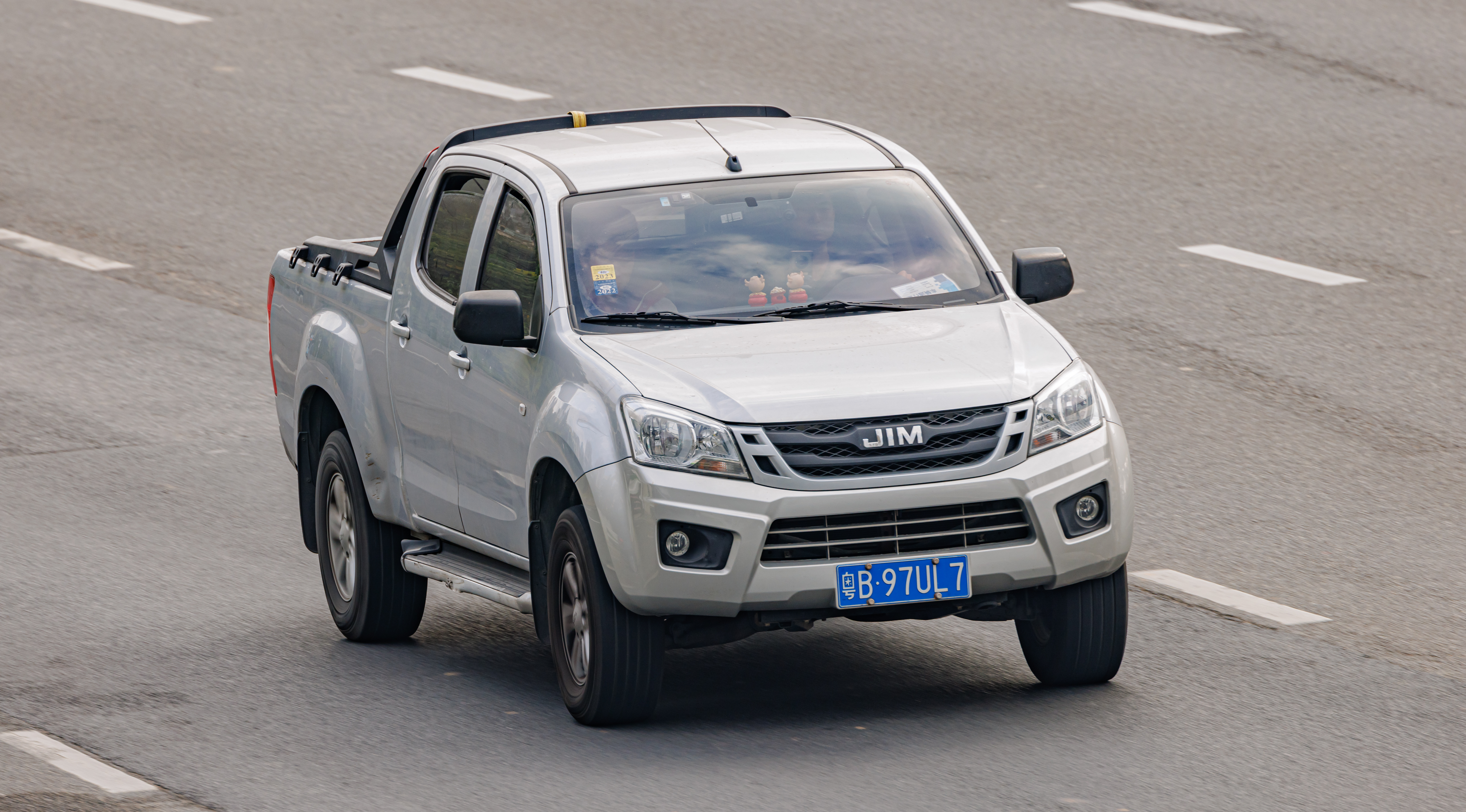
JIM Ruimai

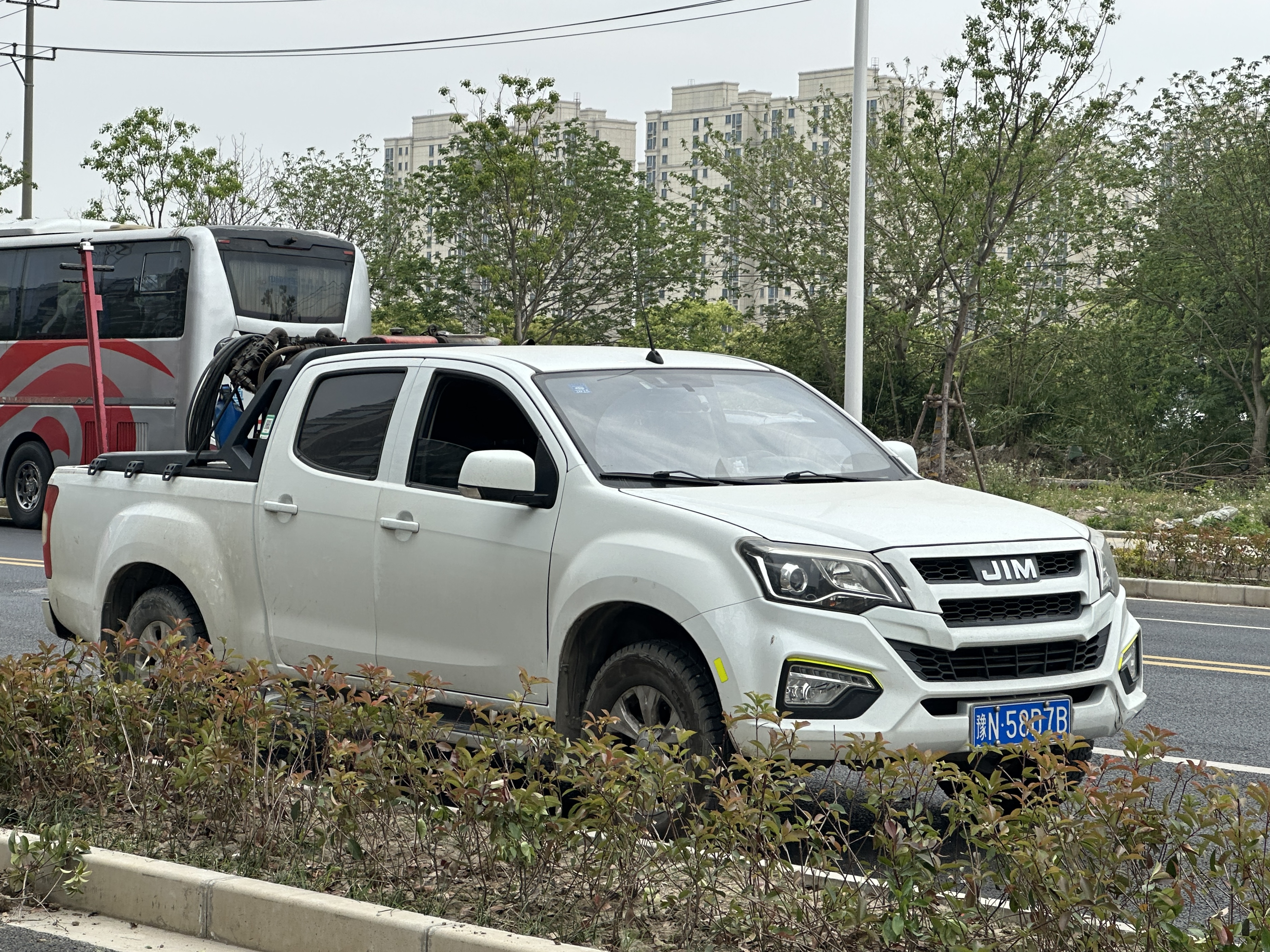
JIM Ruimai S

==== MU-X ====
The Isuzu MU-X was also produced in China by Jiangxi Isuzu.

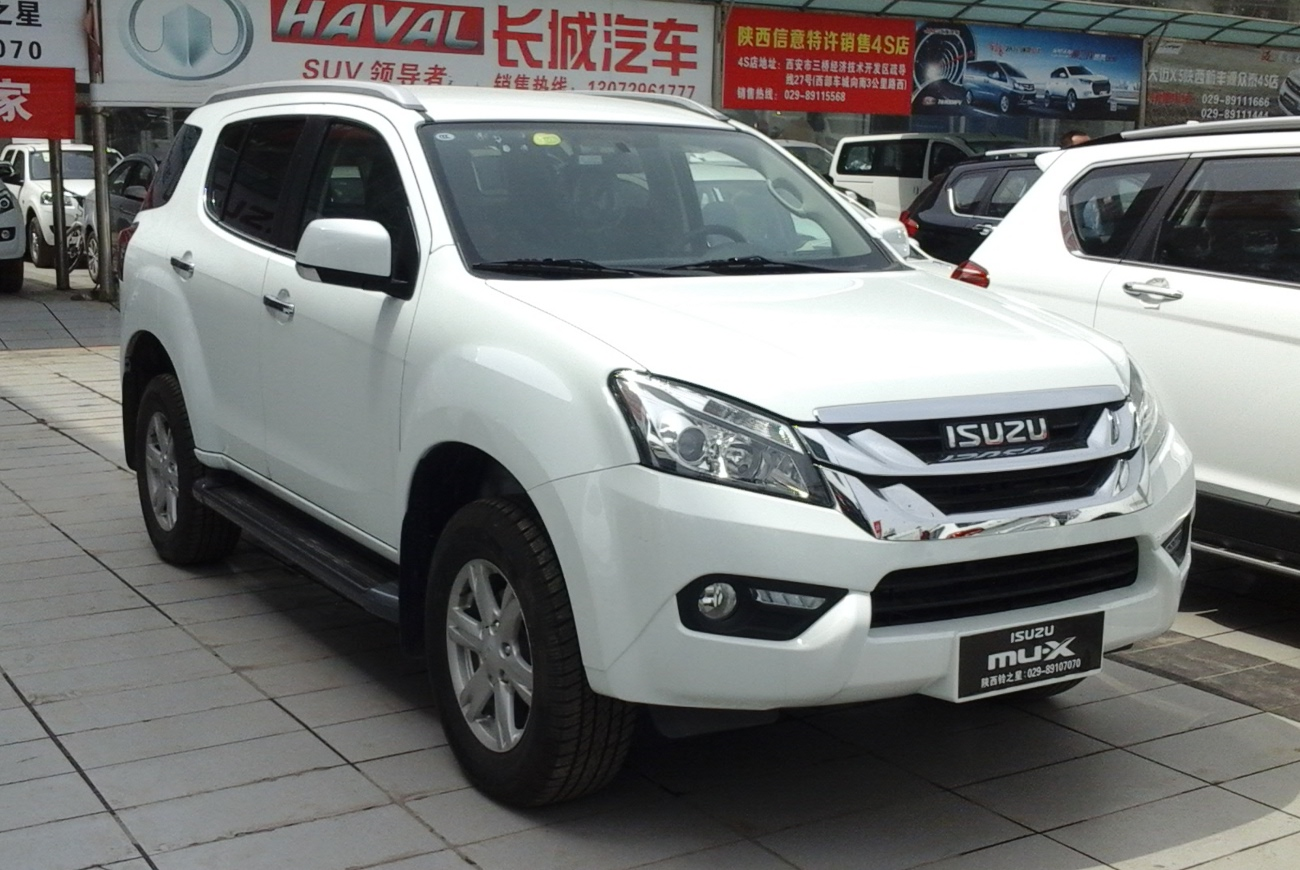
Isuzu MU-X

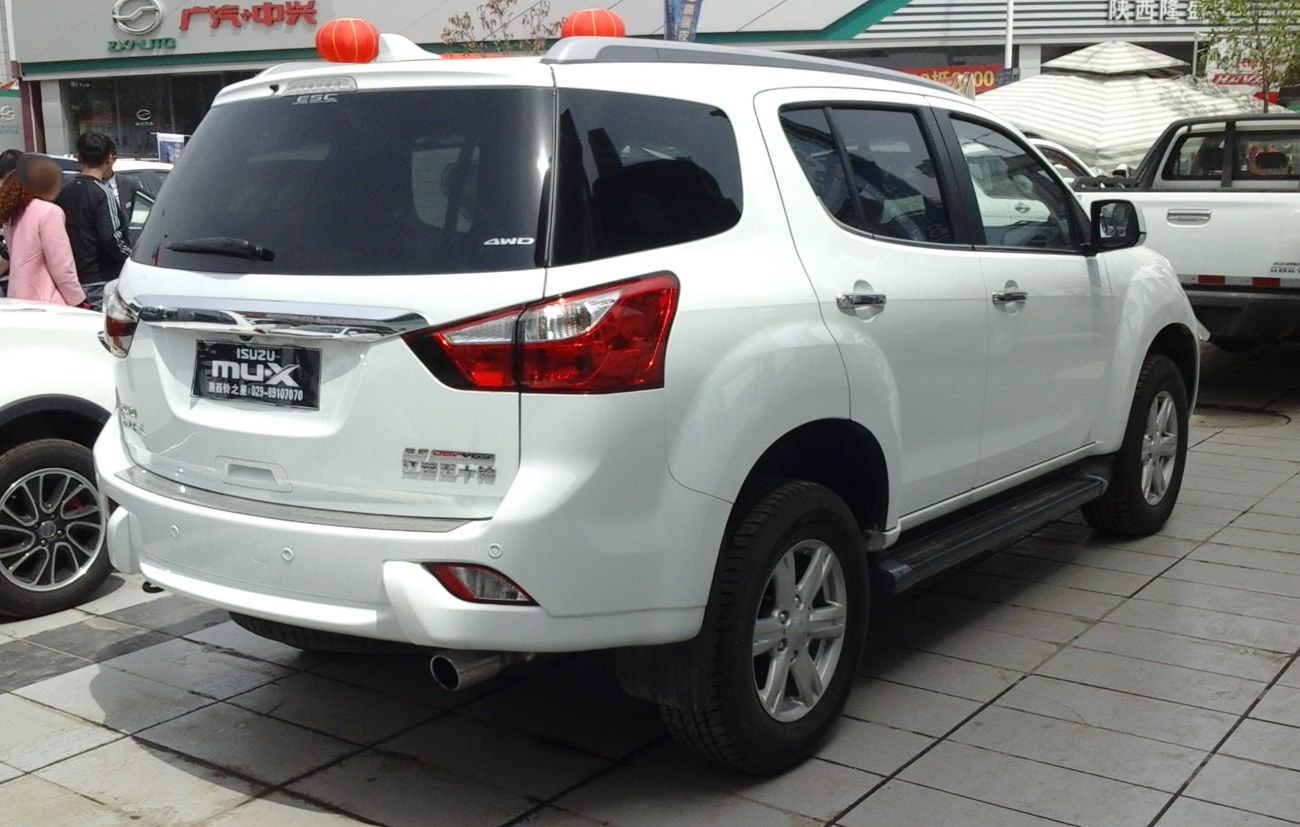
Rear view

=== Upcoming ===
==== TE-M7 ====
JIM TE-M7 is a boxy mid-sized pickup truck to be released in 2026 or 2027. 2.8L diesel or 3.0L diesel, only available as four door crew cab with five seats. 5265mm length standard model, 5590mm length long wheelbase model, width of both is 1890mm. Height 1850mm to 1900mm depending on trim.
