= Vehicle identification number =

System for identifying vehicles

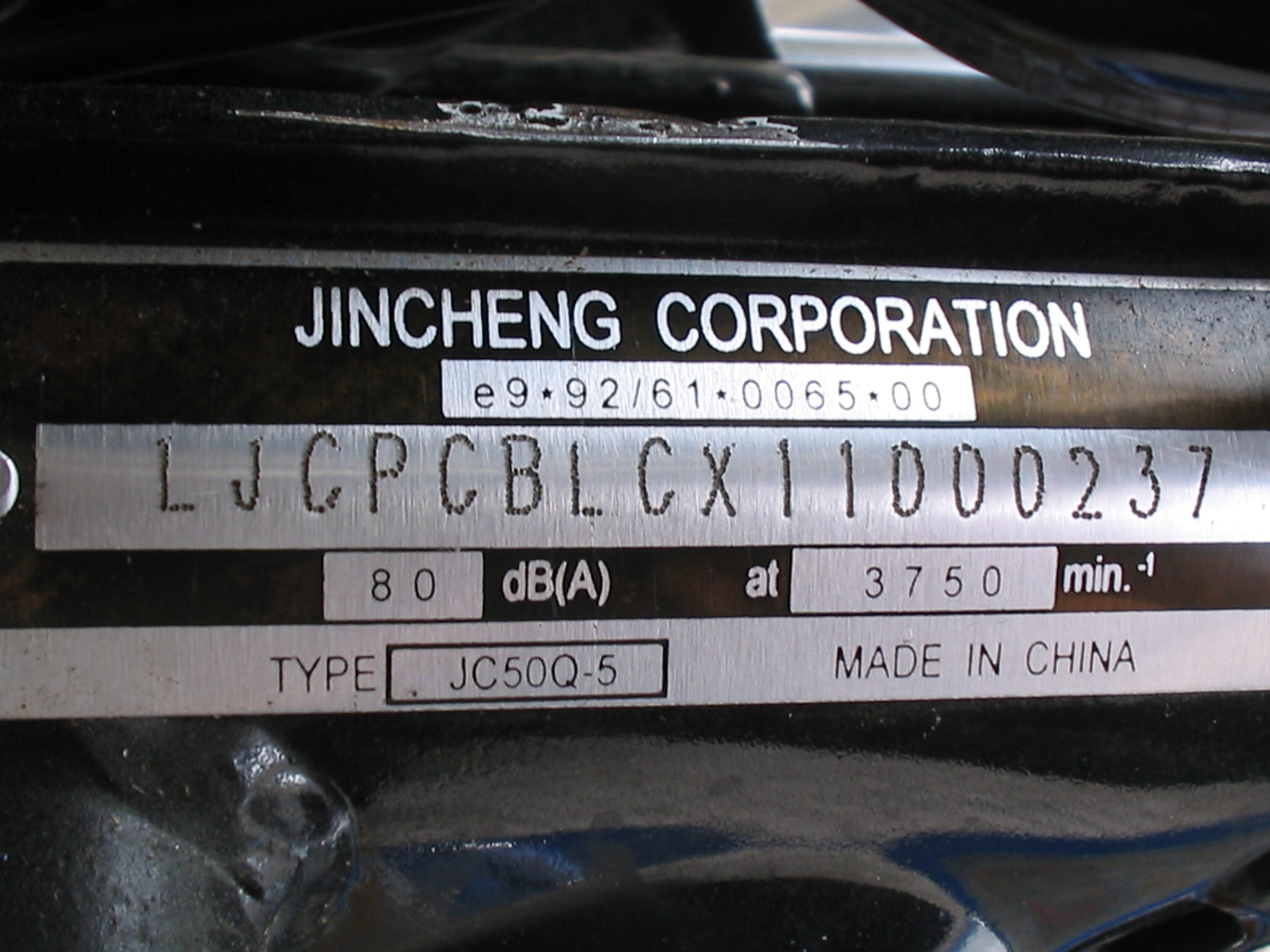
VIN on a Chinese moped

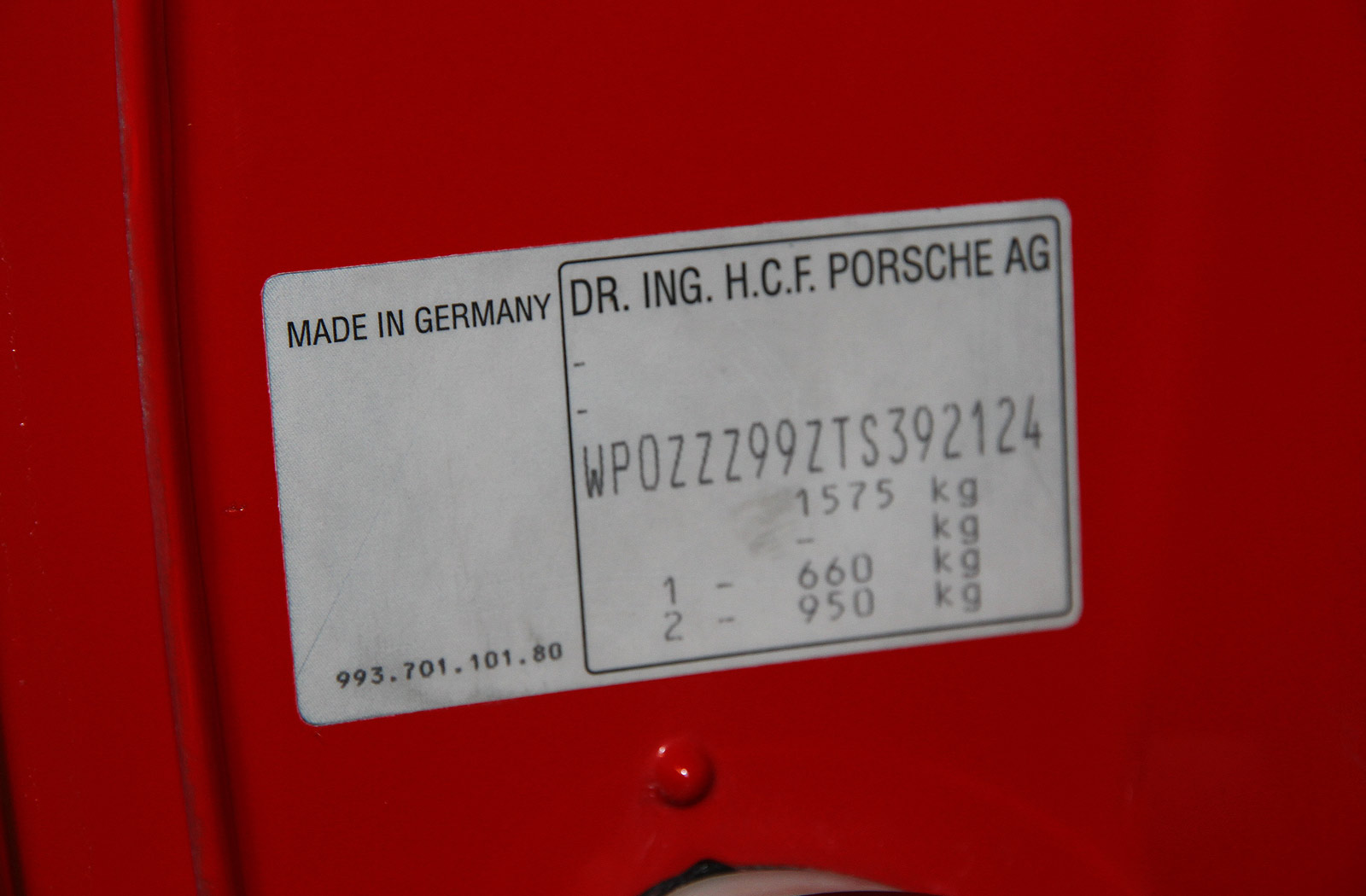
VIN on a 1996 Porsche 911 GT2 (993)

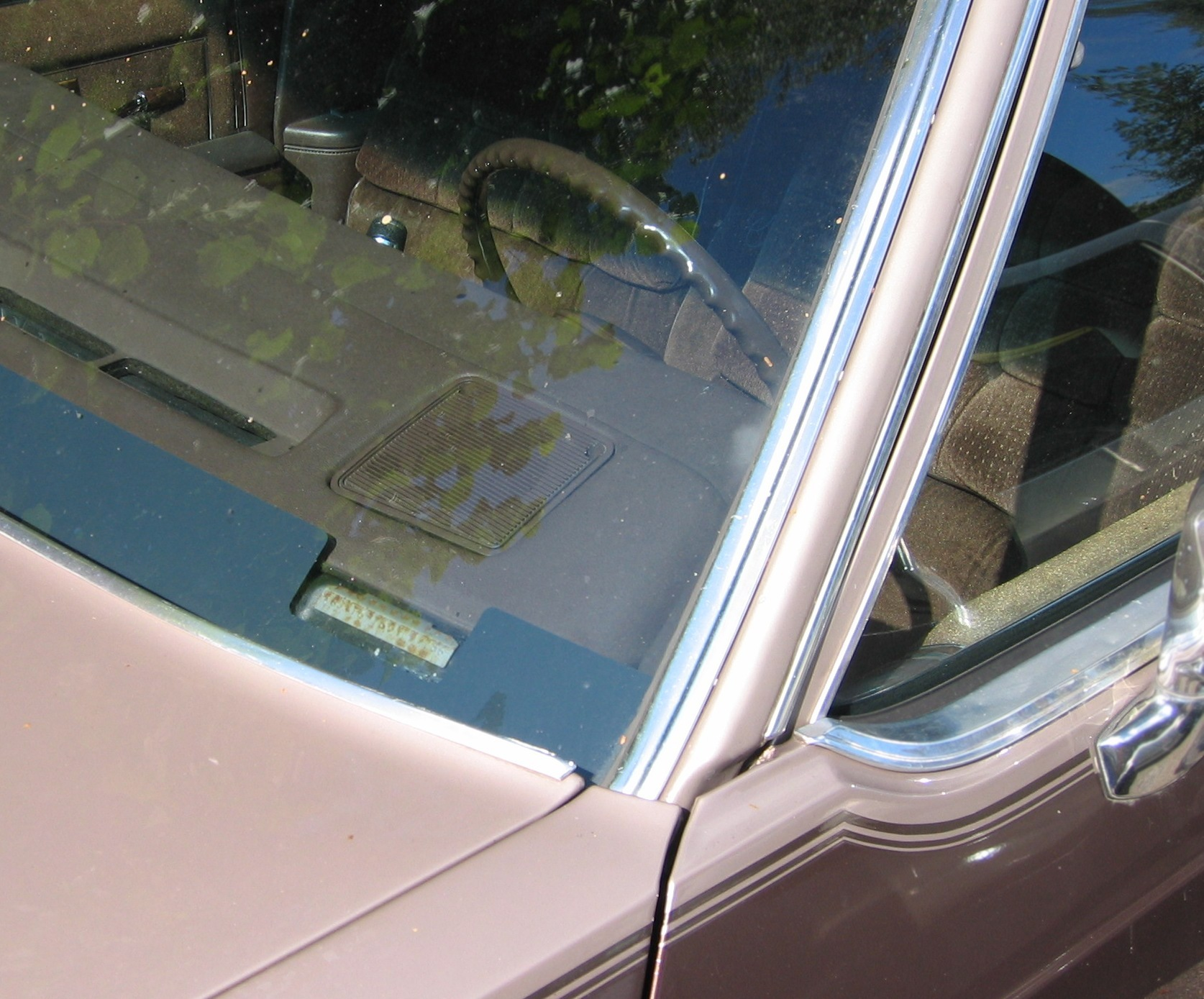
VIN visible in the windscreen

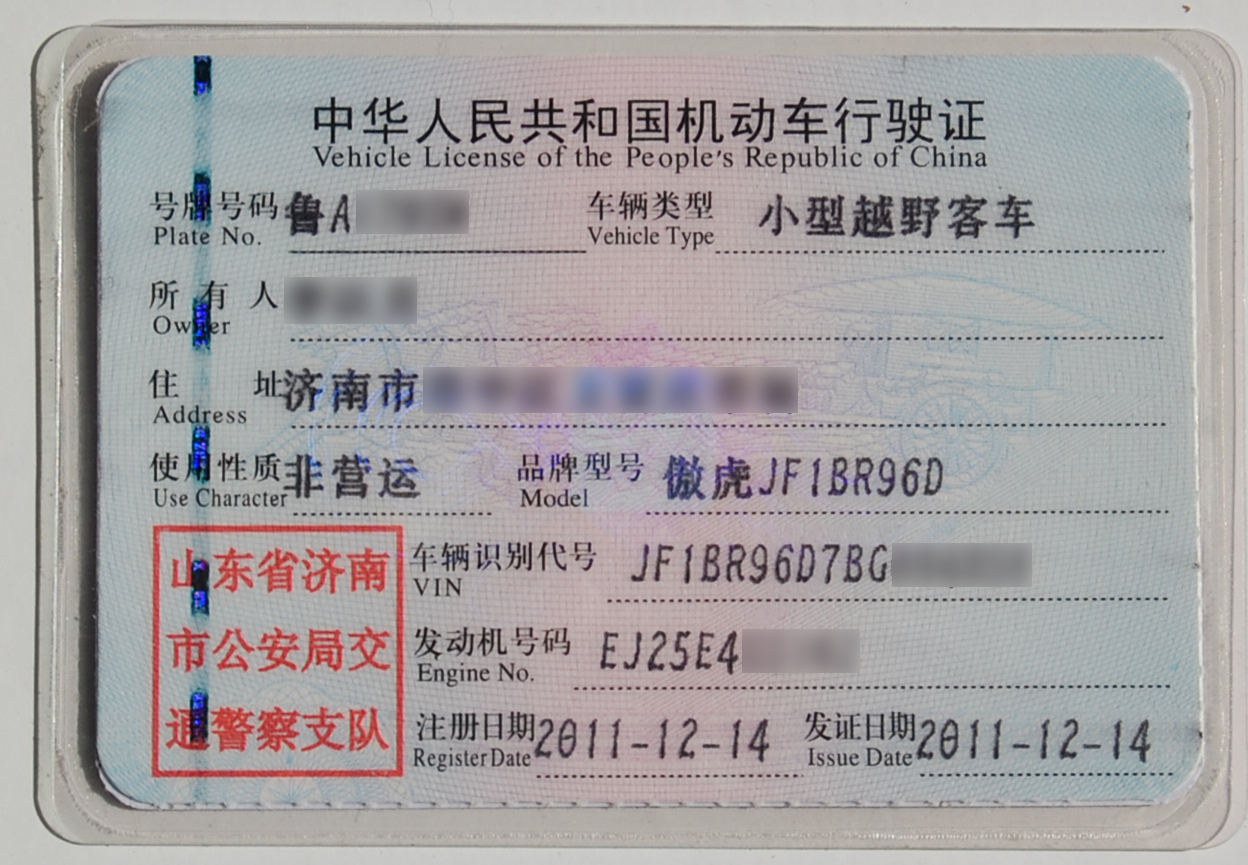
VIN recorded on a Chinese vehicle licence

A vehicle identification number (VIN; also called a chassis number or frame number) is a unique code, including a serial number, used by the automotive industry to identify individual motor vehicles, towed vehicles, motorcycles, scooters and mopeds, as defined by the International Organization for Standardization in ISO 3779 (content and structure) and ISO 4030 (location and attachment).

There are vehicle history services in several countries that help potential car owners use VINs to find vehicles that are defective or have been written off.

== History ==
VINs were first used in 1954 in the United States. From 1954 to 1965, there was no accepted standard for these numbers, so different manufacturers and even divisions within a manufacturer used different formats. Many were little more than a serial number. Starting in January 1966 the US government mandated that a 13-character VIN be used. This specification was phased in over several years. US manufacturers used them starting in January 1966; by January 1, 1969, all cars sold in the US were required to have the 13-character VIN. The 1966 US specification stated only that the year of manufacture, the engine type, and a unique six-digit number (making up the last six characters) were required—the individual manufacturers could use the remaining five spaces for whatever they liked. This was not much better than what was in use by some US manufacturers before 1966.

In 1981, the National Highway Traffic Safety Administration of the United States standardized the format. It required all on-road vehicles sold to contain a 17-character VIN, which does not include the letters O (o), I (i), U (u) or Q (q) (to avoid confusion with numerals 0, 1, and 9). This was largely based on the ISO 3779 standard, but is more stringent.

After the introduction of the ISO standard, the manufacturers which produced vehicles for the American market very quickly adjusted to this standard. ISO introduced recommendations for applying the VIN standard and its structure, and the VIN was also used in Europe. However, the sets of information contained in it were introduced gradually. For example, Volkswagen started to encode bigger chunks of information during 1995–1997, and the control digit during 2009–2015 for selected models from the group. The VIN control digit is also used, although not in all brand-models. In the European vehicles, it can be found e.g. in Audi A1.

== Classification ==
There are at least four competing standards used to calculate the VIN.

- FMVSS 115, Part 565: Used in United States and Canada
- ISO 3779: Used in Europe and many other parts of the world
- SAE J853: Very similar to the ISO standard
- ADR 61/2 used in Australia, referring to ISO 3779 and 3780

== Components ==
Modern VINs are based on two related standards, originally issued by the International Organization for Standardization (ISO) in 1979 and 1980: ISO 3779 and ISO 3780, respectively. Compatible but different implementations of these ISO standards have been adopted by the European Union and the United States.

The VIN consists of 17 characters, and only uses capital letters (excluding I, O and Q) and digits (0-9). It comprises the following sections:

| Standard | 1 | 2 | 3 | 4 | 5 | 6 | 7 | 8 | 9 | 10 | 11 | 12 | 13 | 14 | 15 | 16 | 17 |
| ISO 3779 | World manufacturer identifier | | | Vehicle descriptor section | | | | | | Vehicle identifier section | | | | | | | |
| European Union more than 500 vehicles/year | World manufacturer identifier | | | Indication of "the general characteristics of the vehicle"(VDS) | | | | | | Indication that provides "clear identification of a particular vehicle"(VIS) | | | | | | | |
| European Union 500 or fewer vehicles/year | World manufacturer identifier | | 9 | Indication of "the general characteristics of the vehicle" | | | | | | VIS(2of5) | | Manufacturer identifier | | | VIS(3of5) | | |
| North America more than 2,000 vehicles/year | World manufacturer identifier | | | Vehicle attributes | | | | | Check digit | Model year | Plant code | Sequential number | | | | | |
| North America 2,000 or fewer vehicles/year | World manufacturer identifier | | 9 | Vehicle attributes | | | | | Check digit | Model year | Plant code | Manufacturer identifier | | | Sequential number | | |

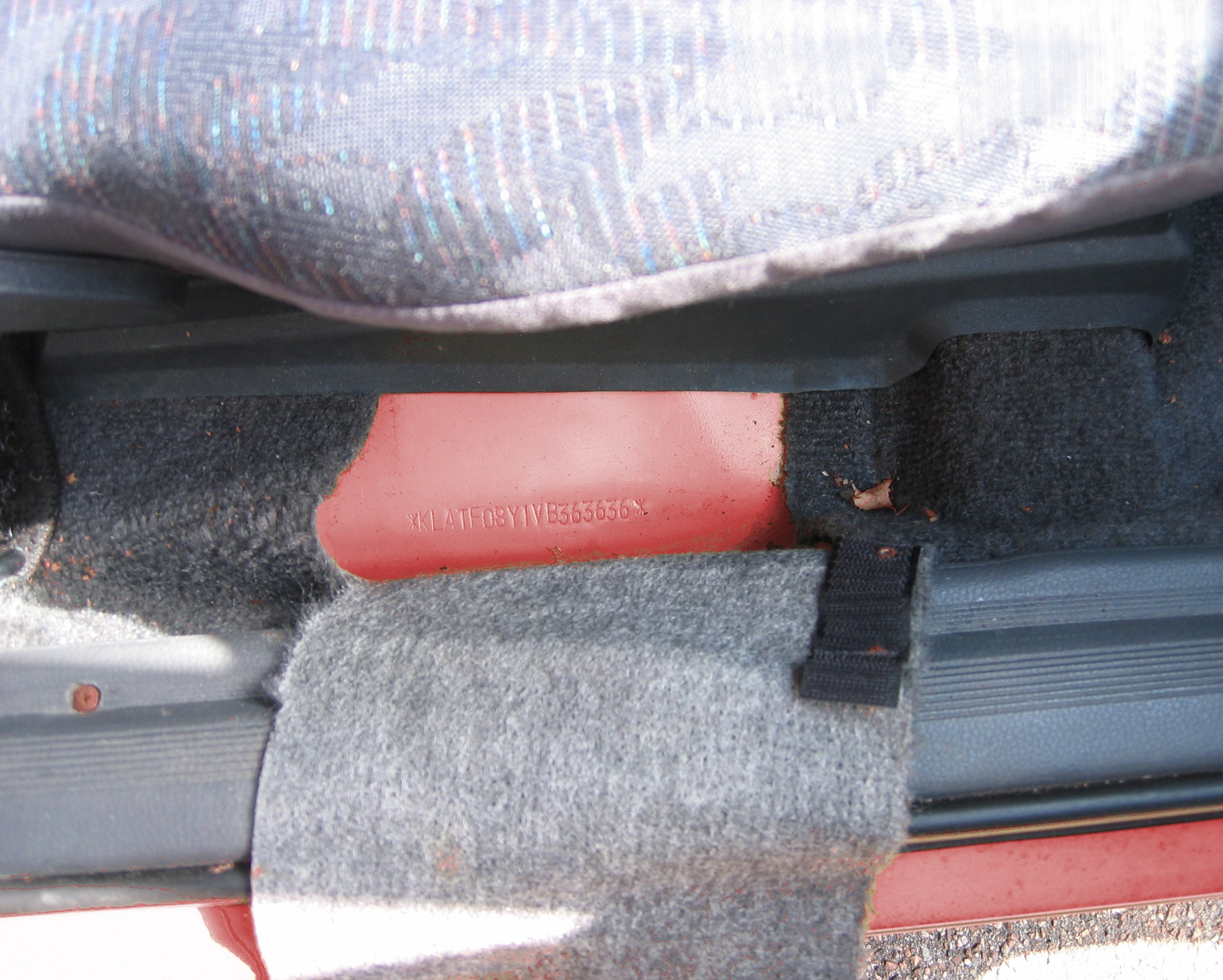
VIN in a GM-T-Platform body next to a passenger seat

=== World manufacturer identifier ===
The first three characters uniquely identify the manufacturer of the vehicle using the world manufacturer identifier or WMI code. A manufacturer who builds fewer than 1,000 vehicles per year uses a 9 as the third digit, and the 12th, 13th and 14th position of the VIN for a second part of the identification. Some manufacturers use the third character as a code for a vehicle category (e.g., bus or truck), a division within a manufacturer, or both. For example, within 1G (assigned to General Motors in the United States), 1G1 represents Chevrolet passenger cars; 1G2, Pontiac passenger cars; and 1GC, Chevrolet trucks.

The Society of Automotive Engineers (SAE) in the US assigns WMIs to countries and manufacturers.

The first character of the WMI is typically the region in which the manufacturer is located. In practice, each is assigned to a country of manufacture, although in Europe the country where the continental headquarters is located can assign the WMI to all vehicles produced in that region. (Example: When Adam Opel AG was still with General Motors, Opel/Vauxhall cars designed in that era used to carry a "German" WMI (e.g. W0L, W0V), because Adam Opel AG was based in Rüsselsheim, Germany, no matter if vehicles were produced in Germany, Spain, the United Kingdom, Poland or South Korea. When Opel changed hands and became part of PSA, this changed for newer models, which obtained "French" WMIs.)

Company mergers and acquisitions can lead to seemingly confusing allocations. For instance, Stellantis, the result of the merger of PSA (France) and FCA (Italy), is technically a Dutch corporation headquartered in Amsterdam. VINs of European-made vehicles or their brands, though, still carry WMIs from France and Italy. Additionally, it may not be immediately obvious what particular local subsidiary of the corporation manages type approvals of vehicles and application for WMIs, since this does not necessarily depend on the perceived country association of the respective brand. For example, in at least one case, a model that was newly released years after the merger by an Italian brand (ex-FCA) carries VINs with new French WMIs (the 2024 Lancia Ypsilon – incidentally manufactured in Spain). It is to be expected that assignment policies of this kind, often for unpublished reasons, can be found at other manufacturers as well.

In the notation below, assume that letters precede numbers and that zero is the last number. For example, 8X–82 denotes the range 8X, 8Y, 8Z, 81, 82, excluding 80.

==== Country or region codes ====
As of April 2019, ISO specifies the following codes per country:

| A–C = Africa | H–R = Asia | E, S–Z = Europe | 1–5, 7 = North America | 6 = Oceania | 8–9 = South America |
|---|---|---|---|---|---|
| AA-AH South Africa; AJ-AK Côte d'Ivoire; AL-AM Lesotho; AN-AP Botswana; AR-AS Namibia; AT-AU Madagascar; AV-AW Mauritius; AX-AY Tunisia; AZ-A1 Cyprus; A2-A3 Zimbabwe; A4-A5 Mozambique; BA-BB Angola; BC Ethiopia; BF-BG Kenya; BH Rwanda; BL Nigeria; BR Algeria; BT Swaziland; BU Uganda; B3-B4 Libya; CA-CB Egypt; CF-CG Morocco; CL-CM Zambia | H China; J Japan; KF-KH Israel; KL-KR South Korea; KS-KT Jordan; K1-K3 South Korea; K5 Kyrgyzstan; L China; MA-ME India; MF-MK Indonesia; ML-MR Thailand; MS Myanmar; MU Mongolia; MX Kazakhstan; MY-M0 India; NA-NE Iran; NF-NG Pakistan; NJ Iraq; NL-NR Turkey; NS-NT Uzbekistan; NV Azerbaijan; NX Tajikistan; NY Armenia; N1-N5 Iran; N7-N8 Turkey; PA-PC Philippines; PF-PG Singapore; PL-PR Malaysia; PS-PT Bangladesh; PV Cambodia; P5-P0 India; RA-RB United Arab Emirates; RF-RK Taiwan; RL-RN Vietnam; RP Laos; RS-RT Saudi Arabia; R1-R7 Hong Kong | E Russia; SA-SM United Kingdom; SN-ST Germany (former East Germany); SU-SZ Poland; S1-S2 Latvia; S3 Georgia; S4 Iceland; TA-TH Switzerland; TJ-TP Czech Republic; TR-TV Hungary; TW-T2 Portugal; T3-T5 Serbia; T6 Andorra; T7-T8 Netherlands; UA-UC Spain; UH-UM Denmark; UN-UR Ireland; UU-UX Romania; U1-U2 North Macedonia; U5-U7 Slovakia; U8-U0 Bosnia and Herzegovina; VA-VE Austria; VF-VR France; VS-VW Spain; VX-V2 France; V3-V5 Croatia; V6-V8 Estonia; W Germany (former West Germany); XA-XC Bulgaria; XD-XE Russia; XF-XH Greece; XJ-XK Russia; XL-XR Netherlands; XS-XW Russia (former USSR); XX-XY Luxembourg; XZ-X1 Russia; YA-YE Belgium; YF-YK Finland; YN Malta; YS-YW Sweden; YX-Y2 Norway; Y3-Y5 Belarus; Y6-Y9 Ukraine; ZA-ZU Italy; ZX-ZZ Slovenia; Z1 San Marino; Z3-Z5 Lithuania; Z6-Z0 Russia | 1 United States; 2 Canada; 3A-3X Mexico; 34 Nicaragua; 35 Dominican Republic; 36 Honduras; 37 Panama; 38-39 Puerto Rico; 4 United States; 5 United States; 7 United States | 6 Australia; 6Y-61 New Zealand | 8A-8E Argentina; 8F-8G Chile; 8L-8N Ecuador; 8S-8W Peru; 8X-8Z Venezuela; 82 Bolivia; 84 Costa Rica; 9A-9E Brazil; 9F-9G Colombia; 9S-9V Uruguay; 91–90 Brazil |

=== Vehicle descriptor section ===
The fourth to ninth positions in the VIN are the vehicle descriptor section or VDS. This is used, according to local regulations, to identify the vehicle type, and may include information on the automobile platform used, the model, and the body style. Each manufacturer has a unique system for using this field. Most manufacturers since the 1980s have used the eighth digit to identify the engine type whenever there is more than one engine choice for the vehicle. Example: for the 2007 Chevrolet Corvette (C6 Vette), U is for a 6.0-liter V8 engine, and E is for a 7.0-liter V8.

==== North American check digits ====
One element that is inconsistent is the use of position nine as a check digit, compulsory for vehicles in North America and China, but not so in Europe.

=== Vehicle identifier section ===
The 10th to 17th positions are used as the vehicle identifier section or VIS. This is used by the manufacturer to identify the individual vehicle in question. This may include information on options installed or engine and transmission choices, but often is a simple sequential number.

==== Model year encoding ====
The North American implementation of the VIS uses the 10th digit to encode the model year of the vehicle. Besides the three letters that are not allowed in the VIN itself (I, O and Q), the letters U and Z and the digit 0 are not used for the model year code. Outside of North America the 10th digit is usually 0.

The year 1980 was encoded by some manufacturers, especially General Motors and Chrysler, as "A" (since the 17-digit VIN was not mandatory until 1981, and the "A" or zero was in the manufacturer's pre-1981 placement in the VIN), yet Ford and AMC still used a zero for 1980. Subsequent years increment through the allowed letters, so that "Y" represents the year 2000. 2001 to 2009 are encoded as the digits 1 to 9, and subsequent years are encoded as "A", "B", "C", etc.

| Code | Year | Code | Year | Code | Year | Code | Year | Code | Year | Code | Year |
|---|---|---|---|---|---|---|---|---|---|---|---|
| A | 1980 | L | 1990 | Y | 2000 | A | 2010 | L | 2020 | Y | 2030 |
| B | 1981 | M | 1991 | 1 | 2001 | B | 2011 | M | 2021 | 1 | 2031 |
| C | 1982 | N | 1992 | 2 | 2002 | C | 2012 | N | 2022 | 2 | 2032 |
| D | 1983 | P | 1993 | 3 | 2003 | D | 2013 | P | 2023 | 3 | 2033 |
| E | 1984 | R | 1994 | 4 | 2004 | E | 2014 | R | 2024 | 4 | 2034 |
| F | 1985 | S | 1995 | 5 | 2005 | F | 2015 | S | 2025 | 5 | 2035 |
| G | 1986 | T | 1996 | 6 | 2006 | G | 2016 | T | 2026 | 6 | 2036 |
| H | 1987 | V | 1997 | 7 | 2007 | H | 2017 | V | 2027 | 7 | 2037 |
| J | 1988 | W | 1998 | 8 | 2008 | J | 2018 | W | 2028 | 8 | 2038 |
| K | 1989 | X | 1999 | 9 | 2009 | K | 2019 | X | 2029 | 9 | 2039 |

On April 30, 2008, the US National Highway Traffic Safety Administration adopted a final rule amending 49 CFR Part 565, "so that the current 17 character vehicle identification number (VIN) system, which has been in place for almost 30 years, can continue in use for at least another 30 years", in the process making several changes to the VIN requirements applicable to all motor vehicles manufactured for sale in the United States. There were three notable changes to the VIN structure that affect VIN deciphering systems:

- The make may only be identified after looking at positions one through three and another position, as determined by the manufacturer in the second section or fourth to eighth segment of the VIN.
- In order to identify the exact year in passenger cars and multipurpose passenger vehicles with a GVWR of 10,000 or less, one must read position 7 as well as position 10. For passenger cars, and for multipurpose passenger vehicles and trucks with a gross vehicle weight rating of 10,000 lb (4,500 kg) or less, if position seven is numeric, the model year in position 10 of the VIN refers to a year in the range 1980–2009. If position seven is alphabetic, the model year in position 10 of VIN refers to a year in the range 2010–2039.
- The model year for vehicles with a GVWR greater than 10,000 lb (4,500 kg), as well as buses, motorcycles, trailers and low-speed vehicles, may no longer be identified within a 30-year range. VIN characters 1–8 and 10 that were assigned from 1980 to 2009 can be repeated beginning with the 2010 model year.

==== Plant code ====
Compulsory in North America and China is the use of the 11th character to identify the assembly plant at which the vehicle was built. Each manufacturer has its own set of plant codes.

==== Production number ====
In the United States and China, the 12th to 17th digits are the vehicle's serial or production number. This is unique to each vehicle, and every manufacturer uses its own sequence.

== Check-digit calculation ==
A check-digit validation is used for all road vehicles sold in the United States and Canada.

When trying to validate a VIN with a check digit, first either (a) remove the check digit for the purpose of calculation or (b) use a weight of zero (see below) to cancel it out. The original value of the check digit is then compared with the calculated value. If the calculated value is 0–9, the check digit must match the calculated value. If the calculated value is 10, the check digit must be X. If the two values do not match (and there was no error in the calculation), then there is a mistake in the VIN. However, a match does not prove the VIN is correct, because there is still a 1/11 chance that any two distinct VINs have a matching check digit: for example, the valid VINs 5GZCZ43D13S812715 (correct with leading five) and SGZCZ43D13S812715 (incorrect with leading character "S"). The VINs in the Porsche image, WP0ZZZ99ZTS392124, and the GM-T body image, KLATF08Y1VB363636, do not pass the North American check-digit verification.

=== Transliterating the numbers ===
Transliteration consists of removing all of the letters, and replacing them with their appropriate numerical counterparts. These numerical alternatives (based on IBM's EBCDIC) are in the following chart. I, O, and Q are not allowed in a valid VIN. Numerical digits use their own values.

Transliteration key: values for VIN decoding
| A: 1 | B: 2 | C: 3 | D: 4 | E: 5 | F: 6 | G: 7 | H: 8 | —N/a |
| J: 1 | K: 2 | L: 3 | M: 4 | N: 5 | —N/a | P: 7 | —N/a | R: 9 |
| —N/a | S: 2 | T: 3 | U: 4 | V: 5 | W: 6 | X: 7 | Y: 8 | Z: 9 |

S is 2, and not 1. There is no left-alignment linearity.

=== Weights used in calculation ===
The following is the weight factor for each position in the VIN. The 9th position is that of the check digit. It has been substituted with a 0, which will cancel it out in the multiplication step.

Weight factor table
| Position | 1 | 2 | 3 | 4 | 5 | 6 | 7 | 8 | 9 | 10 | 11 | 12 | 13 | 14 | 15 | 16 | 17 |
| Weight | 8 | 7 | 6 | 5 | 4 | 3 | 2 | 10 | 0 | 9 | 8 | 7 | 6 | 5 | 4 | 3 | 2 |

=== Worked example ===
Consider the hypothetical VIN 1M8GDM9A_KP042788, where the underscore will be the check digit.

| VIN | 1 | M | 8 | G | D | M | 9 | A | | K | P | 0 | 4 | 2 | 7 | 8 | 8 |
| Value | 1 | 4 | 8 | 7 | 4 | 4 | 9 | 1 | 0 | 2 | 7 | 0 | 4 | 2 | 7 | 8 | 8 |
| Weight | 8 | 7 | 6 | 5 | 4 | 3 | 2 | 10 | 0 | 9 | 8 | 7 | 6 | 5 | 4 | 3 | 2 |
| Products | 8 | 28 | 48 | 35 | 16 | 12 | 18 | 10 | 0 | 18 | 56 | 0 | 24 | 10 | 28 | 24 | 16 |

1. The VIN's value is calculated from the above transliteration table. This number is used in the rest of the calculation.
2. Copy the weights from the weight factor row above.
3. The products row is the result of the multiplication of the columns in the Value and Weight rows.
4. The products (8, 28, 48, 35 ... 24, 16) are all added together to yield a sum, 351.
5. Find the remainder after dividing by 11
  - 351 MOD 11 = 10
  - 351 ÷ 11 = 31 10/11
6. The remainder is the check digit. If the remainder is 10, the check digit is X. In this example, the remainder is 10, so the check digit is transliterated as X.

With a check digit of X, the VIN 1M8GDM9A_KP042788 is written 1M8GDM9AXKP042788.

A VIN with straight-ones (seventeen consecutive 1s) has the nice feature that its check digit 1 matches the calculated value 1. This is because a value of one multiplied by 89 (sum of weights) is 89, and 89 divided by 11 is 8 with remainder 1/11; thus 1 is the check digit. This is a way to test a VIN-check algorithm.

== VIN scanning ==
The VIN is marked in multiple locations: normally in the lower corner of the windscreen on the driver's side, under the bonnet next to the latch, at the front end of the vehicle frame, and inside the door pillar on the driver's side. On newer vehicles VINs may be optically read with barcode scanners or digital cameras, or digitally read via OBD-II. There are smartphone applications that can pass the VIN to websites to decode the VIN.

== List of common WMI ==
The Society of Automotive Engineers (SAE) assigns the WMI (world manufacturer identifier) to countries and manufacturers. The following list shows a selection of world manufacturer codes.

| WMI | Country | Manufacturer |
=== Africa ===
| AAA | South Africa | Audi South Africa made by Volkswagen of South Africa |
| AAK | South Africa | FAW Vehicle Manufacturers SA (PTY) Ltd. |
| AAM | South Africa | MAN Automotive (South Africa) (Pty) Ltd. includes VW Truck & Bus |
| AAV | South Africa | Volkswagen of South Africa |
| ABJ | South Africa | Mitsubishi Colt & Triton pickups made by Mercedes-Benz South Africa 1994–2011 |
| ABJ | South Africa | Mitsubishi Fuso made by Daimler Trucks & Buses Southern Africa |
| ABM | South Africa | BMW Southern Africa |
| ACV | South Africa | Isuzu Motors South Africa 2018- |
| AC5 | South Africa | Hyundai Automotive South Africa (cars) |
| ADD | South Africa | UD Trucks Southern Africa (Pty) Ltd |
| ADM | South Africa | General Motors South Africa includes Isuzu through 2018 |
| ADN | South Africa | Nissan South Africa (Pty) Ltd |
| ADR | South Africa | Renault Sandero made by Nissan South Africa (Pty) Ltd |
| ADX | South Africa | Tata Automobile Corporation (SA) Ltd. |
| AFA | South Africa | Ford Motor Company of Southern Africa & Samcor |
| AFB | South Africa | Mazda BT-50 made by Ford Motor Company of Southern Africa |
| AHH | South Africa | Hino South Africa |
| AHM | South Africa | Honda Ballade made by Mercedes-Benz South Africa 1982–2000 |
| AHT | South Africa | Toyota South Africa Motors |
| BAB | | BMW cars 1986-2019 |
| BF9 | Kenya | KIBO Motorcycles |
| BRC | Algeria | TIRSAM |
| BRY | Algeria | Stellantis el Djazaïr |
| CL9 | Tunisia | Wallyscar |
| CAG CAH | Egypt | MAC for Mobility Manufacturing (Mansour Automotive Group) |
| DA1 DA4 | Egypt | Arab American Vehicles |
| DAA | Egypt | Fiat Auto Egypt Industrial Co |
| DAB | Egypt | BMW Egypt SKD |
| DF9 | Morocco | Laraki |
| GA1 | Madagascar | Renault /SOMACOA - Société Malgache de Construction Automobile |
=== Asia ===
| J81 | Japan | Chevrolet/Geo car made by Isuzu |
| J87 | Japan | Pontiac/Asüna car made by Isuzu for GM Canada |
| J8B J8C | Japan | Chevrolet commercial trucks made by Isuzu |
| J8D J8T | Japan | GMC commercial trucks made by Isuzu |
| J8Z | Japan | Chevrolet pickup truck made by Isuzu |
| JA3 | Japan | Mitsubishi car |
| JA4 | Japan | Mitsubishi MPV/SUV |
| JA7 | Japan | Mitsubishi truck |
| JAA | Japan | Isuzu truck |
| JAB | Japan | Isuzu car |
| JAC | Japan | Isuzu SUV |
| JAE | Japan | Acura SLX made by Isuzu |
| JAL | Japan | Isuzu commercial trucks & Chevrolet commercial trucks made by Isuzu 2016+ & Hino S-series truck made by Isuzu |
| JAM | Japan | Isuzu commercial trucks |
| JB3 | Japan | Dodge car made by Mitsubishi Motors |
| JB4 | Japan | Dodge MPV/SUV made by Mitsubishi Motors |
| JB7 | Japan | Dodge truck made by Mitsubishi Motors |
| JC0 | Japan | Ford brand cars made by Mazda |
| JC1 | Japan | Fiat 124 Spider made by Mazda |
| JC2 | Japan | Ford Courier made by Mazda |
| JD1 | Japan | Daihatsu car |
| JD2 | Japan | Daihatsu SUV |
| JD4 | Japan | Daihatsu truck |
| JDA | Japan | Daihatsu |
| JE3 | Japan | Eagle car made by Mitsubishi Motors |
| JE4 | Japan | Mitsubishi |
| JF1 | Japan | Subaru – Fuji Heavy Industries car |
| JF2 | Japan | Subaru – Fuji Heavy Industries SUV |
| JF3 | Japan | Subaru – Fuji Heavy Industries truck |
| JF4 | Japan | Saab 9-2X made by Subaru |
| JG1 | Japan | Chevrolet/Geo car made by Suzuki |
| JG7 | Japan | Pontiac/Asuna car made by Suzuki for GM Canada |
| JGC | Japan | Chevrolet/Geo SUV made by Suzuki |
| JGT | Japan | GMC SUV made by Suzuki for GM Canada |
| JH2 | Japan | Honda motorcycle/ATV |
| JH3 | Japan | Honda ATV |
| JH4 | Japan | Acura car |
| JHA JHB | Japan | Hino |
| JHD JHF JHH | Japan | Hino |
| JHL | Japan | Honda MPV/SUV |
| JHM | Japan | Honda car |
| JJ3 | Japan | Chrysler car made by Mitsubishi Motors |
| JK8 | Japan | Suzuki QUV620F UTV made by Kawasaki |
| JKA JKB | Japan | Kawasaki |
| JKS | Japan | Suzuki Marauder 1600/Boulevard M95 motorcycle made by Kawasaki |
| JL5 JL6 | Japan | Mitsubishi FUSO Truck & Bus Corp |
| JLF | Japan | Mitsubishi FUSO Truck & Bus Corp |
| JLS | Japan | Sterling Trucks 360 made by Mitsubishi FUSO Truck & Bus Corp |
| JM0 | Japan | Mazda for Oceania export |
| JM1 | Japan | Mazda car |
| JM2 | Japan | Mazda truck |
| JM3 | Japan | Mazda MPV/SUV |
| JM6 | Japan | Mazda |
| JM7 | Japan | Mazda |
| JMA JMB | Japan | Mitsubishi |
| JMF | Japan | Mitsubishi |
| JMY | Japan | Mitsubishi |
| JMZ | Japan | Mazda for Europe export |
| JN | Japan | Nissan |
| JN1 | Japan | Nissan car & Infiniti car |
| JN3 | Japan | Nissan incomplete vehicle |
| JN6 | Japan | Nissan truck |
| JN8 | Japan | Nissan MPV/SUV & Infiniti SUV |
| JNA | Japan | Nissan Diesel/UD Trucks incomplete vehicle |
| JNC | Japan | Nissan Diesel/UD Trucks |
| JNE | Japan | Nissan Diesel/UD Trucks truck |
| JNK | Japan | Infiniti car |
| JNR | Japan | Infiniti SUV |
| JNX | Japan | Infiniti incomplete vehicle |
| JP3 | Japan | Plymouth car made by Mitsubishi Motors |
| JP4 | Japan | Plymouth MPV/SUV made by Mitsubishi Motors |
| JP7 | Japan | Plymouth truck made by Mitsubishi Motors |
| JPC | Japan | Nissan Diesel/UD Trucks |
| JR2 | Japan | Isuzu Oasis made by Honda |
| JS | Japan | Suzuki |
| JS1 | Japan | Suzuki motorcycle & Kawasaki KLX400S/KLX400SR motorcycle made by Suzuki |
| JS2 | Japan | Suzuki car |
| JS3 | Japan | Suzuki SUV |
| JSA | Japan | Kawasaki KFX400 ATV made by Suzuki |
| JSK | Japan | Kawasaki KLX125/KLX125L motorcycle made by Suzuki |
| JSL | Japan | Kawasaki KFX400 ATV made by Suzuki |
| JT | Japan | Toyota |
| JT2 | Japan | Toyota car |
| JT3 | Japan | Toyota MPV/SUV |
| JT4 | Japan | Toyota truck |
| JT5 | Japan | Toyota incomplete vehicle |
| JT6 | Japan | Lexus SUV |
| JT8 | Japan | Lexus car |
| JTD | Japan | Toyota car |
| JTE | Japan | Toyota MPV/SUV |
| JTF | Japan | Toyota van/truck |
| JTG | Japan | Toyota MPV/bus |
| JTH | Japan | Lexus car |
| JTJ | Japan | Lexus SUV |
| JTK | Japan | Toyota car |
| JTL | Japan | Toyota SUV |
| JTM | Japan | Toyota SUV |
| JTN | Japan | Toyota car |
| JW6 | Japan | Mitsubishi FUSO division of Mitsubishi Motors (through mid 2003) |
| JY | Japan | Yamaha Motor |
| JY3 | Japan | Yamaha Motor 3-wheel ATV |
| JY4 | Japan | Yamaha Motor 4-wheel ATV |
| JYA | Japan | Yamaha Motor motorcycles |
| JYE | Japan | Yamaha Motor snowmobile |
| KAL | Sri Lanka | Lanka Ashok Leyland |
| KAA | Sri Lanka | RS Automotive |
| KA1 | Sri Lanka | KEWR Technologies |
| KF3 | Israel | Merkavim |
| KF6 | Israel | Automotive Industries, Ltd. |
| KF9 004 | Israel | Tomcar |
| KLA | South Korea | Daewoo/GM Korea |
| KLT KLU | South Korea | Tata Daewoo |
| KL1 | South Korea | GM Daewoo/GM Korea Chevrolet car |
| KL2 | South Korea | Daewoo/GM Daewoo Pontiac |
| KL3 | South Korea | GM Daewoo/GM Korea Holden |
| KL4 | South Korea | GM Korea Buick |
| KL5 | South Korea | GM Daewoo Suzuki |
| KL6 | South Korea | GM Daewoo GMC |
| KL7 | South Korea | Daewoo GM Canada brands: Passport, Asuna (Pre-2000) |
| KL7 | South Korea | GM Daewoo/GM Korea Chevrolet MPV/SUV (Post-2000) |
| KL8 | South Korea | GM Daewoo/GM Korea Chevrolet car (Spark) |
| KMA | South Korea | Asia Motors |
| KME | South Korea | Hyundai commercial truck |
| KMF | South Korea | Hyundai van & commercial truck & Bering Truck |
| KMH | South Korea | Hyundai car |
| KMJ | South Korea | Hyundai bus & minibus |
| KMT | South Korea | Genesis Motor car |
| KMU | South Korea | Genesis Motor SUV |
| KMY | South Korea | Daelim Motor Company, Ltd/DNA Motors Co., Ltd. |
| KM4 | South Korea | Hyosung Motors/S&T Motors/KR Motors |
| KM8 | South Korea | Hyundai SUV |
| KNA KNC KNE | South Korea | Kia car |
| KND | South Korea | Kia SUV/MPV & Hyundai Entourage |
| KNG | South Korea | Kia Granbird |
| KNJ | South Korea | Ford Festiva & Aspire |
| KNM | South Korea | Renault Samsung Motors & Nissan Rogue made by Renault Samsung Motors |
| KPA | South Korea | KG Mobility pickup |
| KPB | South Korea | KG Mobility car |
| KM9 | South Korea | Edison Motors/KG Mobility Commercial Buses |
| KPH | South Korea | Mitsubishi Precis |
| KPT | South Korea | KG Mobility SUV/MPV |
| L1C | China | Hubei Huawei Special-Purpose Automobile |
| L2C | China | Chery Jaguar Land Rover |
| L5Y | China | Znen Taizhou Zhongneng Motorcycle Co. Ltd. |
| L6T | China | Geely |
| L8A | China | Jinhua Youngman Automobile Manufacturing Co., Ltd. |
| L8Y | China | Zhejiang Jonway Motorcycle Manufacturing Co., Ltd. |
| L9N | China | Zhejiang Taotao Vehicles Co., Ltd. |
| LA6 | China | King Long |
| LA9 LC0 | China | BYD Auto |
| LAL | China | Sundiro Honda Motorcycle Co., Ltd. |
| LB1 | China | Fujian Benz |
| LB2 | China | Geely motorcycle |
| LB3 | China | Geely |
| LBB | China | Qianjiang Motorcycle & Benelli |
| LBE | China | Beijing Hyundai/Hyundai Sonata Taxi (DT23 for South Korean Market) |
| LBP | China | Chongqing Jianshe Yamaha Motor Co. Ltd. |
| LBV | China | BMW Brilliance |
| LC0 | China | BYD Auto Industry Co. Ltd. |
| LC2 | China | Changzhou Kwang Yang Motor Co., Ltd. |
| LC6 | China | Changzhou Haojue Suzuki Motorcycle Co. Ltd. |
| LCE | China | CF Moto by Chunfeng Holding Group Hangzhou Motorcycles Manufacturing Co., Ltd. |
| LCR | China | Gonow |
| LDC | China | Dongfeng Peugeot-Citroën |
| LDK | China | FAW Bus (Dalian) Co., Ltd. |
| LDN | China | Soueast |
| LDY | China | Zhongtong Bus |
| LE4 | China | Beijing Benz & Beijing Benz-Daimler Chrysler Automotive Co., Ltd. |
| LEF | China | JMC |
| LET | China | Jiangxi Isuzu |
| LF3 | China | Lifan motorcycle |
| LFB | China | FAW Jilin |
| LFM | China | FAW Toyota |
| LFN | China | FAW Bus (Wuxi) Co., Ltd. |
| LFP | China | FAW Car |
| LFV | China | FAW-Volkswagen |
| LGA | China | Dongfeng Commercial Vehicle Co., Ltd. trucks |
| LGB | China | Dongfeng Nissan |
| LGC | China | Dongfeng Commercial Vehicle Co., Ltd. buses |
| LGG | China | Dongfeng Liuzhou Motor |
| LGJ | China | Dongfeng Fengshen (Aeolus) |
| LGL | China | Guilin Daewoo |
| LGW | China | Great Wall (Haval) |
| LGX | China | BYD Auto |
| LGZ | China | Guangzhou Denway Bus |
| LH1 | China | FAW Haima |
| LHG | China | Guangzhou Honda |
| LJ1 | China | JAC |
| LJ8 | China | Zotye Auto |
| LJC | China | Jincheng Corporation |
| LJD | China | Dongfeng Yueda Kia |
| LJN | China | Zhengzhou Nissan |
| LJS | China | Yaxing Coach |
| LJU | China | Shanghai Maple Automobile & Kandi |
| LJV | China | Sinotruk Chengdu Wangpai Commercial Vehicle Co., Ltd. |
| LJX | China | JMC Ford |
| LKC | China | Changhe |
| LKG | China | Youngman Lotus Automobile Co., Ltd. |
| LKL | China | Higer Bus |
| LKT | China | Yunnan Lifan Junma Vehicle Co., Ltd. commercial vehicles |
| LL3 | China | Xiamen Golden Dragon Bus Co. Ltd |
| LL6 | China | GAC Mitsubishi |
| LL8 | China | Jiangsu Linhai Yamaha Motor Co., Ltd. |
| LLC | China | Loncin Holdings |
| LLN | China | Qoros |
| LLV | China | Lifan |
| LM6 | China | SWM (automobiles) |
| LMG | China | GAC Trumpchi |
| LNB | China | BAIC Motor |
| LNP | China | NAC MG UK Limited & Nanjing Fiat Automobile |
| LNY | China | Yuejin |
| LPA | China | Changan PSA (DS Automobiles) |
| LPE | China | BYD Auto |
| LPS | China | Polestar |
| LRB | China | SAIC General Motors Buick |
| LRD | China | Beijing Foton Daimler Automotive Co., Ltd. Auman trucks |
| LRE | China | SAIC General Motors Cadillac |
| LRW | China | Tesla |
| LS5 | China | Changan Automobile & Changan Suzuki |
| LS7 | China | JMC Heavy Duty Vehicle |
| LSF | China | SAIC Maxus & Shanghai Sunwin Bus Corporation |
| LSG | China | SAIC General Motors Chevrolet |
| LSH | China | SAIC Maxus |
| LSJ | China | SAIC MG & SAIC Roewe |
| LSK | China | SAIC Maxus |
| LSV | China | SAIC Volkswagen |
| LSY | China | Brilliance & Jinbei GM |
| LTA | China | ZX Auto |
| LTN | China | Soueast built Chrysler & Dodge vehicles |
| LTV | China | FAW Toyota (Tianjin) |
| LUC | China | Honda Automobile (China) |
| LUD | China | Dongfeng Nissan Diesel Motor Co Ltd |
| LUX | China | Dongfeng Yulon Motor Co. Ltd |
| LVA LVB LVC | China | Foton Motor |
| LVF | China | Changhe Suzuki |
| LVG | China | GAC Toyota |
| LVH | China | Dongfeng Honda |
| LVM | China | Chery Commercial Vehicle |
| LVR | China | Changan Mazda |
| LVS | China | Changan Ford & Changan Ford Mazda |
| LVV | China | Chery |
| LVX | China | Landwind |
| LVY | China | Volvo Cars Daqing factory |
| LVZ | China | DFSK Motor |
| LWB | China | Wuyang Honda Motorcycle (Guangzhou) Co., Ltd. |
| LWL | China | Qingling Isuzu |
| LWV | China | GAC Fiat Chrysler |
| LXV | China | Beijing Borgward Automotive Co., Ltd. |
| LXY | China | Chongqing Shineray Motorcycle Co., Ltd. |
| LYB | China | Weichai (Yangzhou) Yaxing Automobile Co., Ltd. |
| LYM | China | Zhuzhou Jianshe Yamaha Motorcycle Co., Ltd. |
| LYV | China | Volvo Cars Chengdu factory & Luqiao factory |
| LZF | China | SAIC Iveco Hongyan |
| LZG | China | Shaanxi Automobile Group Shacman Bus |
| LZK | China | Sinotruk (CNHTC) Huanghe bus |
| LZS | China | Zongshen |
| LZU | China | Guangzhou Isuzu Bus |
| LZW | China | SAIC GM Wuling |
| LZY | China | Yutong |
| LZZ | China | Sinotruk (CNHTC) Howo, Sitrak |
| MA1 | India | Mahindra |
| MA3 | India | Maruti Suzuki India Limited |
| MA6 | India | General Motors India Pvt. Ltd. |
| MA7 | India | Hindustan Motors Ltd & Mitsubishi Motors models made by Hindustan Motors & Isuzu models made by Hindustan Motors |
| MAH | India | Fiat India Automobiles Pvt. Ltd |
| MAJ | India | Ford India |
| MAK | India | Honda Cars India |
| MAL | India | Hyundai Motor India |
| MAN | India | Eicher Polaris Multix |
| MAT | India | Tata Motors |
| MB1 | India | Ashok Leyland Ltd |
| MB8 | India | Suzuki Motorcycle India Limited |
| MBF | India | Royal Enfield |
| MBH | India | Nissan Pixo made by Maruti Suzuki India Limited |
| MBJ | India | Toyota Kirloskar Motor Pvt Ltd |
| MBK | India | MAN Trucks India Pvt. Ltd |
| MBL | India | Hero MotoCorp |
| MBU | India | Swaraj Vehicles Limited |
| MBV | India | Premier Automobiles Limited |
| MBX | India | Piaggio India Piaggio Ape |
| MBY | India | Asia Motor Works Ltd |
| MC1 | India | Force Motors Limited |
| MC2 | India | Eicher Motors Limited |
| MC4 | India | Dilip Chhabria Design Pvt Ltd |
| MCA | India | FCA India Automobiles Pvt. Ltd |
| MCB | India | General Motors India Pvt. Ltd. |
| MCD | India | Mahindra Two Wheelers |
| MCG | India | Atul Auto |
| MCL | India | International Cars And Motors Ltd |
| MD2 | India | Bajaj Auto Ltd & KTM and Husqvarna models built by Bajaj |
| MD6 | India | TVS Motor Company |
| MD7 | India | LML Ltd including Genuine Scooter Company Stella |
| MDE | India | Kinetic Engineering Limited |
| MDH | India | Nissan Motor India Pvt Ltd |
| MDT | India | Kerala Automobiles Limited |
| ME1 | India | India Yamaha Motor Pvt. Ltd |
| ME3 | India | Royal Enfield |
| ME4 | India | Honda Motorcycle and Scooter India |
| ME9 | India | BUYMYEV TECHNOLOGY PVT LTD |
| MEC | India | Daimler India Commercial Vehicles Pvt. Ltd. BharatBenz |
| MEE | India | Renault India Private Limited |
| MEG | India | Harley-Davidson India |
| MER | India | Benelli |
| MET | India | Piaggio India Vespa |
| MEX | India | Škoda Auto Volkswagen India Pvt. Ltd. 2015 on |
| P6W | India | Simple Energy |
| MYH | India | Ather Energy |
| MZ7 | India | MG Motor India Pvt. Ltd. |
| MZB | India | Kia India Pvt. Ltd. |
| MZD | India | Classic Legends Private Limited – Jawa |
| M3G | India | Isuzu Motors India |
| M6F | UM Lohia Two Wheelers Private Limited | |
| MH1 | Indonesia | PT Astra Honda Motor |
| MH3 | Indonesia | PT Yamaha Indonesia Motor Mfg. |
| MH4 | Indonesia | PT Kawasaki Motor Indonesia |
| MHF | Indonesia | PT Toyota Astra Motor |
| MHH | Indonesia | BMW cars 2003-2019 India |
| MHK | Indonesia | PT Astra Daihatsu Motor including Toyotas made by Astra Daihatsu |
| MHL | Indonesia | PT Mercedes-Benz Indonesia |
| MHR | Indonesia | PT Honda Prospect Motor |
| MHY | Indonesia | PT Suzuki Indomobil Motor |
| MJB | Indonesia | GM Indonesia |
| MK2 | Indonesia | Mitsubishi Motors Krama Yudha Indonesia |
| MK3 | Indonesia | PT SGMW Motor Indonesia Wuling |
| ML0 | Thailand | Ducati Motor (Thailand) Co., Ltd. |
| ML3 | Thailand | Mitsubishi Motors (Thailand) |
| ML5 | Thailand | Kawasaki Motors Enterprise Co. Ltd. (Thailand) |
| MLC | Thailand | Thai Suzuki Motor Co., Ltd. |
| MLE | Thailand | Thai Yamaha Motor Co., Ltd. |
| MLH | Thailand | Honda motorcycle |
| MLY | Thailand | Harley-Davidson |
| MM0 MM6 MM7 | Thailand | Mazda (Ford-Mazda AAT plant) |
| MM8 | Thailand | Mazda (Ford-Mazda AAT plant) |
| MMA MMB | Thailand | Mitsubishi Motors (Thailand) |
| MMC MMD | Thailand | Mitsubishi Motors (Thailand) |
| MMF | Thailand | BMW |
| MMH | Thailand | Tata |
| MMK | Thailand | Toyota (Toyota Auto Works plant) |
| MMM | Thailand | Chevrolet |
| MML | Thailand | MG |
| MMR | Thailand | Subaru |
| MMS | Thailand | Suzuki |
| MMT | Thailand | Mitsubishi Motors (Thailand) |
| MMU | Thailand | Holden |
| MNA | Thailand | Ford (Ford-Mazda AAT plant) for Australia/New Zealand export |
| MNB | Thailand | Ford (Ford-Mazda AAT plant) for other right-hand drive markets |
| MNC | Thailand | Ford (Ford-Mazda AAT plant) for left-hand drive markets |
| MNK | Thailand | Hino Motors Manufacturing Thailand Co Ltd |
| MNT | Thailand | Nissan Motor Thailand |
| MPA | Thailand | IMCT Isuzu Motors Company Thailand |
| MPB | Thailand | Ford (FTM plant) |
| MP1 | Thailand | IMCT Isuzu Motors Company Thailand |
| MP2 | Thailand | Mazda BT-50 pickup built by Isuzu Motors (Thailand) Co., Ltd. |
| MP5 | Thailand | Foton |
| MRH | Thailand | Honda car |
| MR0 | Thailand | Toyota (Ban Pho and Samrong plant) |
| MR1 | Thailand | Toyota (Samrong plant) (Fortuner) |
| MR2 | Thailand | Toyota (Gateway plant) |
| MRX | Thailand | BYD AUTO (THAILAND) CO., LTD. |
| MS0 | Myanmar | SSS MOTORS Myanmar/Kia |
| MS3 | Myanmar | Suzuki Myanmar Motor Co., Ltd. |
| MXV | Kazakhstan | IMZ-Ural Ural Motorcycles |
| MX3 | Kazakhstan | Hyundai Trans Auto |
| N3C | Iran | Kavir motor Company (Yektaz) |
| N58 | Iran | Kavir motor Company (EURASIA) |
| NAK | Iran | Kerman Motor Company |
| NAA | Iran | Iran khodro Company |
| NAD | Iran | Saipa Diesel |
| NAG | Iran | Bahman Industrial Group |
| NAP | Iran | Pars Khodro |
| NAS | Iran | Saipa Co. |
| NC0 | South Africa | BMW South Africa |
| NFB | Pakistan | Honda Atlas Cars Pakistan Ltd |
| NG3 | Pakistan | Lucky Motor Corporation |
| NLA | Turkey | Honda cars |
| NLC | Turkey | Askam Kamyon Imalat Ve Ticaret A.S. |
| NLH | Turkey | Hyundai Assan Otomotiv car/SUV |
| NLJ | Turkey | Hyundai Assan Otomotiv van |
| NLN | Turkey | Karsan Automotive Industry & Trade |
| NLR | Turkey | Otokar |
| NLT | Turkey | TEMSA |
| NL1 | Turkey | Togg |
| NMA | Turkey | MAN Türkiye A.Ş. |
| NMB | Turkey | Mercedes-Benz Türk A.S. |
| NMC | Turkey | BMC Otomotiv Sanayi ve Ticaret A.Ş. |
| NMH | Turkey | Honda motorcycle |
| NMT | Turkey | Toyota Motor Manufacturing Turkey |
| NM0 | Turkey | Ford Otosan |
| NM1 | Turkey | Oyak-Renault Oto Fab AS |
| NM4 | Turkey | Tofas (Turk Otomobil Fabrikasi AS) |
| NNA | Turkey | Anadolu Isuzu |
| PAB | Philippines | Isuzu Philippines Corporation |
| PAD | Philippines | Honda Cars Philippines |
| PAF | Philippines | BMW Philippines |
| PE1 | Philippines | Ford Motor Company Philippines |
| PE3 | Philippines | Mazda Philippines made by Ford Motor Company Philippines |
| PL1 | Malaysia | Proton |
| PL8 | Malaysia | Hyundai/Inokom |
| PLP | Malaysia | Subaru |
| PLZ | Malaysia | Isuzu Malaysia |
| PMH | Malaysia | Honda car |
| PML | Malaysia | Hicom |
| PM1 | Malaysia | BMW |
| PM2 | Malaysia | Perodua |
| PM9 | Malaysia | Bufori |
| PMK | Malaysia | Honda Boon Siew motorcycle |
| PMN | Malaysia | Modenas |
| PMV | Malaysia | Hong Leong Yamaha Motor Sdn. Bhd. |
| PNA | Malaysia | Naza/Kia/Peugeot |
| PNA | Malaysia | Peugeot |
| PNV | Malaysia | Volvo Cars |
| PN1 PN2 | Malaysia | Toyota |
| PN8 | Malaysia | Nissan |
| PP1 | Malaysia | Mazda |
| PP3 | Malaysia | Hyundai |
| PPP | Malaysia | Suzuki |
| PPV | Malaysia | Volkswagen |
| PR8 | Malaysia | Ford |
| PRA | Malaysia | Sinotruk |
| PRB | Malaysia | Jaecoo (Chery Jaecoo) |
| PRH | Malaysia | Chery |
| PRN | Malaysia | GAC Trumpchi made by Warisan Tan Chong Automotif Malaysia |
| LFA | Taiwan | Ford Lio Ho Motor Co Ltd old designation |
| LM1 LM4 | Taiwan | Tai Ling Motor Co Ltd old designation |
| LPR | Taiwan | Yamaha Motor Taiwan Co. Ltd. old designation |
| RF3 | Taiwan | Aeon Motor |
| RF5 | Taiwan | Yulon Motor Co Ltd |
| RFB | Taiwan | Kymco |
| RFC | Taiwan | Taiwan Golden Bee |
| RFD | Taiwan | Tai Ling Motor Co Ltd new designation |
| RFG | Taiwan | SYM Motors |
| RFV | Taiwan | PGO Scooters including Genuine Scooter Company models made by PGO |
| RGS | Taiwan | Kawasaki made by Kymco |
| RHA | Taiwan | Ford Lio Ho Motor Co Ltd new designation |
| RK7 | Taiwan | Kawasaki ATV made by Tai Ling Motor Co Ltd (rebadged Suzuki ATV) new designation |
| RKJ | Taiwan | Prince Motors Taiwan |
| RKL | Taiwan | Kuozui Motors (Toyota) |
| RKM | Taiwan | China Motor Corporation |
| RKR | Taiwan | Yamaha Motor Taiwan Co. Ltd. new designation |
| RKT | Taiwan | Honda Taiwan |
| RL0 | Vietnam | Ford Vietnam |
| RL4 | Vietnam | Toyota Motor Vietnam |
| RLA | Vietnam | Vina Star Motors Corp. – Mitsubishi |
| RLC | Vietnam | Yamaha Motor Vietnam Co. Ltd. |
| RLE | Vietnam | Isuzu Vietnam Co. |
| RLF | Vietnam | BMW BMW cars 2003-2014 Vietnam |
| RLH | Vietnam | Honda Vietnam Co. Ltd. |
| RLL | Vietnam | VinFast SUV |
| RLM | Vietnam | Mercedes-Benz Vietnam |
| RLV | Vietnam | Vietnam Precision Industrial CO., Ltd. Can-Am DS 70 & DS 90 |
| RP8 | Vietnam | Piaggio Vietnam Co. Ltd. |
| R4N | Hong Kong | Elyx Smart Technology Holdings (Hong Kong) Ltd. |
=== Europe ===
| SA9 | United Kingdom < 500 units | Morgan Motor Company |
| SA9 | United Kingdom < 500 units | OX Global |
| SA9 005 | United Kingdom < 500 units | Panther |
| SA9 019 | United Kingdom < 500 units | TVR |
| SA9 039 | United Kingdom < 500 units | Westfield Sportscars |
| SA9 048 | United Kingdom < 500 units | McLaren F1 |
| SA9 050 | United Kingdom < 500 units | Marcos Engineering |
| SA9 130 | United Kingdom < 500 units | MG Sport and Racing |
| SA9 202 | United Kingdom < 500 units | Morgan 3-Wheeler |
| SA9 484 | United Kingdom < 500 units | Munro Vehicles |
| SA9 506 | United Kingdom < 500 units | KaiserRushforth |
| SA9 AC | AC Car Group Ltd. | |
| SAA | United Kingdom | Austin |
| SAB | United Kingdom | Optare |
| SAD | United Kingdom | Daimler until April 1987 |
| SAD | United Kingdom | Jaguar SUV |
| SAF | United Kingdom | ERF |
| SAH | United Kingdom | Honda made by Austin Rover Group |
| SAJ | United Kingdom | Jaguar |
| SAL | United Kingdom | Land Rover |
| SAM | United Kingdom | Morris |
| SAR | United Kingdom | Rover & MG Rover Group |
| SAT | United Kingdom | Triumph car |
| SAX | United Kingdom | Austin Rover Group including Sterling Cars |
| SAY | United Kingdom | Norton Motorcycles |
| SAZ | United Kingdom | Freight Rover |
| SBB | United Kingdom | Leyland Vehicles |
| SBC | United Kingdom | Iveco Ford Truck |
| SBJ | United Kingdom | Leyland Bus |
| SBL | United Kingdom | Leyland Motors & Leyland DAF |
| SBM | United Kingdom | McLaren Group |
| SBS | United Kingdom | Scammell |
| SBV | United Kingdom | Kenworth & Peterbilt trucks made by Leyland Trucks |
| SB1 | United Kingdom | Toyota Manufacturing UK |
| SCA | United Kingdom | Rolls-Royce Motor Cars & Rolls-Royce Motors car |
| SCB | United Kingdom | Bentley Motors Limited |
| SCC | United Kingdom | Lotus Cars Limited |
| SCD | United Kingdom | Reliant Motors |
| SCE | United Kingdom | DeLorean |
| SCF | United Kingdom | Aston Martin Lagonda Limited |
| SCG | United Kingdom | Triumph Engineering original Triumph Motorcycle company |
| SCK | United Kingdom | Ifor Williams Trailers |
| SCR | United Kingdom | London Electric Vehicle Company & London Taxi Company & London Taxis International |
| SCV | United Kingdom | Volvo Truck & Bus |
| SC6 | United Kingdom | INEOS Automotive made in France |
| SDB | United Kingdom | Talbot Motor Company |
| SDF | United Kingdom | Dodge Trucks – UK 1981–1984 |
| SDG | United Kingdom | Renault Trucks Industries 1985–1992 |
| SDK | United Kingdom | Caterham Cars |
| SDL | United Kingdom | TVR |
| SDP | United Kingdom | MG Motor NAC MG UK & MG Motor UK |
| SD7 | United Kingdom | Aston Martin SUVs |
| SED | United Kingdom | IBC Vehicles (Isuzu Bedford Company) |
| SEG | United Kingdom | Dennis Eagle |
| SEY | United Kingdom | LDV Group |
| SFA | United Kingdom | Ford of Britain |
| SFD | United Kingdom | Dennis |
| SFE | United Kingdom | Alexander Dennis |
| SFN | United Kingdom | Foden |
| SFZ | United Kingdom | Tesla Roadster made by Lotus |
| SGD | United Kingdom | Swift Group Ltd. |
| SHH | United Kingdom | Honda UK Manufacturing car |
| SHS | United Kingdom | Honda UK Manufacturing SUV |
| SJA | United Kingdom | Bentley SUV |
| SJK | United Kingdom | Nissan Motor Manufacturing UK Infiniti |
| SJN | United Kingdom | Nissan Motor Manufacturing UK Nissan |
| SKA | United Kingdom | Vauxhall Motors |
| SKF | United Kingdom | Bedford Vehicles |
| SLA | United Kingdom | Rolls-Royce Motor Cars SUV |
| SLP | United Kingdom | JC Bamford Excavators |
| SLV | United Kingdom | Volvo Bus |
| SMT | United Kingdom | Triumph Motorcycles Ltd current Triumph Motorcycle company |
| SNE | East Germany | Wartburg |
| SNT | East Germany | Trabant |
| SNZ | East Germany | MZ Motorrad- und Zweiradwerk |
| SUA | Poland | Sanocka Fabryka Autobusow Sfa / Autosan |
| SUD | Poland | Wielton |
| SUE | Poland | BOSMAL |
| SUF | Poland | Fabryka Samochodów Małolitrażowych |
| SUJ | Poland | Jelcz |
| SUL | Poland | FSC Lublin Automotive Factory |
| SUM | Poland | Metal-Fach Sp. z o.o. |
| SUN | Poland | FSD |
| SUP | Poland | Fabryka Samochodow Osobowych |
| SUR | Poland | Factory of Agricultural Vehicles ‘Polmo’ in Poznań |
| SUS | Poland | Fabryka Samochodów Ciężarowych „Star” |
| SUU | Poland | Solaris Bus & Coach |
| SUZ | Poland | Zasław |
| SVS | Poland | BODEX |
| SW9 | Poland | Solbus |
| SX9 | Poland | SOMMER |
| SZ9 | Poland | EPOKA |
| SZA | Poland | Scania Production Slupsk |
| SZB | Poland | Pronar |
| SZH | Poland | BWW |
| SZR | BORO | |
| TAM | Switzerland | Mowag |
| TAP | Switzerland | Polaris Europe (based in Switzerland) |
| TAW | Switzerland | Nutzfahrzeuggesellschaft Arbon & Wetzikon (NAW) former Swiss manufacturer of commercial vehicles (until 2003) |
| TCC | Switzerland | Micro Compact Car (until 5/99) |
| TEB | Switzerland | Bucher Municipal including Johnston Sweepers of the UK (owned by Bucher Municipal of Switzerland) |
| TH9 | Switzerland | Carrosserie HESS AG Swiss manufacturer of buses and trolleybuses |
| TK9 SL5 | Czech Republic | SOR Libchavy |
| TLJ | Czech Republic | Jawa Moto |
| TMA | Czech Republic | Hyundai Motor Manufacturing Czech car |
| TMB | Czech Republic | Škoda Auto AS |
| TMC | Czech Republic | Hyundai Motor Manufacturing Czech SUV |
| TMK | Czech Republic | Karosa |
| TMP | Czech Republic | Škoda Ostrov |
| TMT | Czech Republic | Tatra car |
| TNA | Czech Republic | Avia/Daewoo Avia |
| TNT TNU | Czech Republic | Tatra trucks |
| TRA | Hungary | Ikarus Bus |
| TRU | Hungary | Audi |
| TSM | Hungary | Suzuki |
| TW1 | Portugal | Toyota Caetano Portugal |
| TW3 | Portugal | Renault Portuguesa SARL |
| TW7 | Portugal | Mini Moke made by British Leyland & Austin Rover |
| TW8 | Portugal | General Motors De Portugal Lda |
| TWG | Portugal | Salvador Caetano |
| TX5 | Portugal | Mini Moke made by Cagiva |
| TYA | Portugal | Mitsubishi Fuso Truck and Bus Corp. |
| TYB | Portugal | Mitsubishi Fuso Truck and Bus Corp. |
| U5Y | Slovakia | Kia Motors Slovakia car |
| U6Y | Slovakia | Kia Motors Slovakia SUV |
| UKH | Denmark | HARDI International A/S (Agricultural Machinery) |
| ULA | Denmark | ASA-LIFT: Vegetable Technology Specialist (Agricultural Machinery) |
| UU1 | Romania | Dacia |
| UU2 | Romania | Oltcit |
| UU3 | Romania | ARO |
| UU5 | Romania | Rocar |
| UU6 | Romania | Daewoo Romania |
| UU7 | Romania | Euro Bus Diamond |
| UU9 | Romania | Astra Bus |
| UZT | Romania | UTB (Uzina de Tractoare Brașov) |
| VA0 | Austria | ÖAF |
| VAG | Austria | Steyr-Daimler-Puch Puch G & Steyr-Puch Pinzgauer |
| VAN | Austria | Steyr-Daimler-Puch Steyr Trucks |
| VAK | Austria | Kässbohrer Transport Technik |
| VBK | Austria | KTM |
| VBK | Austria | Husqvarna Motorcycles & Gas Gas under KTM ownership |
| VCF | Austria | Fisker Inc. (Fisker Ocean) made by Magna Steyr |
| VF1 | France | Renault & Eagle Medallion made by Renault |
| VF2 | France | Renault Trucks |
| VF3 | France | Peugeot |
| VF4 | France | Talbot |
| VF5 | France | Iveco Unic |
| VF6 | France | Renault Trucks |
| VF7 | France | Citroën |
| VF8 | France | Matra/Talbot/Simca |
| VF9 607 | France | Mathieu Fayat Group |
| VF9 673 | France | Venturi Automobiles |
| VF9 795 | France | Bugatti Automobiles S.A.S. |
| VFA | France | Alpine |
| VG5 | France | MBK & Yamaha Motor |
| VG6 | France | Renault Trucks & Mack Trucks medium duty trucks made by Renault Trucks |
| VG7, VG8 | France | Renault Trucks |
| VG9 | France | EVRARD (Agricultural Machinery) |
| VGA | France | Peugeot Motocycles |
| VJ1 | France | Heuliez Bus |
| VK8 | France | Venturi Automobiles |
| VL4 | France | Bluecar |
| VLU | France | Scania Production Angers |
| VMK | France | Renault Sport Spider |
| VN1 | France | Renault SOVAB |
| VNE | France | Iveco Bus |
| VNK | France | Toyota Motor Manufacturing France |
| VNV | France | Nissan |
| VR1 | France | DS Automobiles |
| VR3 | France | Peugeot |
| VR7 | France | Citroën |
| VPS | France | MLT Automotive |
| VXE | France | Opel Automobile GmbH/Vauxhall van |
| VXK | France | Opel Automobile GmbH/Vauxhall car/SUV |
| VYC | France | Lancia (models on PSA CMP platform) |
| VS1 | Spain | Pegaso |
| VS5 | Spain | Renault España |
| VF1 | Spain | Renault Samsung QM3 |
| VS6 | Spain | Ford Espana |
| VS7 | Spain | Citroën |
| VS8 | Spain | Peugeot |
| VS9 | Spain | Comarth |
| VSC | Spain | Mercedes-Benz Espana SA (Vitoria) |
| VSE | Spain | Santana Motor |
| VSK | Spain | Nissan Motor Iberica SA, Nissan passenger car/MPV/van/SUV/pickup & Ford Maverick 1993–1999 |
| VSS | Spain | SEAT |
| VSX | Spain | Opel Automobile Espana, SA |
| VTD | Spain | Montesa Honda Honda Montesa motorcycle models |
| VTH | Spain | Derbi |
| VTL | Spain | Yamaha Motor España SA & Yamaha Sociedad Española de Motocicletas |
| VTM | Spain | Montesa Honda Honda motorcycle models |
| VTR | Spain | Gas Gas |
| VTT | Spain | Suzuki Motor España Motorcycle |
| VV9 | Spain | Tauro Sport Auto |
| VWA | Nissan Vehiculos Industriales SA, Nissan Commercial Vehicles | |
| VX1 | Yugoslavia/Serbia | Zastava Automobiles |
| V31 | Croatia | Tvornica Autobusa Zagreb (TAZ) |
| V39 AB8 | Croatia | Rimac Automobili |
| WAC | Germany | Audi/Porsche RS 2 Avant |
| WAG | Germany | Neoplan |
| WAU | Germany | Audi car |
| WAP | Germany | Alpina |
| WUA | Germany | Audi SUV |
| WBA | Germany | BMW car |
| WBS | Germany | BMW M car |
| WBX | Germany | BMW SUV |
| WBY | Germany | BMW i car |
| WB1 | Germany | BMW Motorrad Motorcycle |
| WB3 | Germany | BMW Motorrad Motorcycles made in India |
| WB4 | Germany | BMW Motorrad Motorscooters made in China |
| WB5 | Germany | BMW i SUV |
| WB6 | Germany | BMW M SUV |
| WCD | Germany | Freightliner Sprinter "bus" (van with more than 3 rows of seats) 2008–2019 |
| WD0 | Germany | Dodge Sprinter truck (cargo van with 1 row of seats) 2005–2009 |
| WD1 | Germany | Freightliner Sprinter 2002 & Sprinter (Dodge or Freightliner) 2003–2005 incomplete vehicle |
| WD2 | Germany | Freightliner Sprinter 2002 & Sprinter (Dodge or Freightliner) 2003–2005 truck (cargo van with 1 row of seats) |
| WD3 | Germany | Mercedes-Benz truck (cargo van with 1 row of seats) (North America) |
| WD4 | Germany | Mercedes-Benz MPV (van with 2 or 3 rows of seats) (North America) |
| WD5 | Germany | Freightliner Sprinter 2002 & Sprinter (Dodge or Freightliner) 2003–2005 MPV (van with 2 or 3 rows of seats) |
| WD6 | Germany | Freightliner Unimog truck |
| WD7 | Germany | Freightliner Unimog incomplete vehicle |
| WD8 | Germany | Dodge Sprinter MPV (van with 2 or 3 rows of seats) 2005–2009 |
| WDA | Germany | Mercedes-Benz incomplete vehicle (North America) |
| WDB | Germany | Mercedes-Benz & Maybach |
| WDC | Germany | Mercedes-Benz SUV |
| WDD | Germany | Mercedes-Benz car |
| WDF | Germany | Mercedes-Benz van (French & Spanish built models – Citan & Vito & X-Class) |
| WDP | Germany | Freightliner Sprinter incomplete vehicle 2005–2019 |
| WDR | Germany | Freightliner Sprinter MPV (van with 2 or 3 rows of seats) 2005–2019 |
| WDW | Germany | Dodge Sprinter "bus" (van with more than 3 rows of seats) 2008–2009 |
| WDX | Germany | Dodge Sprinter incomplete vehicle 2005–2009 |
| WDY | Germany | Freightliner Sprinter truck (cargo van with 1 row of seats) 2005–2019 |
| WDZ | Germany | Mercedes-Benz "bus" (van with more than 3 rows of seats) (North America) |
| WEB | Germany | EvoBus Mercedes-Benz buses |
| WEL | Germany | e.GO Mobile AG |
| WF0 | Germany | Ford of Europe |
| WF1 | Germany | Merkur |
| WJM | Germany | Iveco/Iveco Magirus |
| WJR | Germany | Irmscher |
| WKK | Germany | Setra & Karl Kässbohrer Fahrzeugwerke |
| WKE | Germany | Krone Trailer |
| WMA | Germany | MAN |
| WME | Germany | Smart (from 5/99) |
| WMW | Germany | Mini car made in England or the Netherlands |
| WMX | Germany | Mercedes-AMG used for Mercedes-Benz SLS AMG & Mercedes-AMG GT (not used in North America) |
| WMZ | Germany | Mini SUV |
| WNA | Germany | Next.e.GO Mobile SE |
| WP0 | Germany | Porsche car, see also: Porsche VIN specification |
| WP1 | Germany | Porsche SUV |
| WS5 | Germany | StreetScooter |
| WSM | Germany | Schmitz Cargobull |
| WUA | Germany | Audi Sport GmbH & Quattro GmbH car |
| WU1 | Germany | Audi Sport GmbH SUV |
| WVG | Germany | Volkswagen SUV |
| WVM | Germany | Arbeitsgemeinschaft VW-MAN |
| WVP | Germany | Viseon Bus |
| WVW | Germany | Volkswagen car |
| WV1 | Germany | Volkswagen Commercial Vehicles |
| WV2 | Germany | Volkswagen Commercial Vehicles |
| WZ1 | Germany | Toyota Supra Fifth generation |
| W04 | Germany | Buick Regal & Buick Cascada |
| W06 | Germany | Cadillac Catera |
| W08 | Germany | Saturn Astra |
| W09 B09 | Germany | Bitter Cars |
| W09 B16 | Germany | Brabus |
| W09 D05 | Germany | Drögmöller |
| W09 HA8 | Germany | HWA AG |
| W09 R06 | Germany | Ruf Automobile |
| W0L | Germany | Adam Opel AG/Vauxhall & Holden |
| W0S | Germany | Opel Special Vehicles |
| W0V | Germany | Opel Automobile Gmbh/Vauxhall & Holden |
| W1A | Germany | Smart |
| W1H | Germany | Freightliner Econic |
| W1K | Germany | Mercedes-Benz car |
| W1N | Germany | Mercedes-Benz SUV |
| W1T | Germany | Mercedes-Benz truck |
| W1V | Germany | Mercedes-Benz van |
| W1W | Germany | Mercedes-Benz MPV (van with 2 or 3 rows of seats) (North America) |
| W1X | Germany | Mercedes-Benz incomplete vehicle (North America) |
| W1Y | Germany | Mercedes-Benz truck (cargo van with 1 row of seats) (North America) |
| W1Z | Germany | Mercedes-Benz "bus" (van with more than 3 rows of seats) (North America) |
| W2W | Germany | Freightliner Sprinter MPV (van with 2 or 3 rows of seats) |
| W2X | Germany | Freightliner Sprinter incomplete vehicle |
| W2Y | Germany | Freightliner Sprinter truck (cargo van with 1 row of seats) |
| W2Z | Germany | Freightliner Sprinter "bus" (van with more than 3 rows of seats) |
| XBB | Bulgaria | Great Wall Motors/Litex Motors AD |
| XL9 003 | Netherlands | Autobusfabriek Bova BV |
| XL9 320 | Netherlands | VDL Bova |
| XL9 363 | Netherlands | Spyker Cars |
| XL9 A27 | Netherlands | Groenewold Carrosseriefabriek B.V. |
| XLB | Netherlands | Volvo Car B.V./NedCar B.V. (Volvo Cars) |
| XLE | Netherlands | Scania Nederland B.V. |
| XLR | Netherlands | DAF Trucks & Leyland DAF |
| XLV | Netherlands | DAF Bus |
| XMC | Netherlands | NedCar B.V. Mitsubishi Motors |
| XMG | Netherlands | VDL Bus International |
| XNC | Netherlands | NedCar B.V. Mitsubishi Motors (Colt CZC convertible) |
| XNL | Netherlands | VDL Bus & Coach |
| XNT | Netherlands | Pacton Trailer |
| XP7 | Netherlands | Tesla Europe (based in the Netherlands) |
| XTA | Russia | AvtoVAZ |
| XTB | Russia | AZLK |
| XTC | Russia | KAMAZ |
| XTE | Russia | ZAZ |
| XTF | Russia | GolAZ |
| XTH | Russia | GAZ |
| XTT | Russia | UAZ |
| XTY | Russia | LiAZ |
| XU1 | Russia | UAZ Special Purpose Vehicles |
| XUF | Russia | General Motors Russia |
| XUU | Russia | Chevrolet made by Avtotor |
| XW7 | Russia | Toyota Motor Manufacturing Russia |
| XW8 | Russia | Volkswagen Group Rus |
| XWE | Russia | Hyundai Motor Company & Kia made by Avtotor |
| X1E | Russia | KAvZ |
| X1M | Russia | PAZ |
| X4X | Russia | BMW made by Avtotor |
| X7L | Russia | Renault Russia |
| X8J | Russia | IMZ-Ural Ural Motorcycles |
| X96 | Russia | GAZ |
| X9F | Russia | Ford Motor Company ZAO |
| X9L | Russia | GM-AvtoVAZ |
| X9P | Russia | Volvo Vostok ZAO Volvo Trucks |
| X9X | Russia | Great Wall Motors IMS Avtotrade-12 LLC |
| Z6F | Russia | Ford Sollers |
| Z8N | Russia | Nissan Manufacturing Rus |
| Z8T | Russia | PCMA Rus |
| Z94 | Russia | Hyundai Motor Manufacturing Rus |
| Z9M | Mercedes-Benz Trucks Vostok | |
| XWB | Uzbekistán | UzDaewoo GM Uzbekistan Ravon |
| Y4K | Belarus | BelGee |
| Y6D | Ukraine | ZAZ |
| Y6J | Ukraine | Bogdan group |
| Y6U | Ukraine | Škoda Auto made by Eurocar |
| Y7B | Ukraine | Bogdan group |
| Y7C | Ukraine | Great Wall Motors KrASZ |
| YAR | Belgium | Toyota Motor Europe (based in Belgium) used for Toyota ProAce & Toyota ProAce City |
| YB3 | Belgium | Volvo Trucks |
| YB6 | Belgium | Jonckheere |
| YC1 | Belgium | Honda |
| YE2 | Belgium | Van Hool |
| YH2 | Finland | Lynx (snowmobile) |
| YH4 | Finland | Fisker Automotive (Fisker Karma) built by Valmet Automotive |
| YK1 | Finland | Saab built by Valmet Automotive |
| YK7 | Finland | Sisu Auto |
| YS2 | Sweden | Scania, Södertälje truck |
| YS3 | Sweden | Saab |
| YS4 | Sweden | Scania, Katrineholm bus |
| YSC | Sweden | Cadillac BLS built by Saab |
| YSM | Sweden | Polestar |
| YT9 | Sweden | Gin 1 Cars |
| YT9 007 | Sweden | Koenigsegg Automotive AB |
| YTN | Sweden | Saab NEVS |
| YTM | Sweden | Jakob Mining Vehicles built in Sweden |
| YU7 | Sweden | Husaberg Swedish built |
| YV1 | Sweden | Volvo Cars car |
| YV2 | Sweden | Volvo Trucks |
| YV3 | Sweden | Volvo Buses |
| YV4 | Sweden | Volvo Cars SUV |
| YV5 | Sweden | Volvo Trucks incomplete vehicle |
| YYC | Norway | Think Nordic |
| ZA9 A12 | Italy | Lamborghini through mid 2003 |
| ZA9 D38 | Italy | Cizeta Automobili SRL |
| ZA9 D39 | Italy | Bugatti Automobili S.p.A |
| ZA9 F76 | Italy | Pagani Automobili S.p.A. |
| ZA9 M09 | Italy | Italdesign Automobili Speciali |
| ZA9 M27 | Italy | Dallara Stradale |
| ZA9 M91 | Italy | Automobili Pininfarina |
| ZAA | Italy | Autobianchi (last models are as Alfa Romeo) |
| ZAC | Italy | Jeep and Dodge Hornet |
| ZAH | Italy | Rolfo |
| ZAM | Italy | Maserati car |
| ZAP | Italy | Piaggio and Vespa and Gilera |
| ZAR | Italy | Alfa Romeo car & Nissan Cherry Europe |
| ZAS | Italy | Alfa Romeo Alfasud & Sprint through 1989 |
| ZAS | Italy | Alfa Romeo SUV 2018- |
| ZBA | Italy | BMW For South africa |
| ZBB | Italy | Gruppo Bertone |
| ZBI | Italy | BMW For Indonesia |
| ZBM | Italy | BMW For Philippines |
| ZBN | Italy | Benelli |
| ZBP | Italy | BMW For Malaysia |
| ZBT | Italy | BMW For Thailand |
| ZBW | Italy | Rayton-Fissore Magnum |
| ZC2 | Italy | Chrysler TC by Maserati |
| ZC6 | Italy | Effedi Veicoli Commerciali |
| ZCF | Italy | Iveco |
| ZCG | Italy | Cagiva & MV Agusta |
| ZCG | Italy | Husqvarna Motorcycles Under MV Agusta ownership |
| ZD0 | Italy | Yamaha Motor Italia SpA & Belgarda SpA |
| ZD3 | Italy | Betamotor S.p.A. |
| ZD4 | Italy | Aprilia |
| ZDC | Italy | Honda Italia Industriale S.p.A. |
| ZDM | Italy | Ducati Motor Holding |
| ZDT | Italy | De Tomaso Modena SpA |
| ZDY | Italy | Cacciamali |
| ZE8 | Italy | Bremach |
| ZES | Italy | Bimota |
| ZF4 | Italy | Qvale |
| ZFA | Italy | Fiat car Also Fiat Fullback |
| ZFB | Italy | Fiat MPV/SUV |
| ZFC | Italy | Ram 1200 |
| ZFF | Italy | Ferrari |
| ZFM | Italy | Fantic Motor |
| ZFR | Italy | Pininfarina |
| ZGA | Italy | Iveco Bus |
| ZGU | Italy | Moto Guzzi |
| ZHU | Italy | Husqvarna Motorcycles Under Cagiva ownership |
| ZHW | Italy | Lamborghini car from mid 2003 |
| ZJM | Italy | Malaguti |
| ZJN | Italy | Innocenti |
| ZJT | Italy | Italjet |
| ZKH | Italy | Husqvarna Motorcycles Srl Under BMW ownership |
| ZK5 | Italy | Hyundai Automobili Italia Importazioni |
| ZLA | Italy | Lancia |
| ZLM | Italy | Moto Morini srl |
| ZLV | Italy | Laverda |
| ZN0 | Italy | SWM Motorcycles S.r.l. |
| ZN3 | Italy | Iveco Defence |
| ZN6 | Italy | Maserati SUV |
| ZNN | Italy | Energica Motor Company |
| ZPB | Italy | Lamborghini SUV |
| ZPY | Italy | DR Automobiles |
| ZZ1 | Slovenia | Tomos motorcycle |
=== North America ===
| 1A4 1A8 | United States | Chrysler brand MPV/SUV 2006–2009 only |
| 1AC | United States | American Motors Corporation MPV |
| 1AF | United States | American LaFrance truck |
| 1AM | United States | American Motors Corporation car & Renault Alliance 1983 only |
| 1B3 | United States | Dodge car 1981–2011 |
| 1B4 | United States | Dodge MPV/SUV 1981–2002 |
| 1B6 | United States | Dodge incomplete vehicle 1981–2002 |
| 1B7 | United States | Dodge truck 1981–2002 |
| 1B9 133 | United States | Buell Motorcycle Company through mid 1995 |
| 1B9 975 | United States | Motus Motorcycles |
| 1BA | United States | Blue Bird Corporation bus |
| 1BB | United States | Blue Bird Wanderlodge MPV |
| 1BD | United States | Blue Bird Corporation incomplete vehicle |
| 1BL | United States | Balko, Inc. from Ladysmith, WI |
| 1C3 | United States | Chrysler brand car 1981–2011 |
| 1C3 | United States | Chrysler Group (all brands) car (including Lancia) 2012- |
| 1C4 | United States | Chrysler brand MPV 1990–2005 |
| 1C4 | United States | Chrysler Group (all brands) MPV 2012– |
| 1C6 | United States | Chrysler Group (all brands) truck 2012– |
| 1C8 | United States | Chrysler brand MPV 2001–2005 |
| 1C9 291 | United States | CX Automotive |
| 1CM | United States | Checker Motors Corporation |
| 1CU | United States | Cushman Haulster (Cushman division of Outboard Marine Corporation) |
| 1CY | United States | Crane Carrier Company |
| 1D3 | United States | Dodge truck 2002–2009 |
| 1D4 | United States | Dodge MPV/SUV 2003–2011 only |
| 1D7 | United States | Dodge truck 2002–2011 |
| 1D8 | United States | Dodge MPV/SUV 2003–2009 only |
| 1F | United States | Ford |
| 1F1 | United States | Ford SUV – limousine (through 2009) |
| 1F6 | United States | Ford stripped chassis made by Detroit Chassis LLC |
| 1F9 ST2 | United States | Seagrave |
| 1FA | United States | Ford car |
| 1FB | United States | Ford "bus" (van with more than 3 rows of seats) |
| 1FC | United States | Ford stripped chassis made by Ford |
| 1FD | United States | Ford incomplete vehicle (chassis cab) |
| 1FM | United States | Ford MPV/SUV |
| 1FT | United States | Ford truck |
| 1FU 1FV | United States | Freightliner Trucks |
| 1G | United States | General Motors |
| 1G0 | United States | GMC "bus" (van with more than 3 rows of seats) 1981–1986 |
| 1G0 | United States | GMC Rapid Transit Series (RTS) bus 1981–1986 |
| 1G0 | United States | Opel car 2007–2017 |
| 1G1 | United States | Chevrolet car |
| 1G2 | United States | Pontiac car |
| 1G3 | United States | Oldsmobile car |
| 1G4 | United States | Buick car |
| 1G5 | United States | GMC MPV/SUV 1981–1986 |
| 1G6 | United States | Cadillac car |
| 1G7 | United States | Pontiac car only sold by GM Canada |
| 1G8 | United States | Chevrolet MPV/SUV 1981–1986 |
| 1G8 | United States | Saturn car 1991–2010 |
| 1G9 495 | United States | Google & Waymo |
| 1GA | United States | Chevrolet "bus" (van with more than 3 rows of seats) |
| 1GB | United States | Chevrolet incomplete vehicles |
| 1GC | United States | Chevrolet truck |
| 1GD | United States | GMC incomplete vehicles |
| 1GE | United States | Cadillac incomplete vehicle |
| 1GF | United States | Flxible bus |
| 1GG | United States | Isuzu pickup trucks made by GM |
| 1GH | United States | Oldsmobile MPV/SUV 1990–2004 |
| 1GH | United States | Holden Acadia 2019–2020 |
| 1GJ | United States | GMC "bus" (van with more than 3 rows of seats) 1987– |
| 1GK | United States | GMC MPV/SUV 1987– |
| 1GM | United States | Pontiac MPV |
| 1GN | United States | Chevrolet MPV/SUV 1987- |
| 1GT | United States | GMC truck |
| 1GY | United States | Cadillac SUV |
| 1H9 A | United States | Crane Carrier Company |
| 1HA | United States | Chevrolet incomplete vehicles made by Navistar International |
| 1HD | United States | Harley-Davidson |
| 1HF | United States | Honda motorcycle/ATV/UTV |
| 1HG | United States | Honda car made by Honda of America Mfg. in Ohio |
| 1HS | United States | International Trucks & Caterpillar Trucks truck |
| 1HT | United States | International Trucks & Caterpillar Trucks & Chevrolet Silverado 4500HD, 5500HD, 6500HD incomplete vehicle |
| 1HV | United States | IC Bus incomplete bus |
| 1J4 | United States | Jeep SUV 1989–2011 (using Chrysler-style VIN structure) |
| 1J7 | United States | Jeep truck 1989–1992 (using Chrysler-style VIN structure) |
| 1J8 | United States | Jeep SUV 2002–2011 (using Chrysler-style VIN structure) |
| 1JC | United States | Jeep SUV 1981–1988 (using AMC-style VIN structure) |
| 1JT | United States | Jeep truck 1981–1988 (using AMC-style VIN structure) |
| 1JU | United States | Marmon Motor Company |
| 1L | United States | Lincoln |
| 1L1 | United States | Lincoln car – limousine |
| 1L9 234 | United States | Laforza |
| 1LJ | United States | Lincoln incomplete vehicle |
| 1LN | United States | Lincoln car |
| 1LV | United States | John Deere equipment designed in Augusta, Georgia |
| 1M0 | United States | John Deere Gator |
| 1M1 1M2 | United States | Mack Trucks |
| 1M8 | United States | Motor Coach Industries |
| 1M9 682 | United States | Mosler Automotive |
| 1M9 816 | United States | Proterra Through mid-2019 |
| 1MB | United States | Mercedes-Benz Truck Co. |
| 1ME | United States | Mercury car |
| 1MR | United States | Continental Mark VI & VII 1981–1985 & Continental sedan 1982–1985 |
| 1N4 | United States | Nissan car |
| 1N6 | United States | Nissan truck |
| 1N9 013 | United States | Neoplan USA |
| 1N9 393 | United States | Nikola Corporation |
| 1NK | United States | Kenworth incomplete vehicle |
| 1NP | United States | Peterbilt incomplete vehicle |
| 1NX | United States | Toyota car made by NUMMI |
| 1P3 | United States | Plymouth car |
| 1P4 | United States | Plymouth MPV/SUV |
| 1P9 213 | United States | Panoz |
| 1PY | United States | John Deere equipment designed or manufactured in Pune, India |
| 1S9 098 | United States | Scania AB Scania CN112 bus made in Orange, CT |
| 1S9 842 | United States | Saleen S7 |
| 1S9 944 | United States | SSC North America |
| 1T7 1T8 | United States | Thomas Built Buses |
| 1T9 899 | United States | Tomcar USA |
| 1TU | United States | Transportation Manufacturing Corporation |
| 1UT | United States | Jeep DJ made by AM General |
| 1V1 | United States | Volkswagen truck |
| 1V2 | United States | Volkswagen SUV |
| 1V9 048 | United States | Vector Aeromotive |
| 1VH | United States | Orion Bus Industries |
| 1VR | United States | Vermeer Corporation |
| 1VW | United States | Volkswagen car |
| 1WU | United States | White truck |
| 1WV 1WW | United States | Winnebago Industries |
| 1WX 1WY | United States | White incomplete vehicle |
| 1XK | United States | Kenworth truck |
| 1XM | United States | Renault Alliance/GTA/Encore 1984–1987 |
| 1XP | United States | Peterbilt truck |
| 1Y1 | United States | Chevrolet/Geo car made by NUMMI |
| 1YJ | United States | Rokon International, Inc. |
| 1YV | United States | Mazda |
| 1Z3 1Z7 | United States | Mitsubishi Raider |
| 1Z9 332 | United States | Oshkosh Specialty Vehicles LLC |
| 1ZV | United States | Ford made by AutoAlliance International |
| 1ZW | United States | Mercury made by AutoAlliance International |
| 10R | United States | E-Z-GO |
| 10T | United States | Oshkosh Corporation |
| 12A | United States | Avanti |
| 137 | United States | AM General Hummer & Hummer H1 |
| 15G | United States | Gillig bus |
| 16X | United States | Vixen 21 motorhome |
| 17N | United States | John Deere incomplete vehicle (RV chassis) |
| 19U | United States | Acura car made by Honda of America Mfg. in Ohio |
| 19V | United States | Acura car made by Honda Manufacturing of Indiana |
| 19X | United States | Honda car made by Honda Manufacturing of Indiana |
| 2A3 | Canada | Imperial |
| 2A4 2A8 | Canada | Chrysler brand MPV/SUV 2006–2011 only |
| 2AY 2AZ | Canada | Hino |
| 2B1 | Canada | Orion Bus Industries |
| 2B3 | Canada | Dodge car 1981–2011 |
| 2B4 | Canada | Dodge MPV 1981–2002 |
| 2B5 | Canada | Dodge "bus" (van with more than 3 rows of seats) 1981–2002 |
| 2B6 | Canada | Dodge incomplete vehicle 1981–2002 |
| 2B7 | Canada | Dodge truck 1981–2002 |
| 2BC | Canada | Jeep Wrangler (YJ) 1987–1988 (using AMC-style VIN structure) |
| 2BP | Canada | Ski-Doo |
| 2BV | Canada | Can-Am & Bombardier ATV |
| 2BW | Canada | Can-Am Commander E LSV |
| 2BX | Canada | Can-Am Spyder |
| 2BZ | Canada | Can-Am Freedom Trailer for Can-Am Spyder |
| 2C1 | Canada | Geo/Chevrolet car made by CAMI Automotive |
| 2C3 | Canada | Chrysler brand car 1981–2011 |
| 2C3 | Canada | Chrysler Group (all brands) car (including Lancia) 2012- |
| 2C4 | Canada | Chrysler brand MPV/SUV 2000–2005 |
| 2C4 | Canada | Chrysler Group (all brands) MPV (including Lancia & VW) 2012- |
| 2C7 | Canada | Pontiac car made by CAMI Automotive only sold by GM Canada |
| 2C8 | Canada | Chrysler brand MPV/SUV 2001–2005 |
| 2C9 145 | Canada | Campagna Motors |
| 2CC | Canada | American Motors Corporation MPV |
| 2CG | Canada | Asüna/Pontiac SUV made by CAMI Automotive only sold by GM Canada |
| 2CK | Canada | GMC Tracker SUV made by CAMI Automotive only sold by GM Canada 1990–1991 only |
| 2CK | Canada | Pontiac Torrent SUV made by CAMI Automotive 2006–2009 only |
| 2CM | Canada | American Motors Corporation car |
| 2CN | Canada | Geo/Chevrolet SUV made by CAMI Automotive 1990–2011 only |
| 2CT | Canada | GMC Terrain SUV made by CAMI Automotive 2010–2011 only |
| 2D4 | Canada | Dodge MPV 2003–2011 only |
| 2D6 | Canada | Dodge incomplete vehicle 2003 |
| 2D7 | Canada | Dodge truck 2003 |
| 2D8 | Canada | Dodge MPV 2003–2011 only |
| 2DG | Canada | Ontario Drive & Gear |
| 2E3 | Canada | Eagle car 1989–1997 (using Chrysler-style VIN structure) |
| 2E4 | Canada | Lancia MPV |
| 2F | Canada | Ford |
| 2FA | Canada | Ford car |
| 2FM | Canada | Ford MPV/SUV |
| 2FT | Canada | Ford truck |
| 2FU 2FV | Canada | Freightliner Trucks |
| 2FW | Canada | Sterling Trucks truck |
| 2FY | Canada | New Flyer |
| 2FZ | Canada | Sterling Trucks incomplete vehicle |
| 2Gx | Canada | General Motors |
| 2G0 | Canada | GMC "bus" (van with more than 3 rows of seats) 1981–1986 |
| 2G1 | Canada | Chevrolet |
| 2G2 | Canada | Pontiac |
| 2G3 | Canada | Oldsmobile car |
| 2G4 | Canada | Buick |
| 2G5 | Canada | GMC MPV 1981–1986; BrightDrop Zevo delivery van |
| 2G6 | Canada | Cadillac |
| 2G7 | Canada | Pontiac car only sold by GM Canada |
| 2G8 | Canada | Chevrolet MPV 1981–1986 |
| 2G9 | Canada | Gnome Homes |
| 2GA | Canada | Chevrolet "bus" (van with more than 3 rows of seats) |
| 2GB | Canada | Chevrolet incomplete vehicles |
| 2GC | Canada | Chevrolet truck |
| 2GD | Canada | GMC incomplete vehicles |
| 2GE | Canada | Cadillac incomplete vehicle |
| 2GH | Canada | GMC GM New Look bus & GM Classic series bus |
| 2GJ | Canada | GMC "bus" (van with more than 3 rows of seats) 1987– |
| 2GK | Canada | GMC MPV/SUV 1987– |
| 2GN | Canada | Chevrolet MPV/SUV 1987- |
| 2GT | Canada | GMC truck |
| 2HG | Canada | Honda car made by Honda of Canada Manufacturing |
| 2HH | Canada | Acura car made by Honda of Canada Manufacturing |
| 2HJ | Canada | Honda truck made by Honda of Canada Manufacturing |
| 2HK | Canada | Honda MPV/SUV made by Honda of Canada Manufacturing |
| 2HM | Canada | Hyundai |
| 2HN | Canada | Acura SUV made by Honda of Canada Manufacturing |
| 2HS | Canada | International Trucks truck |
| 2HT | Canada | International Trucks incomplete vehicle |
| 2J4 | Canada | Jeep Wrangler (YJ) 1989–1992 (using Chrysler-style VIN structure) |
| 2L1 | Canada | Lincoln incomplete vehicle – limo |
| 2L9 | Canada | Les Contenants Durabac |
| 2LJ | Canada | Lincoln incomplete vehicle – hearse |
| 2LM | Canada | Lincoln SUV |
| 2LN | Canada | Lincoln car |
| 2M1 2M2 | Canada | Mack Trucks |
| 2ME | Canada | Mercury car |
| 2MG | Canada | Motor Coach Industries (Produced from Sept. 1, 2008 on) |
| 2MR | Canada | Mercury MPV |
| 2NK | Canada | Kenworth incomplete vehicle |
| 2NP | Canada | Peterbilt incomplete vehicle |
| 2NV | Canada | Nova Bus |
| 2P3 | Canada | Plymouth car |
| 2P4 | Canada | Plymouth MPV 1981–2000 |
| 2P5 | Canada | Plymouth "bus" (van with more than 3 rows of seats) 1981–1983 |
| 2P9 001 | Canada | Prevost 1981–1995 |
| 2PC | Canada | Prevost 1996- |
| 2S2 | Canada | Suzuki car made by CAMI Automotive |
| 2S3 | Canada | Suzuki SUV made by CAMI Automotive |
| 2T1 | Canada | Toyota car |
| 2T2 | Canada | Lexus SUV |
| 2T3 | Canada | Toyota SUV |
| 2V4 2V8 | Canada | Volkswagen Routan |
| 2WK | Canada | Western Star Trucks truck |
| 2WL 2WM | Canada | Western Star Trucks incomplete vehicle |
| 2XK | Canada | Kenworth truck |
| 2XM | Canada | Eagle Premier 1988 only (using AMC-style VIN structure) |
| 2XP | Canada | Peterbilt truck |
| 3A4 3A8 | Mexico | Chrysler brand MPV 2006–2010 only |
| 3AK 3AL | Mexico | Freightliner Trucks |
| 3AV | Mexico | BMW Mexico 1999-2009 |
| 3B3 | Mexico | Dodge car 1981–2011 |
| 3B4 | Mexico | Dodge SUV 1986–1993 |
| 3B6 | Mexico | Dodge incomplete vehicle 1981–2002 |
| 3B7 | Mexico | Dodge truck 1981–2002 |
| 3BJ | Mexico | Western Star 3700 truck made by DINA S.A. |
| 3BK | Mexico | Kenworth incomplete vehicle |
| 3BM | Mexico | Motor Coach Industries bus made by DINA S.A. |
| 3BP | Mexico | Peterbilt incomplete vehicle |
| 3C3 | Mexico | Chrysler brand car 1981–2011 |
| 3C3 | Mexico | Chrysler Group (all brands) car (including Fiat) 2012- |
| 3C4 | Mexico | Chrysler brand MPV 2001–2005 |
| 3C4 | Mexico | Chrysler Group (all brands) MPV (including Fiat) 2012- |
| 3C6 | Mexico | Chrysler Group (all brands) truck 2012– |
| 3C7 | Mexico | Chrysler Group (all brands) incomplete vehicle 2012– |
| 3C8 | Mexico | Chrysler brand MPV 2001–2005 |
| 3CE | Mexico | Volvo Buses de Mexico |
| 3CV | Mexico | PJ Trailers |
| 3CZ | Mexico | Honda SUV |
| 3D2 | Mexico | Dodge incomplete vehicle 2007–2009 |
| 3D3 | Mexico | Dodge truck 2006–2009 |
| 3D4 | Mexico | Dodge SUV 2009–2011 |
| 3D6 | Mexico | Dodge incomplete vehicle 2003–2011 |
| 3D7 | Mexico | Dodge truck 2002–2011 |
| 3E4 | Mexico | Fiat SUV |
| 3F | Mexico | Ford |
| 3F6 | Mexico | Sterling Bullet |
| 3FA | Mexico | Ford car |
| 3FC | Mexico | Ford stripped chassis made by Ford & IMMSA |
| 3FM | Mexico | Ford MPV/SUV |
| 3FN 3FR | Mexico | Ford F-650/F-750 made by Blue Diamond Truck Co. |
| 3FT | Mexico | Ford truck |
| 3G | Mexico | General Motors |
| 3G0 | Mexico | Saab 9-4X 2011 |
| 3G0 | Mexico | Holden Equinox 2018–2020 |
| 3G1 | Mexico | Chevrolet car |
| 3G2 | Mexico | Pontiac car |
| 3G4 | Mexico | Buick car |
| 3G5 | Mexico | Buick SUV |
| 3G7 | Mexico | Pontiac SUV |
| 3GC | Mexico | Chevrolet truck |
| 3GK | Mexico | GMC SUV |
| 3GM | Mexico | Holden Suburban |
| 3GN | Mexico | Chevrolet SUV |
| 3GS | Mexico | Saturn SUV |
| 3GT | Mexico | GMC truck |
| 3GY | Mexico | Cadillac SUV |
| 3H1 | Mexico | Honda motorcycle/UTV |
| 3H3 | Mexico | Hyundai de Mexico, S.A. de C.V. for Hyundai Translead (truck trailers) |
| 3HA | Mexico | International Trucks incomplete vehicle |
| 3HC | Mexico | International Trucks truck |
| 3HG | Mexico | Honda car |
| 3HS | Mexico | International Trucks & Caterpillar Trucks truck |
| 3HT | Mexico | International Trucks & Caterpillar Trucks incomplete vehicle |
| 3JB | Mexico | Can-Am ATV/UTV & Can-Am Ryker |
| 3KP | Mexico | Kia/Hyundai car |
| 3LN | Mexico | Lincoln car |
| 3MD | Mexico | Mazda car |
| 3ME | Mexico | Mercury car |
| 3MV | Mexico | Mazda SUV |
| 3MW | Mexico | BMW |
| 3MY | Mexico | Toyota car made by Mazda de Mexico Vehicle Operation |
| 3MZ | Mexico | Mazda car |
| 3N1 | Mexico | Nissan car |
| 3N6 | Mexico | Nissan truck & Chevrolet City Express |
| 3N8 | Mexico | Nissan MPV |
| 3NE | Mexico | Polaris Inc. ATV |
| 3NS | Mexico | Polaris Inc. UTV |
| 3P3 | Mexico | Plymouth car |
| 3PC | Mexico | Infiniti SUV made by COMPAS |
| 3TM | Mexico | Toyota truck made by TMMBC |
| 3TY | Mexico | Toyota truck made by TMMGT |
| 3VV | Mexico | Volkswagen SUV |
| 3VW | Mexico | Volkswagen car |
| 3WK | Mexico | Kenworth truck |
| 3WP | Mexico | Peterbilt truck |
| 4A3 | United States | Mitsubishi Motors car |
| 4A4 | United States | Mitsubishi Motors SUV |
| 4B3 | United States | Dodge car made by Diamond-Star Motors factory |
| 4B9 038 | United States | BYD Coach & Bus LLC |
| 4C3 | United States | Chrysler car made by Diamond-Star Motors factory |
| 4C9 561 | United States | Czinger |
| 4CD | United States | Oshkosh Chassis Division incomplete vehicle (RV chassis) |
| 4DR | United States | IC Bus |
| 4E3 | United States | Eagle car made by Diamond-Star Motors factory |
| 4F2 | United States | Mazda SUV made by Ford |
| 4F4 | United States | Mazda truck made by Ford |
| 4G1 | United States | Chevrolet Cavalier convertible made by Genasys L.C. – a GM/ASC joint venture |
| 4G2 | United States | Pontiac Sunfire convertible made by Genasys L.C. – a GM/ASC joint venture |
| 4G3 | United States | Toyota Cavalier made by GM |
| 4G5 | United States | General Motors EV1 |
| 4GD | United States | WhiteGMC Brigadier 1988–1989 made by GM |
| 4GD | United States | Opel Sintra |
| 4GL | United States | Buick incomplete vehicle |
| 4GT | United States | Isuzu incomplete vehicle built by GM |
| 4JG | United States | Mercedes-Benz SUV |
| 4KB | United States | Chevrolet W-Series incomplete vehicle (gas engine only) |
| 4KD | United States | GMC W-Series incomplete vehicle (gas engine only) |
| 4KL | United States | Isuzu commercial truck built by GM |
| 4M2 | United States | Mercury MPV/SUV |
| 4ML | United States | Oshkosh Trailer Division |
| 4MZ | United States | Buell Motorcycle Company |
| 4N2 | United States | Nissan Quest made by Ford |
| 4NU | United States | Isuzu Ascender made by GM |
| 4P1 | United States | Pierce Manufacturing |
| 4P3 | United States | Plymouth car made by Diamond-Star Motors factory 1990–1994 |
| 4P3 | United States | Mitsubishi Motors SUV made by Mitsubishi Motor Manufacturing of America 2013–2015 for export only |
| 4RK | United States | Nova Bus & Prevost made by Nova Bus (US) Inc. |
| 4S1 | United States | Isuzu truck made by Subaru Isuzu Automotive |
| 4S2 | United States | Isuzu SUV made by Subaru Isuzu Automotive |
| 4S3 | United States | Subaru car |
| 4S4 | United States | Subaru SUV/MPV |
| 4S6 | United States | Honda SUV made by Subaru Isuzu Automotive |
| 4S7 | United States | Spartan Motors incomplete vehicle |
| 4S9 197 | United States | Smith Electric Vehicles US Corp. |
| 4S9 419 | United States | Spartan Motors truck |
| 4S9 454 | United States | Scuderia Cameron Glickenhaus car |
| 4S9 542 | United States | Scuderia Cameron Glickenhaus SCG Boot (M.P.V.) |
| 4S9 544 | United States | Scuderia Cameron Glickenhaus car |
| 4S9 559 | United States | Spartan Fire, LLC truck (formerly Spartan ER) |
| 4S9 560 | United States | Spartan Fire, LLC incomplete vehicle (formerly Spartan ER) |
| 4T1 | United States | Toyota car made by Toyota Motor Manufacturing Kentucky |
| 4T3 | United States | Toyota MPV/SUV made by Toyota Motor Manufacturing Kentucky |
| 4T4 | United States | Toyota car made by Subaru of Indiana Automotive |
| 4T9 208 | United States | Xos, Inc. |
| 4TA | United States | Toyota truck made by NUMMI |
| 4UF | United States | Arctic Cat |
| 4US | United States | BMW car |
| 4UZ | United States | Freightliner Custom Chassis Corporation & gas-powered Mitsubishi Fuso trucks assembled by Freightliner Custom Chassis & Thomas Built Buses FS-65 & Saf-T-Liner C2 |
| 4V1 | United States | WhiteGMC truck |
| 4V2 | United States | WhiteGMC incomplete vehicle |
| 4V4 | United States | Volvo Trucks North America truck |
| 4V5 | United States | Volvo Trucks North America incomplete vehicle |
| 4VA 4VG | United States | Volvo Trucks North America truck |
| 4VE 4VH 4VM | United States | Volvo Trucks North America incomplete vehicle |
| 4VZ | United States | Spartan Motors/The Shyft Group incomplete vehicle – bare chassis only |
| 4XA | United States | Polaris Inc. |
| 4YD | United States | Keystone RV |
| 4YM | United States | Carry-On Trailer, Inc. |
| 4Z3 | United States | American LaFrance truck |
| 43C | United States | Consulier |
| 46G | United States | Gillig incomplete vehicle |
| 478 | United States | Honda ATV |
| 480 | United States | Sterling Trucks truck |
| 49H | United States | Sterling Trucks incomplete vehicle |
| 5AS | United States | GEM |
| 5B4 | United States | Workhorse Custom Chassis, LLC incomplete vehicle (RV chassis) |
| 5BZ | United States | Nissan "bus" (van with more than 3 rows of seats) |
| 5CD | United States | Indian Motorcycle Company of America Gilroy, CA |
| 5CX | United States | Shelby Series 1 |
| 5DF | United States | Thomas Dennis Company LLC |
| 5EH | United States | Excelsior-Henderson Motorcycle |
| 5FN | United States | Honda MPV/SUV made by Honda Manufacturing of Alabama |
| 5FP | United States | Honda truck made by Honda Manufacturing of Alabama |
| 5FR | United States | Acura SUV made by Honda Manufacturing of Alabama |
| 5FY | United States | New Flyer |
| 5G8 | United States | Holden Volt |
| 5GA | United States | Buick MPV/SUV |
| 5GD | United States | Daewoo G2X |
| 5GN | United States | Hummer H3T |
| 5GR | United States | Hummer H2 |
| 5GT | United States | Hummer H3 |
| 5GZ | United States | Saturn MPV/SUV |
| 5HD | United States | Harley-Davidson for export markets |
| 5J6 | United States | Honda SUV made by Honda of America Mfg. in Ohio |
| 5J8 | United States | Acura SUV made by Honda of America Mfg. in Ohio |
| 5KB | United States | Honda car made by Honda Manufacturing of Alabama |
| 5KJ 5KK | United States | Western Star Trucks truck |
| 5L1 | United States | Lincoln SUV (2004–2009) |
| 5LD | United States | Ford & Lincoln incomplete vehicle – limousine (2010–2014) |
| 5LM | United States | Lincoln SUV |
| 5LT | United States | Lincoln truck |
| 5MZ | United States | Buell Motorcycle Company for export markets |
| 5N1 | United States | Nissan & Infiniti SUV |
| 5N3 | United States | Infiniti SUV |
| 5NM | United States | Hyundai SUV |
| 5NP | United States | Hyundai car |
| 5NT | United States | Hyundai truck |
| 5PV | United States | Hino incomplete vehicle |
| 5S3 | United States | Saab 9-7X |
| 5SA | United States | Suzuki ATV |
| 5SX | United States | American LaFrance incomplete vehicle (Condor) |
| 5TB | United States | Toyota truck made by TMMI |
| 5TD | United States | Toyota MPV/SUV made by TMMI |
| 5TE | United States | Toyota truck made by NUMMI |
| 5TF | United States | Toyota truck made by TMMTX |
| 5UM | United States | BMW M car |
| 5UX | United States | BMW SUV |
| 5VC | United States | Autocar incomplete vehicle |
| 5VP | United States | Victory Motorcycles |
| 5WE | United States | IC Bus incomplete vehicle |
| 5WT | United States | Aptera solar EV |
| 5XX | United States | Kia car |
| 5XY | United States | Kia/Hyundai SUV |
| 5Y2 | United States | Pontiac Vibe made by NUMMI |
| 5Y4 | United States | Yamaha Motor Company ATV, UTV |
| 5YA | United States | Indian Motorcycle Company Kings Mountain, NC |
| 5YF | United States | Toyota car made by TMMMS |
| 5YJ | United States | Tesla |
| 5YM | United States | BMW M SUV |
| 5Z6 | United States | Suzuki truck made by Nissan |
| 50E | United States | Lucid Motors |
| 50G | United States | Karma Automotive |
| 516 | United States | Autocar truck |
| 51R | United States | Brammo Motorcycles |
| 523 | United States | VPG |
| 52C | United States | GEM subsidiary of Polaris Inc. |
| 538 | United States | Zero Motorcycles |
| 53G | United States | Coda Automotive |
| 53T | United States | Think North America in Elkhart, IN |
| 546 | United States | EBR |
| 54C | United States | Winnebago Industries trailer |
| 54D | United States | Isuzu & Chevrolet commercial trucks built by Spartan Motors/The Shyft Group |
| 55S | United States | Mercedes-Benz car |
| 56K | United States | Indian Motorcycle International, LLC Polaris subsidiary |
| 57W | United States | Mobility Ventures |
| 57X | United States | Polaris Slingshot |
| 58A | United States | Lexus car made by TMMK |
=== Oceania ===
| 6F1 | Australia | Ford |
| 6F2 | Australia | Iveco Trucks Australia Ltd. |
| 6F4 | Australia | Nissan Motor Australia |
| 6F5 | Australia | Kenworth Australia |
| 6FM | Australia | Mack Trucks Australia |
| 6FP | Australia | Ford |
| 6G | Australia | General Motors |
| 6G1 | Australia | Holden & Chevrolet |
| 6G2 | Australia | Pontiac |
| 6G3 | Australia | Chevrolet |
| 6H | Australia | Holden |
| 6MM | Australia | Mitsubishi |
| 6MP | Australia | Mercury Capri |
| 6T1 | Australia | Toyota |
| 6T9 | Australia | Trailer |
| 6U9 | Australia | Low volume (grey) import vehicles which do not have 17-digit VIN. Uses NON ISO VIN with "Filler 0's between WMI & Non Iso VIN – I.e Japanese VIN PV35-400637 would become 6U90000PV35400637 |
| 6ZZ | Australia | Low volume (grey) import vehicles which do not have 17-digit VIN. Uses NON ISO VIN with "Filler 0's between WMI & Non Iso VIN – I.e Japanese VIN PV35-400637 would become 6ZZ0000PV35400637 |
| 7A1 | New Zealand | Mitsubishi |
| 7A3 | New Zealand | Honda |
| 7A4 | New Zealand | Toyota |
| 7A5 | New Zealand | Ford |
| 7A7 | New Zealand | Nissan New Zealand |
| 7A8 | New Zealand | NZ Transport Agency (pre-2009) |
| 7AT | New Zealand | NZ Transport Agency (post–2009) |
=== North America ===
| 7FA | United States | Honda SUV made by Honda Manufacturing of Indiana |
| 7FC | United States | Rivian truck |
| 7GZ | United States | GMC incomplete vehicles made by Navistar International |
| 7G2 | United States | Tesla Cybertruck & Tesla Semi |
| 7H4 | United States | Hino truck |
| 7JR | United States | Volvo Cars car |
| 7JZ | United States | Proterra From mid-2019 on |
| 7KG | United States | Vanderhall Motor Works |
| 7MM | United States | Mazda SUV made by MTMUS (Mazda-Toyota Joint Venture) |
| 7MU | United States | Toyota SUV made by MTMUS (Mazda-Toyota Joint Venture) |
| 7NA | United States | Navistar Defense |
| 7NY | United States | Lordstown Motors |
| 7PD | United States | Rivian SUV |
| 7RZ | United States | Electric Last Mile Solutions |
| 7R4 | United States | Icon Electric Vehicles |
| 7SA | United States | Tesla SUV 2022+ |
| 7SU | United States | Blue Arc electric trucks made by The Shyft Group |
| 7SV | United States | Toyota SUV made by TMMTX |
| 7SX | United States | Global Electric Motorcars |
| 7YA | United States | Hyundai Ioniq SUV made by HMGMA |
| 7Z0 | United States | Zoox |
=== South America ===
| 8AC | Argentina | Mercedes-Benz vans (for South America) |
| 8AD | Argentina | Peugeot |
| 8AE | Argentina | Peugeot van |
| 8AF | Argentina | Ford Motor Argentina |
| 8AG | Argentina | General Motors de Argentina Chevrolet |
| 8AJ | Argentina | Toyota Argentina |
| 8AN | Argentina | Nissan |
| 8AP | Argentina | Fiat |
| 8AT | Argentina | Iveco |
| 8AW | Argentina | Volkswagen Argentina |
| 8A1 | Argentina | Renault Argentina |
| 8A3 | Argentina | Scania Argentina |
| 8BB | Argentina | Agrale Argentina S.A |
| 8BC | Argentina | Citroën |
| 8BN | Argentina | Mercedes-Benz incomplete vehicle (North America) |
| 8BR | Argentina | Mercedes-Benz "bus" (van with more than 3 rows of seats) (North America) |
| 8BT | Argentina | Mercedes-Benz MPV (van with 2 or 3 rows of seats) (North America) |
| 8BU | Argentina | Mercedes-Benz truck (cargo van with 1 row of seats) (North America) |
| 8CH | Argentina | Honda motorcycle |
| 8C3 | Argentina | Honda car/SUV |
| 8F9 | Chile | Reborn Electric Motors SPA |
| 8G1 | Chile | Automotores Franco Chilena S.A Renault |
| 8GD | Chile | Automotores Franco Chilena S.A Peugeot |
| 8GG | Chile | General Motors Chile Ltda. |
| 8L4 | Ecuador | Great Wall Motors made by Ciudad del Auto Ciauto Cia. Ltda. |
| 8LB | Ecuador | General Motors OBB |
| 8LF | Ecuador | Maresa (Mazda) |
| 8LG | Ecuador | Aymesa (Hyundai Motor & Kia) |
| 8XD | Venezuela | Ford Motor Venezuela |
| 8XJ | Venezuela | Mack de Venezuela C.A. |
| 8XV | Venezuela | Iveco Venezuela C.A. |
| 8Z1 | Venezuela | General Motors Venezolana C.A. |
| 829 | Bolivia | Quantum Motors |
| 9AM | Brazil | Massari (?) |
| 9BD | Brazil | Fiat Automóveis |
| 9BF | Brazil | Ford Brasil |
| 9BG | Brazil | General Motors do Brasil Chevrolet |
| 9BH | Brazil | Hyundai Motor Brasil |
| 9BM | Brazil | Mercedes-Benz car & SUV & commercial truck |
| 9BN | Brazil | Mafersa |
| 9BR | Brazil | Toyota |
| 9BS | Brazil | Scania Brazil |
| 9BV | Brazil | Volvo Trucks |
| 9BW | Brazil | Volkswagen do Brasil |
| 9BY | Brazil | Agrale S.A. |
| 9C2 | Brazil | Honda Motorcycles |
| 9C6 | Brazil | Yamaha Motor |
| 9CD | Brazil | Suzuki (motorcycles) assembled by J. Toledo Motos do Brasil |
| 9DW | Brazil | Kenworth & Peterbilt trucks made by Volkswagen do Brasil |
| 9EZ | Brazil | Homebuilt vehicles |
| 903 | Brazil | Royal Enfield assembled by Grupo Multi |
| 906 | Brazil | PACE (Planta Automotiva do Ceará) |
| 92Z | Brazil | Great Wall Motors |
| 92V | Brazil | BYD cars assembled in Camaçari - Bahia |
| 932 | Brazil | Harley-Davidson |
| 935 | Brazil | Citroën |
| 936 | Brazil | Peugeot |
| 937 | Brazil | Dodge |
| 93C | Brazil | General Motors do Brasil Chevrolet SUV (Mexico) |
| 93H | Brazil | Honda car/SUV |
| 93K | Brazil | Volvo Trucks |
| 93P | Brazil | Volare |
| 93S | Brazil | Navistar International |
| 93U | Brazil | Audi 1999–2006 |
| 93V | Brazil | Navistar International |
| 93W | Brazil | Fiat Ducato made by Iveco 2000–2016 |
| 93X | Brazil | Souza Ramos – Mitsubishi Motors / Suzuki Jimny |
| 93Y | Brazil | Renault do Brasil |
| 93Z | Brazil | Iveco |
| 94D | Brazil | Nissan |
| 94G | Brazil | Indabra |
| 94M | Brazil | HVR-Busscar |
| 94N | Brazil | RWM Brazil |
| 94T | Brazil | Troller Veículos Especiais |
| 953 | Brazil | VW Truck & Bus / MAN Truck & Bus |
| 95P | Brazil | CAOA / Hyundai, Chery, Changan |
| 95V | Brazil | Dafra Motos (motorscooters from SYM) & Ducati, KTM, MV Agusta, BMW Motorrad, Royal Enfield - assembled by Dafra |
| 95Z | Brazil | Buell Motorcycle Company assembled by Harley-Davidson Brazil |
| 96P | Brazil | Kawasaki |
| 97N | Brazil | Triumph Motorcycles Ltd |
| 988 | Brazil | Jeep and Fiat (made at the Goiana plant) |
| 98M | Brazil | BMW car/SUV |
| 98R | Brazil | Chery |
| 99A | Brazil | Audi 2016- |
| 99J | Brazil | Jaguar Land Rover |
| 99K | Brazil | Haojue & Kymco assembled by JTZ Indústria e Comércio de Motos |
| 99L | Brazil | BYD Bus chassis assembled in Campinas - São Paulo |
| 99Z | Brazil | BMW Motorrad Motorcycle assembled by BMW since 2017 |
| 9FB | Colombia | Sofasa (Renault) |
| 9FC | Colombia | Compañía Colombiana Automotriz S.A. (Mazda) |
| 9GA | Colombia | GM Colmotores S.A. (Chevrolet) |
| 9UJ | Uruguay | Chery assembled by Chery Socma S.A. |
| 9UK | Uruguay | Lifan |
| 9UW | Uruguay | Kia made by Nordex S.A. |
| 9V7 | Uruguay | Citroen made by Nordex S.A. |
| 9V8 | Uruguay | Peugeot made by Nordex S.A. |

== See also ==
- Builder's plate
- Danish bicycle VIN-system
- Engine number
- Name plate
- RPO Code
- Serial number
- VIN cloning
- VIN etching
