= Porsche VIN specification =

Vehicle identification number system

The ISO standard vehicle identification number (VIN) was introduced for the Porsche model year 1981.

== Decoding ==
VINs consist of 17 characters and for Porsche can be decoded as follows:-

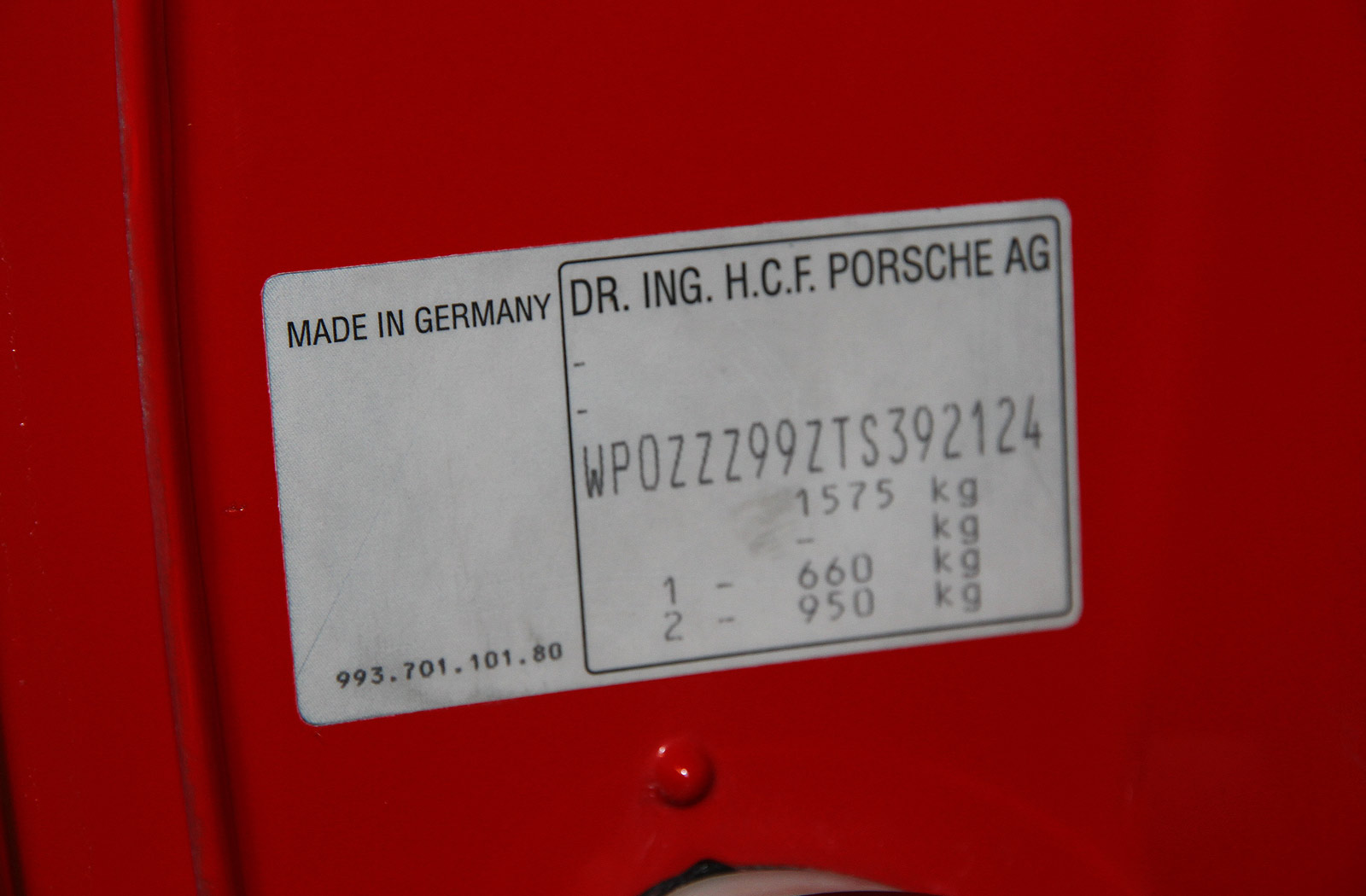
VIN WP0ZZZ99ZTS392124 on a Porsche 993 GT2.

Position	Explanation	North America notes
1	W = German based manufacturer.	
2	P = Porsche.	
3	0 (zero) = Passenger car (applies to all except Cayenne and Macan) or 1 = SUV (applies to Cayenne and Macan).	
4	for RoW = Z (filler)	chassis.
5	for RoW = Z (filler)	engine(0 = none, 2 = at least 2).
6	for RoW = Z (filler)	restraint system.
7	First character of model type (read positions 7,8 and 12 together).	
8	Second character of model type (read positions 7,8 and 12 together).	
9	For RoW = 0-9,X,Z (filler)	Calculated checkdigit.
10	Year code.	
11	Factory code.	
12	Third character of model type (read positions 7,8 and 12 together).	
13	Body configuration code or leading digit of serial number.	
14	First digit of serial number.	
15	Second digit of serial number.	
16	Third digit of serial number.	
17	Fourth digit of serial number.	

== Vehicle Specification for USA etc (positions 4, 5 and 6) ==
VIN has been implemented differently in two regions, they consist of the following countries:-

USA etc. = Countries that follow USA style VIN encoding include USA, Canada, Mexico, India, Kenya, Pakistan, China, Hong Kong, Macao, Brazil, Mexico, Middle East (Qatar, UAE, KSA, etc) and South Korea. Note: Not all of these countries use the Check Digit value. Some of these countries transitioned from a ROW ZZZ encoding to USA style encoding during certain model years and/or models.

RoW = Rest of world. (i.e. everywhere except the above countries). These VINs include the "ZZZ" filler characters.

Vehicle Specification for "USA etc" is a 3 character code giving details of the body type, engine, seatbelts and airbags fitted.

== Examples of model type codes (positions 7, 8 and 12) ==
On 2010+ North America market vehicles, the first digit will be 'A' instead of '9'

- Cayenne = 9PA then 92A
- Panamera = 970
- Boxster = 986, 987, 981, A82, 982
- Cayman = 987, 981, A82, 982
- Carrera GT = 980
- 911 = 901, 930, 964, 993, 996, 997, 991, 992
- 924 = 924
- 924 Turbo = 931
- 924 Carrera GT/GTS/GTR = 937
- 928 = 928
- 944 = 944
- 944 Turbo = 951
- 959 = 959
- 968 = 968
- Taycan = Y1A (sedan), Y1B (cross turismo and sport turismo)

== Year codes (position 10) ==
More properly described as 'Model year'. While the code may indicate a particular year it may well be the 'model year' which could be the subsequent year, for instance a 1994 registered vehicle may well be a model year 1995 on the VIN/chassis number.

Code	Year	---	Code	Year	---	Code	Year	---	Code	Year	---	Code	Year
			L	1990		Y	2000		A	2010		L	2020
B	1981		M	1991		1	2001		B	2011		M	2021
C	1982		N	1992		2	2002		C	2012		N	2022
D	1983		P	1993		3	2003		D	2013		P	2023
E	1984		R	1994		4	2004		E	2014		R	2024
F	1985		S	1995		5	2005		F	2015		S	2025
G	1986		T	1996		6	2006		G	2016		T	2026
H	1987		V	1997		7	2007		H	2017		V	2027
J	1988		W	1998		8	2008		J	2018		W	2028
K	1989		X	1999		9	2009		K	2019		X	2029

== Factory codes (position 11) ==
Code	Factory	Notes	Models produced
S	(Stuttgart) Zuffenhausen - Germany	Includes occasional production from Weissach.	All 911s. Minority of 986 Boxsters, 987 Boxster/Cayman and 981 Boxster. 549 of the 1991 944s, as well as all 924 Carrera GTS/GTR. Majority of 968s. All Taycans.
N	Neckarsulm - Germany.	Audi factory	Majority of 924 and 944s. Minority of 1992 968s.
L	Leipzig - Germany.		All Cayenne, Panamera and Carrera GT.
U	Uusikaupunki - Finland.	Valmet Automotive factory.	Majority of 986 Boxsters and 987 Boxster/Cayman.
K	Osnabrück - Germany.	VW factory, ex-Karmann, hence the "K"	All 981 Caymans. Majority of 981 Boxsters.
D	Bratislava - Slovakia.	VW factory	Cayennes

== Model Configuration Code (position 13) ==
A leading "0" usually means standard coupé, for the RoW markets. For the 944 and 968, US cars are usually identified by a leading "5". 944 convertibles have a leading "3" (RoW) or "8" (US). Sometimes this model code extends into the 14th digit, such as for the 968 CS which had chassis numbers beginning with "15".

== Examples ==
WP0ZZZ94ZFN40**** a 944.

WP0ZZZ98Z7U770439**** a Cayman

WP0ZZZ92ZGN40**** a 924S.

WP1ZZZ9PZ8LA7**** a Cayenne.

WP0ZZZ96ZRS81**** a 968.

WP0ZZZ99Z5S73**** a 911.

WP0ZZZ97ZAL08**** a Panamera.

WP0ZZZ98Z4L00**** a Carrera GT.

WP0ZZZ98Z8U72**** a Boxster S.

WP0ZZZ99Z5S76**** a 911 C2S Convertible.

WP0ZZZ99Z2S64**** a 911 C4 convertible.

WP1AF2A51FLB9**** a Macan Turbo

WP0ZZZ95ZJS90**** a 959

WP1ZZZ9YZLDA3**** a Cayenne E-hybrid

WP0ZZZ99ZKS12**** a Targa 4 GTS

WP0AA2Y18NSA1**** a 2022 Taycan sedan, RWD, for North America

== External ==
- Porsche Build Sheets & VIN Decoder - VIN Analytics
- Porsche VIN decoder.
- Decode Classic Porsche VIN
