= VIN etching =

Vehicle identification method

In the United States, VIN etching is a countermeasure to motor vehicle theft, that involves etching a vehicle's VIN onto its windows to reduce the value of a stolen vehicle to thieves. The Federal Trade Commission includes VIN etching on a list of upsold services including extended warranties, service and maintenance plans, payment programs, guaranteed automobile or asset protection, emergency road service, and other theft protection devices, and warns consumers about the practice of upselling when buying a vehicle.

== Description ==
VIN etching uses a variety of methods, commonly a stencil and an acidic etching paste, to engrave a vehicle's vehicle identification number (VIN) onto the windshield and windows. Most parts on a vehicle already have at least a partial VIN stamped onto them, and many auto parts buyers will not purchase parts that carry identification numbers. Should a thief try to sell the parts from a vehicle for profit, those marked parts carry a higher risk for the thief and the auto parts seller. Since automotive glass generally does not have identification numbers and is often interchangeable among many different years and models of vehicles, it usually yields a much greater profit for a thief compared to other components on the vehicle; because a vehicle's windows are stamped with the VIN, thieves would need to discard the glass before "parting out" the stolen vehicle, thus reducing or eliminating their profit. VIN etching can also increase the odds of recovery of a stolen car by police.

VIN etching is recommended by police departments, insurance agencies, and government automobile/vehicle theft prevention agencies This service is sometimes offered free of charge at sponsored events.

Vehicles with VIN-etched windows may be eligible for insurance rate reductions of as much as 15% in some US states.

Some automobile dealers try to include VIN etching as an extra service to boost their profit margin when selling a vehicle; they may even pre-print a charge for VIN etching on the bill of sale, as if to suggest that VIN etching is mandatory rather than an optional, add-on service. Inflated dealership fees of $200 to $2,000 for VIN etching are not unheard of. However, consumer advocates note that while some states do require that dealers offer VIN etching, no states require that consumers purchase it from the dealer.

Consumers who want to have the VIN etched on their vehicle windows but are unable to find a free of charge etching service in their area can often save hundreds of dollars over the dealership fee by using a do-it-yourself VIN etching kit purchased from an Internet retailer or a local auto parts dealer, for as little as $20–25.
