= VIN cloning =

Use of a different vehicle's ID number

VIN cloning or car cloning is a practice of using a vehicle identification number (VIN) from a legally registered car to hide the identity of a stolen or salvaged vehicle. The procedure involves replacing the serial plate of a stolen or salvage repaired vehicle with a plate containing the number of a validly registered vehicle of similar make, model and year from another state, province or country.

The use of this practice by organized theft rings is partially responsible for the creation of national databases such as the National Motor Vehicle Title Information System in the United States and the Personal Property Securities Register in Australia and New Zealand.

The problem with VIN cloning is potentially very large with the FBI reporting one case in Tampa, Florida, in which more than 1,000 cloned cars were sold to buyers in twenty states and several countries, with estimated losses of more than $27 million to consumers, auto insurers, and other victims. If the purchaser of a cloned vehicle has its true pedigree discovered, the car will be confiscated, and the owner would still be responsible for any outstanding loans.

In some states in the United States, the car dealership may be held responsible. The owner of the legitimately registered vehicle the number belongs to, could potentially be accused of a variety of offenses – from parking tickets to serious criminal activity like organized crime. The victim could spend a great amount of time and money trying to prove that they are not the owner of the cloned vehicle. The practice has also been reported in numerous countries including Canada, the United Kingdom, and Australia.

== United Kingdom ==
In the United Kingdom, the term "car cloning" is frequently used to refer to both full vehicle identity cloning (VIN cloning) and the copying of number plates without altering the vehicle's underlying identity. The latter is typically used to avoid penalty charges, congestion fees, or detection by automatic number plate recognition (ANPR) systems.

Figures obtained by the Driver and Vehicle Licensing Agency (DVLA) show an increase in reports from vehicle keepers receiving fines or penalties for offences committed by vehicles displaying their registration number. In 2024, 10,460 such reports were recorded, up from 7,377 in 2020.
