= Guangzhou Automobile Group Bus =

Chinese bus manufacturer

- Founded: 2008
- Headquarters: Guangzhou, China
- Products: Buses
- Parent: Guangzhou Automobile Group
- Website: www.gacbus.com

Guangzhou Automobile Group Co., Ltd. Bus (GAAC), is the part of the Guangzhou Automobile Group (GAC) that manufactures buses in China.

It was formed in 2008 by merging two divisions of GAC, Guangzhou Denway Bus, Guangzhou Yuelong Bus and Guangzhou Isuzu Bus, into one. Buses are produced using Isuzu technology. They were merged after Isuzu withdrew from its joint venture. The brands (Denway-, Yangcheng- and Isuzu-), are to be integrated into the Guangzhou brand.

== Guangzhou Denway Bus ==
Guangzhou Denway Bus Co Ltd was set up as a 50-50 partnership between Hong Kong China Lounge Investments and Guangzhou Automobile Group.

== Guangzhou Isuzu Bus ==
Guangzhou Isuzu Bus was set up as a joint venture between Isuzu and Guangzhou Automobile Group Co., Ltd. based in Guangdong, China. They manufacture buses under the Guangzhou Isuzu brand. It was established in 2000 with Isuzu holding 49%, and Guangzhou Automobile holding the other 51%. Isuzu withdrew from the joint venture in 2008.

=== Products ===
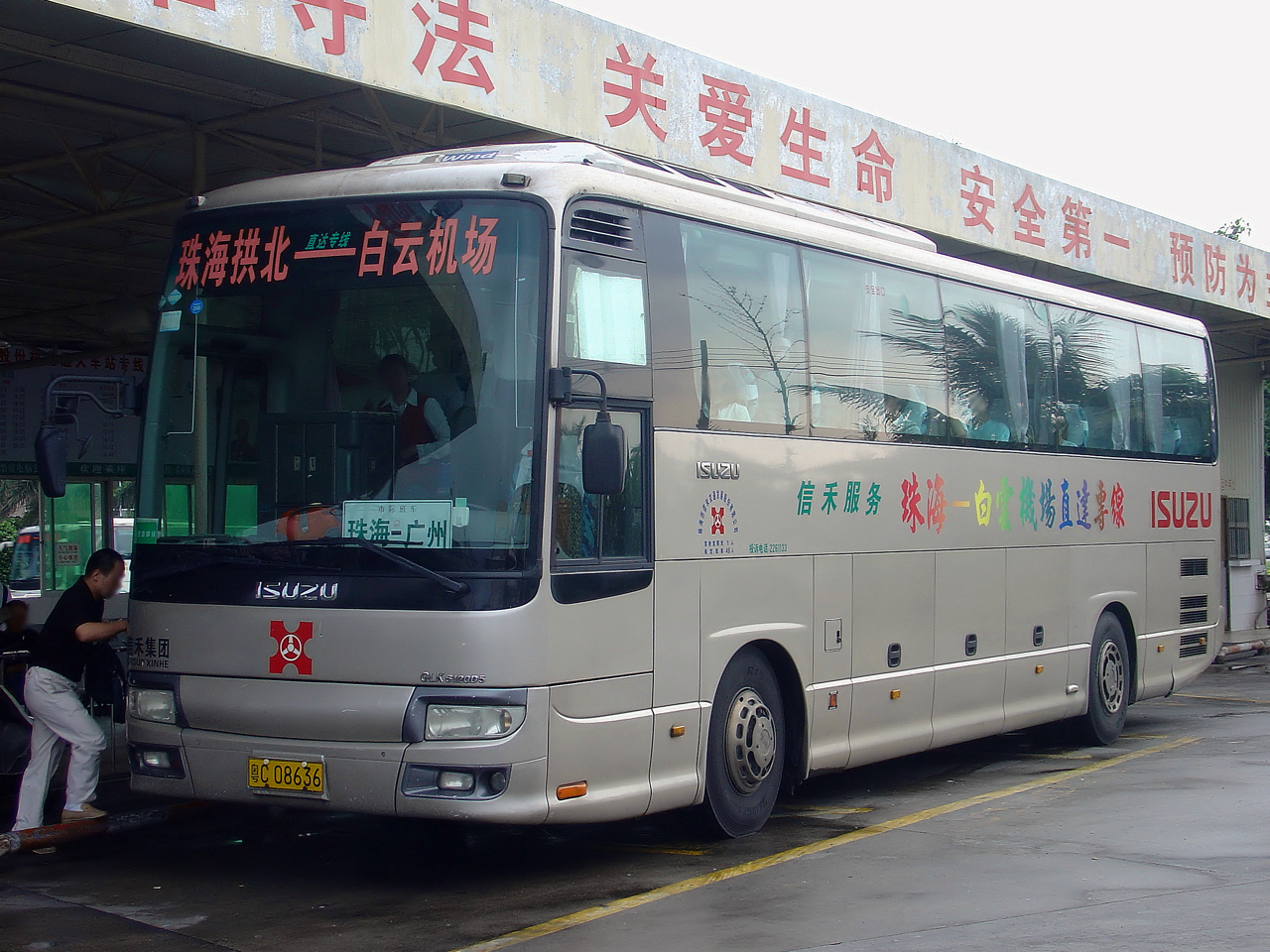
Guangzhou Isuzu Gala bus

- Guangzhou Isuzu Gala bus
