= LML Star =

Model of motor scooter made in India

- Manufacturer: Lohia Machinery Limited
- Also called: LML Star De Luxe, LML Stella , LML NV
- Production: 1999–2017
- Engine: 149.56 cc (9.127 cu in) 2-stroke, air-cooled single
- Transmission: 4-speed manual
- Brakes: Front and rear drum
- Wheelbase: 1,235 mm (48.6 in)
- Weight: 104 kg (229 lb) (dry)
- Fuel capacity: 8 L (1.8 imp gal; 2.1 US gal)
- Related: Vespa PX; Vespa T5

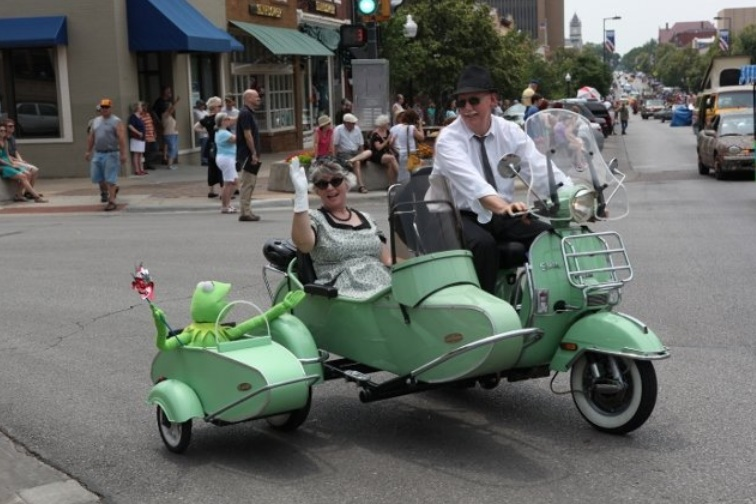
Stella with standard and "additional" sidecar

The LML Star (also known as Star De Luxe in Europe or Stella in United States) is a model motor scooter manufactured by Lohia Machinery Limited in Kanpur, India between 1999 and 2017 and based on the Italian Piaggio Vespa PX.

== History ==
In 1983, LML established a joint venture with Piaggio, forming Vespa Automobile Company Limited to produce Vespa PX (Piaggio brand) and NV3, Alfa, T5, 4W (LML Vespa brand) models for India, starting with a 100 cc scooter and expanding to the Supremo (Vespa Cosa variant) and Select (Vespa T5 replica).

The LML Vespa PX model lacks an automatic lubrication system thus two-stroke oil must be pre-mixed with petrol. An upgraded version of this scooter was called the LML Select 2. Production of the LML NV and LML Select 2 ended in 2004. Up until 2004, the Bajaj Chetak (based on the older Vespa Sprint model) was its chief competitor in the Indian market for 150cc two-stroke scooters.

LML revised production in 2007 and subsequently sold both two-stroke and four-stroke models. There was another model produced by LML, called Vespa A1; unlike other vespas it features split seating. The driver's seat had a spring beneath it and another separate seat for pillion.

The Stella and Vespa P-series scooters share much of their design and engineering and many of their parts are interchangeable. Genuine Scooters was formed to import the scooter to the United States market. Production was interrupted by a labor strike from 2005 to mid-2006 but resumed once the dispute was settled.

Genuine Scooter stopped importing in June 2017 after LML hit financial trouble.

== Characteristics ==
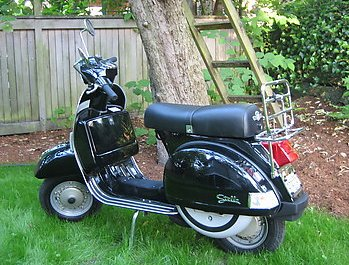
Side

The Stella features a 150 cc (9.2 cu in) two-stroke engine. Like "vintage" European scooters, it operates with a four-speed "twist-grip" manual transmission. Other traditional features include a steel frame, spare tire, and styling.

The 2007 and 2008 models include better quality paint, grips, and a redesigned headlight.

The two-stroke version of the scooter is authorized through Genuine Scooters dealers throughout most of the United States, but not in California due to state regulations. In 2011, Genuine developed a four-stroke version of the Stella which meets California emission standards.
