= Buddy (scooter) =

The Buddy is a motor scooter distributed in the United States by Genuine Scooters of Chicago, Illinois. Introduced in 2006, the Buddy is the most popular scooter sold by Genuine and is sold in 240 of its dealerships throughout the country. It is manufactured by PGO Scooters of Taiwan, and is marketed in similar configurations as the Bubu in Taiwan, the Metro in Canada, and the Ligero in the United Kingdom.

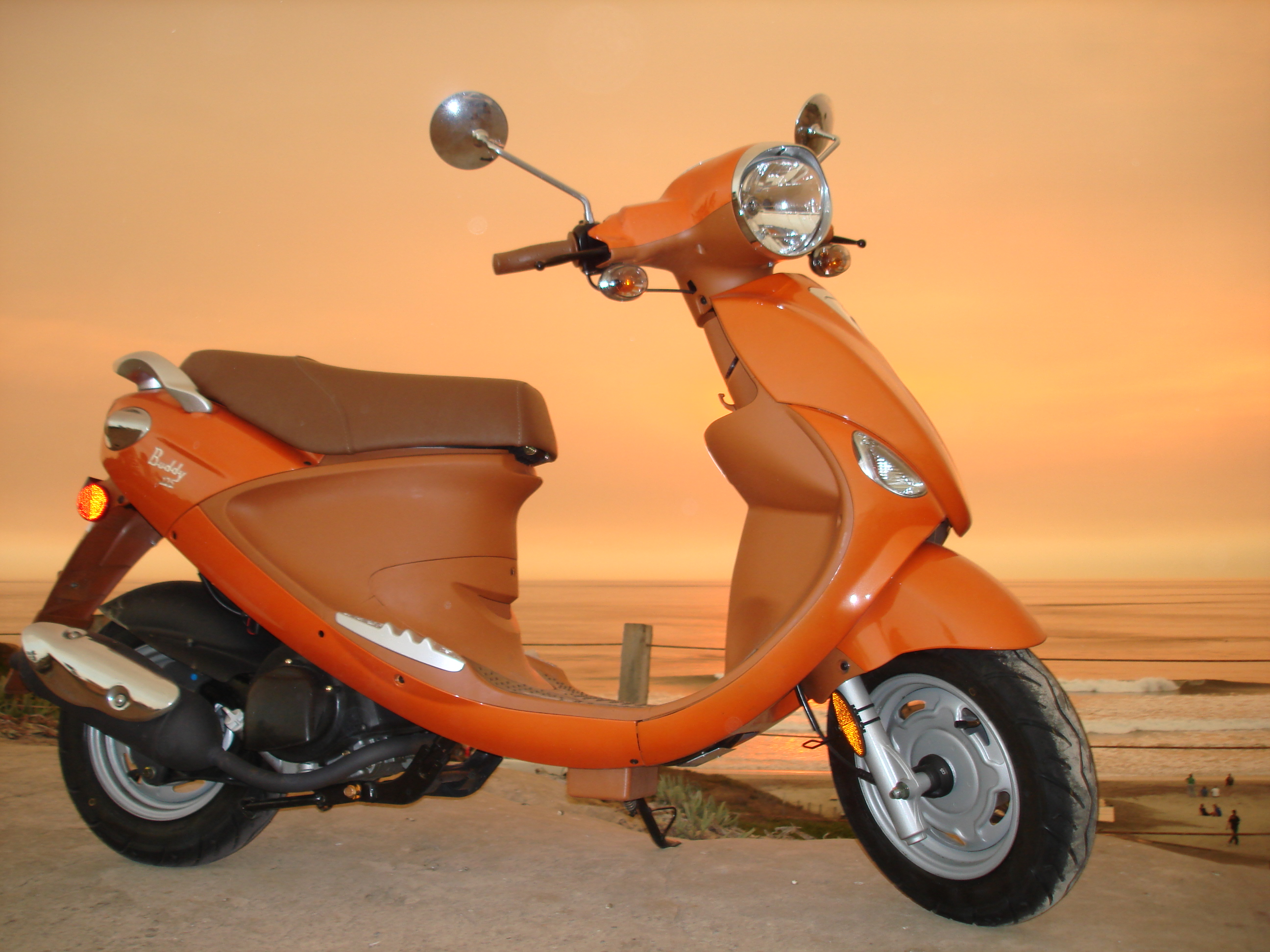
2007 Genuine Buddy

The Buddy features an air-cooled 50 cc two-stroke engine, a larger displacement 125 cc four-stroke engine, or a 168 cc fuel injected model that was introduced in 2011. They all have automatic (CVT) transmissions (twist and go; no shifting). The braking system consists of front disc and rear drum brakes. Models with 150 cc engines as special editions with special trim have been offered.

== Buddy models ==
As of September 2019, the Buddy is offered in the following models:

- Buddy 50 (50 cc)
- Buddy 125 (125 cc)
- Buddy Little International 50 (50 cc)
- Buddy 170i (168 cc)
- Buddy International 170i (168 cc)
- Buddy KICK (125 cc)
