= Lohia Machinery Limited =

Defunct Indian scooter and motorcycle manufacturer

LML
- Company type: Public
- Traded as: BSE: 500255; NSE: LML
- Industry: Motorcycle
- Predecessor: Lohia Machines Ltd
- Founded: 1972; 54 years ago
- Defunct: 2017
- Fate: Insolvent as of 2017
- Headquarters: Kanpur, Uttar Pradesh, India
- Key people: Deepak Singhania (Chairman & Managing Director); K K Shangloo Director
- Products: Scooters, motorcycles
- Revenue: ₹264 crore (US$28 million) 2009–2011

LML (formerly Lohia Machines Ltd) was an Indian scooter and motorcycle manufacturer formerly based in Kanpur, Uttar Pradesh.

== History and overview ==
Incorporated as Lohia Machines Private Limited in 1972, the company was engaged in manufacture of synthetic yarn manufacturing machines in technical collaboration with ARCT, France. In 1978, it became a public limited company and diversified into processing synthetic yarn.

In 1984 a technical collaboration agreement was signed with Piaggio of Italy and a scooter project was set up. The relationship with Piaggio was redefined to that of a partner in 1990, both partners having equal equity participation of 23.6% each.

The first model produced was a scooter powered by a 100 cc engine; the range was soon expanded with the LML Supremo, the Indian version of the Vespa Cosa, and in the 1993 the LML Select, a replica of the Vespa T5, with new age technology and aesthetics, and became an instant success.

From the joint venture between LML and Piaggio, the Vespa Automobile Company Limited was established as a subsidiary responsible for producing Piaggio-branded Vespa PX scooters for the domestic market and, under the LML Vespa brand, the NV3, Alfa, T5 and 4W models. Through this agreement, LML acquired the tooling, know-how and components required to assemble Vespa PX scooters within the local market.

The LML Select was launched in LML's joint venture with Piaggio ended in 1999. LML continued to manufacture the Star, a classically styled steel-bodied scooter with twist-shift 4-speed manual transmission and a 150cc two-stroke engine.

Some of these were distributed in United States as the Stella and in the UK as A.K. International (AKII). AKII's Aura LML & A.K. International (I&E) Ltd was appointed the sole distributor for UK In 2008. Star Deluxe was re-introduced to the U.K. market by AKII (I&E) Ltd, with the Via Toscana as the Euro 3 emissions compliant model.

LML also produced the Trendy 50 cc (1998–2006), formerly known as Benelli Scooty (1993), a derivation from 1981 Benelli S50. That little scooter had no parts in common with Piaggio, being a Benelli project (engine included).

Again in 1999, an agreement was signed with Daelim Motor Company of South Korea to manufacture four-stroke motorcycles. In 2000 the company was recognized by the Indian Ministry of Science and Technology for remarkable success in introducing new models/upgrades of scooters in the market with more fuel-efficient engines, new electrical systems, latest emission norms, upgraded technology, better styling etc., and that year entered the motorcycle market with upper end lifestyle bikes in 100 cc, using three-valve technology.

LML's first deluxe commuter motorcycle Freedom was launched in 2001 & that same year, LML launched its superbike named Adreno. Adreno was popularly used by Maharashtra Police's Traffic Patrol Squad on Mumbai-Pune Expressway. In 2004, LML introduced LML Graptor, marking its entry into the 150 cc lifestyle segment. It was the first indigenously designed bike in technical collaboration with Ugolini of Italy. 2004 marked LML's transition from a single product company to a multi-product two-wheeler company with three simultaneous launches: the Graptor XL (150 cc), the Freedom Prima (110 cc) and Freedom Prima (125 cc).

Owing to excesses and over-spending, the company has been under financial constraints ever since its foray into bi-wheeler manufacturing, with dividend being declared only twice to its shareholders in spite of contemporary bi-wheeler manufacturers like TVS, Hero and Bajaj Auto not only growing multifold but also enhancing shareholders' worth. Even new entrants into the scooter market like Honda and Suzuki have achieved volumes of 50,000 units per month, which LML could never achieve with its full range of Scooters and motor-cycles. The bankruptcy has dealt a severe blow to SSI units in Kanpur, who were engaged in feeding critical and propriety items to LML since early 1980s, with many closing down or facing huge financial burden on themselves.

New finance were obtained from Credit Suisse July 2006 and other institutions and the factory reopened on 8 March 2008 to manufacture geared Vespa style scooters, primarily for export. In the year 2008, LML appointed K K Shangloo as Special Director on the Board of Company under the provisions of Sick Industrial Companies (Special Provisions) Act, 1985.

In the year 2009 LML launched the 4 stroke scooter which was identical to the 2 stroke counterpart, but had a different internal mechanism with 4 stroke engine.

In the year 2013, LML relaunched LML Freedom DX, a 110 cc bike in the Commuter category.

In the year 2016, LML launched the Star 125 Lite automatic version on a small frame. It also launched the 150 cc variant of the automatic as Star Euro 150. Star Euro 200 a geared version of the four stroke was also launched.

Around 2016, LML launched its three-wheeler the LML Buddy.

LML issued a notice of insolvency on 2 June 2017.

As of August 2020, the factory has been dismantled completely, spares, machines and scooters scrapped, toolings partly sold to SIP scooter shop of Germany.

== See also ==
- List of motor scooter manufacturers and brands
