= Vespa Cosa =

Model of scooter produced by Piaggio

The Vespa Cosa is a model of scooter produced by Piaggio under the Vespa brand. It was in production from 1988 to 1993.

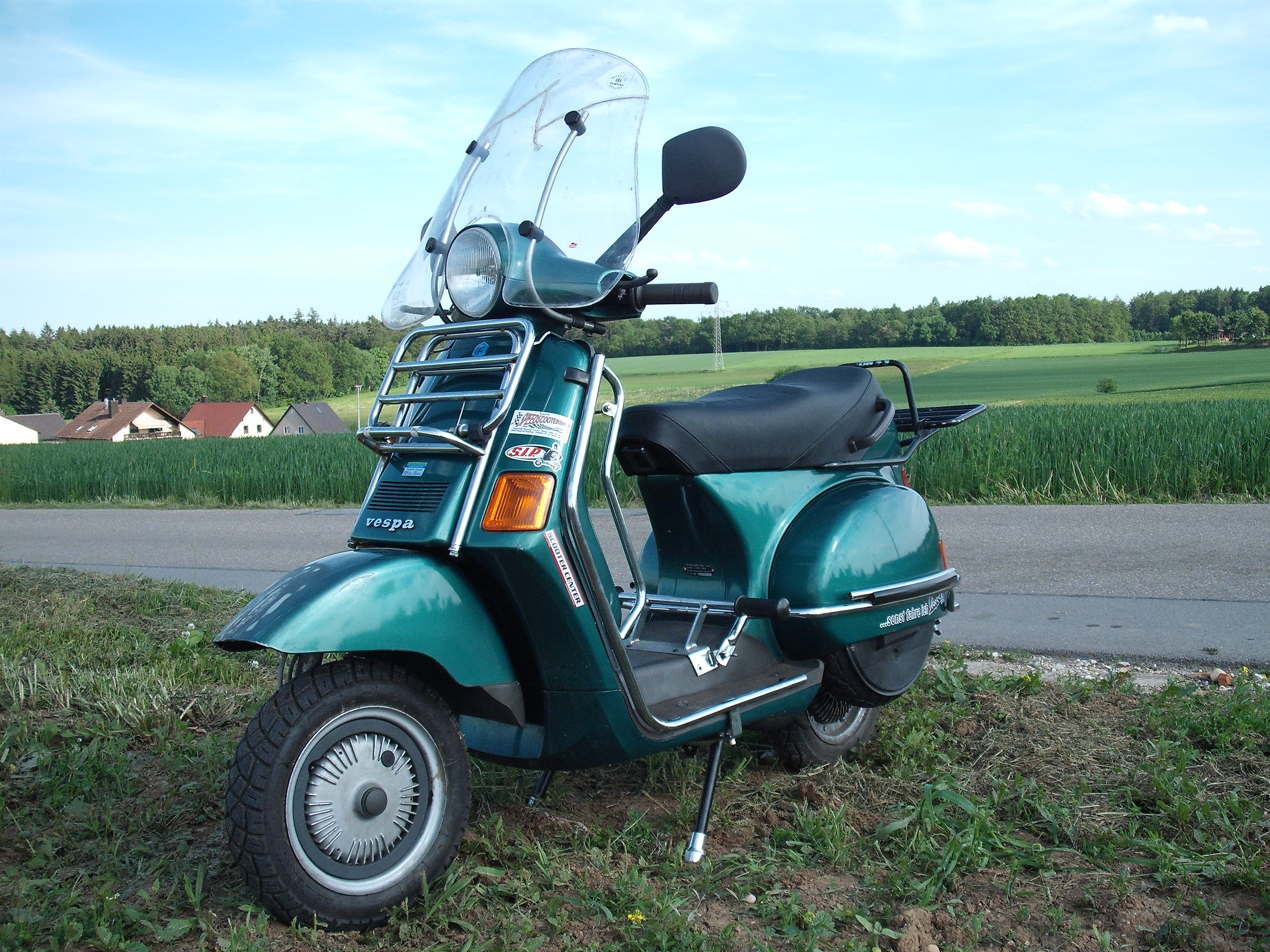
A second generation Vespa Cosa with aftermarket luggage rack and crash bars.

== History ==
The Vespa Cosa was initially to be called the Vespa R (standing for Rinnovata, meaning "renewed"). It was unveiled at the Milan Motorcycle Show in 1987. The Cosa is a direct successor to the Vespa PX series, and although the internal workings are largely similar, it came with newly developed gearbox that was a significant improvement upon the gearbox that had previously been used in the PX series. The PX series was still in production at the time, however, and has continued production even after Cosa production was discontinued. Other improvements upon the PX series included storage space beneath the seat and anti-lock brakes on the front wheel. More controversially, it was also the first Vespa to utilise a significant amount of plastic parts in addition to the traditional monocoque pressed steel frame.

The series is broadly divided into two generations. The first generation was built from 1988 to 1991, while the second generation (sometimes referred to as the Cosa FL) was in production from 1992 onwards. Both version are fundamentally the same, with some minor differences. Firstly, the clutch was modified so that it would be easier to pull in and release. Secondly, minor design alterations were made: the tail light was slightly different and moved to a new position, the seat lock was installed on the side of the saddle, and the saddle was widened for extra comfort.

== Cosa 1 - VNR1T ==
At the end of the 80s was decided to make the PX line more modern with decidedly more angular shapes. It was thus decided to put into production a new model "Cosa". The instrumentation of this new model is particularly equipped, the engine more powerful, the rear swinging arm is strengthened, and also includes a rev counter. As regards the chassis, the greater space available to put the legs and the possibility of putting the helmet under the saddle compartment should be noted. The "Cosa" maintains the monocoque body but present in several innovations compared to the Vespa PX models: the side hoods are slightly inclined forward for a better aerodynamic effect, the indicators are recessed in the front shield, while the rear light is recessed under the plate. Braking is integral, distributed on both wheels through the use of a hydraulic circuit and a pressure regulator. It is placed on the market with a price of about 3,147,000 Italian lire and colours white, red, green, blue and blue. The chassis number VLR1T 3.000.001 - 3.009.413

== Cosa 2 - VNR2T ==
The "Cosa 2" was presented at the 1991 Milan Motocycles Show. The price was very high, equal to 4,571,000 Italian lire. The stylistic interventions of the second series are basically highlighted in the back. The light is moved upwards, immediately behind the saddle which has two offset levels and is equipped with greater padding and two large handles on the sides. Furthermore, the "Cosa 2" is safer especially when braking. In fact, the integral braking system is completed by the EBC device which, via a magnetic sensor, prevents the front wheel from locking.

== Technical information ==
While the engine is virtually identical to that of the Vespa PX series of the time, there are three major differences in the design:

- The swingarm pivot on the Cosa is wider than that of the PX.
- The rear spring strut on the engine housing is shaped differently. This is because the rear suspension of Cosa is longer than that of the PX.
- The mounting for the rear brake is different due to the hydraulic rear brake.

In addition, the carburetor on the Vespa Cosa came stock fitted with an electronic fuel valve and automatic choke. It also had a digital tachometer (similar to that on later versions of the Vespa T5).

== Specifications ==
	Cosa 125	Cosa 150	Cosa 200^{1}	Cosa 200
Years in Production	1988 – 1998			
Chassis Number Prefix	VNR1T	VLR1T	VDR1M	VSR1T
Engine Type	Air-cooled, single-cylinder, two-stroke engine			
Displacement	123.4cc	150cc	197.97cc	197.97cc
Bore x Stroke (mm)	52.5 x 57.0	57.8 x 57.0	66.5 x 57.0	66.5 x 57.0
Power in kW (BHP)	5.88 kW (8 BHP) @5800 RPM	6.25 kW (8.5 BHP) @5700 RPM	7.35 kW (10 BHP) @5000 RPM	8.83 kW (12 BHP) @6000 RPM
Maximum Torque (Nm)	10.5 Nm @4500 RPM	12.75 Nm @4500 RPM		14.5 Nm @4500 RPM
Compression Ratio	9.2:1	9.2:1		8.8:1
Transmission	Four-speed manual, grip shift			
Top Speed	88 km/h	92 km/h	95 km/h	100 km/h
Fuel Capacity	7.7L			

1. In Germany, the Cosa 200 was available with a 10 BHP engine. This made it cheaper to insure in Germany.

== Filmography ==
List of films featuring the Vespa Cosa French kiss; I ragazzi della 3ª C

There’s also a white Vespa Cosa on the last episode of My Brilliant Friend (HBO), story placed in Napoli written by Elena Ferrante (HR)
