= Genuine Scooters =

Scooter manufacturer

Genuine Scooter Company.
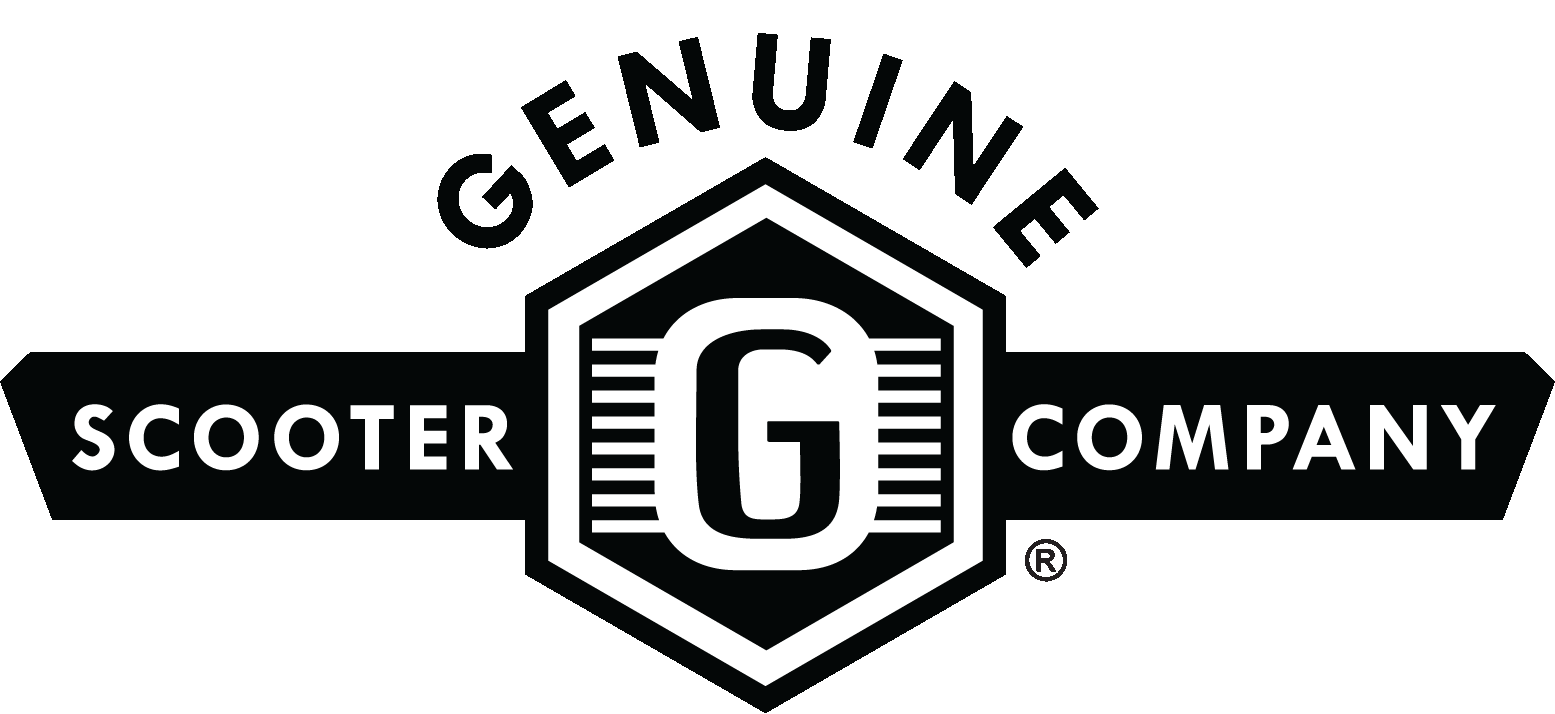
- Type: Private
- Founded: Chicago, Illinois (2002)
- Founders: Phillip McCaleb; William Jackson (Scooterworks Holdings, President, 2025–present); Dorothy Hanley (President, 2013–2024)
- Headquarters: United States
- Products: Motorscooters, Motorcycles
- Parent: Scooterworks Holdings LLC
- Subsidiaries: Scooterworks USA; Genuine Motorcycles
- Website: genuinescooters.com

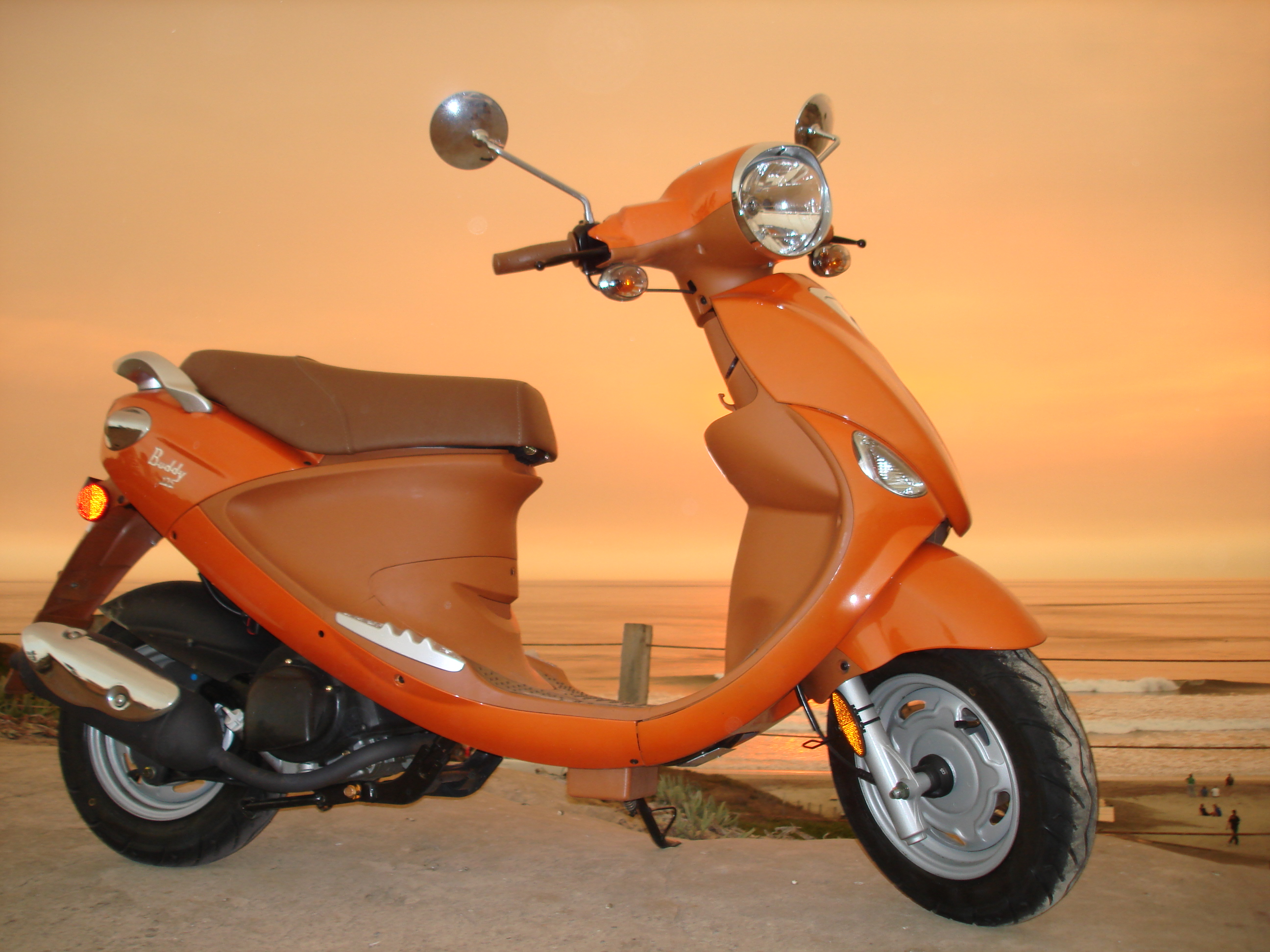
2007 Genuine Buddy

Genuine Scooters, officially The Genuine Scooter Company, is a Chicago-based designer, importer, and distributor of motor scooters and motorcycles. Founded in 2002 by Phillip McCaleb as a spin-off of the Scooterworks USA parts business, the company is best known for its Stella and Buddy scooter lines. The company markets its vehicles through a network of approximately 240 authorized dealers across the United States and partners with factories in India and Taiwan for manufacturing — it does not produce vehicles in-house.

By 2014, Genuine had become the third-largest scooter brand in the United States by unit sales, ranking behind only Honda and Yamaha. In 2018, the company expanded into motorcycles under the sister brand Genuine Motorcycles, introducing the G400C. Genuine Scooters is a subsidiary of Scooterworks Holdings LLC, the parent company it shares with Scooterworks USA.

== History ==
=== Origins: Scooterworks USA and Vespa of Chicago ===
The history of Genuine Scooters begins with Scooterworks USA, a Chicago scooter parts and repair business founded by Phillip McCaleb. McCaleb had earlier acquired Vespa of Chicago, a dealership on North Clark Street that had served as a Vespa importer and parts source until Piaggio withdrew entirely from the American market in 1985. McCaleb relaunched it as Scooterworks, which grew into the largest U.S. importer of vintage Vespa and Lambretta parts through a nationally distributed mail-order catalog.

McCaleb held an informal agreement with the Agnelli family — then owners of Fiat and Piaggio — that Scooterworks would become the national importer when Piaggio eventually returned to the U.S. market. When Piaggio changed ownership under Roberto Colaninno and established its own American distributorship in 1999, that arrangement collapsed. McCaleb responded by going directly to an old Piaggio manufacturing licensee: LML of India.

=== Founding (2002) ===
In 2002, McCaleb founded The Genuine Scooter Company. The venture attracted early investment from Jim Kolbe, a Wilmette, Illinois resident and Northwestern University alumnus who had spent 26 years as a senior vice president at United Stationers, a Fortune 500 company, and who joined in a business capacity in the company's early years.

The company was incorporated under the parent entity Scooterworks Holdings LLC and operated from a warehouse in Chicago's Humboldt Park neighborhood. The founding objective was to offer well-designed, reliable scooters at accessible price points — positioned between costly European imports and lower-quality Chinese models — while targeting everyday consumers rather than specialist enthusiasts.

=== The Stella and the LML partnership (2003–2017) ===
Genuine's first model was the Stella, introduced for the 2003 model year. McCaleb purchased from LML (Lohia Machinery Limited), an Indian manufacturer that had been a licensed producer of the Piaggio PX through the 1980s and 1990s. When LML's Piaggio licence ended in 1999, both parties retained rights to the PX design. Genuine worked alongside LML to adapt the platform for U.S. specifications — higher-quality brakes, improved mirrors and grips — and rebranded the result as the Stella (Italian for "star").

Early Stellas were powered by a 148cc two-stroke engine with a reed valve, producing more output than the contemporary Vespa PX150 two-stroke, though at higher emissions. The model bore a strong visual resemblance to a vintage Vespa; it was manufactured at the same Indian factory that had produced Piaggio-branded PX scooters. Genuine differentiated it with American-market colour options including electric blue, candy apple red, tangerine, and mint green, along with chrome trim.

In 2010, Genuine introduced a redesigned Stella with a 150cc four-stroke engine compliant with California Air Resources Board emissions standards. A further variant — the Stella 125 Automatic — arrived in 2014, offering the first continuously variable transmission (CVT) in the Stella line alongside a new 125cc engine.

The Stella was discontinued in mid-2017 after LML entered insolvency proceedings. LML ultimately reduced on three-wheeled vehicles and the Genuine supply relationship ended. Genuine subsequently introduced the Grand Tourer 150, a modern automatic scooter with styling influenced by the Stella's classic silhouette, as a partial replacement.

=== The Buddy and PGO partnership (2006) ===
Labour strikes at LML in India periodically disrupted Stella supply. To diversify production, Genuine established a second partnership in 2006 with PGO Scooters, a Taiwanese manufacturer. As with the LML arrangement, Genuine participated actively in product development and specification alongside PGO, rather than simply importing finished vehicles.

The PGO partnership produced the Buddy, an automatic scooter with a CVT transmission. Initially offered in 50cc and 125cc configurations, the Buddy became Genuine's bestselling and most enduring model. Its rounded retro-influenced body design combined practical specifications — including 90–100 miles per gallon fuel economy — with a low entry price. The 50cc Buddy qualified as a moped under the laws of many U.S. states, requiring no motorcycle driver's license.

Further models from the PGO partnership included the Roughhouse 50, styled more aggressively than the Buddy or Stella; the Blur 220i (later discontinued), a higher-displacement fuel-injected model capable of motorway speeds; and the Hooligan 170i, introduced in 2014, with twin headlights, fuel injection, and matte military-green color options.

=== Growth and recapitalization (2008–2014) ===
Genuine expanded rapidly during the mid-2000s scooter boom, growing its U.S. dealer network to several hundred outlets. The financial crisis of 2008 sharply reduced consumer spending on discretionary vehicles and triggered the failure of many Genuine dealers; the network contracted to below 200 locations. In 2011, the company received fresh capitalization from Livingstone Partners, a Chicago-based investment bank, which stabilized operations.

By 2014, the dealer network had recovered to approximately 240 locations. That year Genuine sold more than 6,000 units from an estimated 35,000 total U.S. scooter industry sales, making it the third-largest scooter brand in the country, ahead of Vespa.

=== Leadership change (2013) ===
In July 2013, Phillip McCaleb resigned as CEO of Genuine Scooters after more than a decade leading the company. William Jackson, majority shareholder of Scooterworks Holdings LLC, announced the transition; McCaleb moved to an advisory role and Dorothy Hanley succeeded him as President. McCaleb remained an active figure in the broader American scooter community following his resignation.

Hanley led the company through more than a decade of growth and product expansion. She stepped down as President on January 1, 2025, after being diagnosed with cancer. Hanley passed away in 2025. Following her departure, William Jackson, majority shareholder of Scooterworks Holdings LLC, stepped in as Interim President.

=== End of the Stella and LML partnership (2017) ===
See also: The Stella and the LML partnership. The original Stella was discontinued in mid-2017 after LML entered insolvency. The Grand Tourer 150 replaced it in Genuine's lineup from 2018.

=== Genuine Motorcycles (2018) ===
In 2018 Genuine launched Genuine Motorcycles, a sister brand separate from the scooter line. Its debut model was the G400C, a 400cc single-cylinder fuel-injected motorcycle designed as a lightweight, accessible entry-level machine for the U.S. market.

=== Death of Phillip McCaleb (2024) ===
Phillip McCaleb, co-founder of Genuine Scooters and founder of Scooterworks USA, died in October 2024 following a heart attack. He has been described within the American scooter industry as the most significant figure in building domestic scooter culture across roughly three decades, through his roles at Scooterworks, as the reviver of the Vespa Club of America, and as the driving force behind Genuine's rise to the third-largest scooter brand in the U.S.

=== Scooterworks USA acquires Parts for Scooters (2025) ===
In April 2025, Scooterworks USA — Genuine's sister company and parts supplier under the Scooterworks Holdings LLC parent — announced the acquisition of Parts for Scooters, a competing aftermarket parts retailer. The deal expanded Scooterworks' catalog to include broader coverage of Genuine, Honda, Yamaha, Vespa, and GY6-platform scooters, as well as ATVs, mini bikes, and pocket bikes.

=== NIU electric scooters and expansion into electric mobility ===
In 2019, Genuine Scooters became the U.S. distribution partner for NIU Technologies (NASDAQ: NIU), a Beijing-based manufacturer of smart electric two-wheeled vehicles. Under the agreement, Genuine distributes NIU electric scooters and mopeds through its existing national dealer network, targeting urban markets with a high density of commuters and university populations — with a particular focus on college and university communities.

NIU's sit-down electric scooters feature smartphone connectivity via a dedicated app, GPS tracking, anti-theft alerts, regenerative braking, and multi-mode riding settings. The following NIU models are distributed by Genuine in the U.S.:

Model	Category	Motor	Top Speed	Range	Notes
UQi GT	Electric moped	48V, low-speed	~28 mph	~40 mi	50cc-equivalent; no motorcycle licence required in most U.S. states
MQi+ Sport	Electric scooter	48V	~30 mph	~36 mi	Compact urban commuter
MQi GT100	Electric scooter	72V, 5 kW peak	62 mph	~62 mi	125cc-equivalent; motorcycle licence required
NQi Sport Standard	Electric scooter	60V, 3.5 kW (Bosch)	45 mph	~50 mi	Dual removable batteries
NQi Sport Extended	Electric scooter	60V, 3.5 kW (Bosch)	45 mph	~70 mi	Extended-range dual battery pack
NQi GTS Sport	Electric scooter	60V, 3.5 kW (Bosch)	50 mph	~56 mi	Higher-performance variant; dual batteries; cruise control

In addition to NIU sit-down scooters, Genuine introduced its own branded eBike and eScooter lines, sold under the Genuine name and available through the same dealer network:

Product	Type	Motor	Battery	Top Speed / Range	Notes
C5 500	eBike (step-thru)	500W hub	48V 13Ah (624 Wh)	20 mph / 40+ mi	Step-through frame; puncture-resistant 27.5" tires; removable battery
CU 500	eBike (utility)	500W hub	48V	20 mph / 40+ mi	Utility commuter style; 27.5" tires
X5 750F	eBike (fat-tire)	750W hub	48V 15Ah (720 Wh)	20 mph / 45+ mi	Fat 4" tires; full suspension; hydraulic front fork; LCD display; all-terrain
Chase	eScooter (stand-up)	500W / 800W peak	48V 15.6Ah (746.8 Wh)	20 mph / 30+ mi	Foldable; Bluetooth app; 10" tires; 6.7" standing deck; full suspension
Trail	eScooter (all-terrain)	500W / 800W peak	48V, removable	20 mph / 30+ mi	Foldable; dual-sport tires; full suspension; optional seat; regenerative braking

== Models ==
=== Current lineup (as of 2025) ===
Model	Displacement	Engine	Notes
Buddy 50	50 cc	2T	Entry-level; qualifies as moped in many U.S. states
Buddy 125	125 cc	4T	
Buddy 170i	170 cc	4T, fuel-injected	
Buddy KICK	125 cc	4T, fuel-injected	
Hooligan 170i	170 cc	4T, fuel-injected	Introduced 2014; twin headlights
Roughhouse 50	50 cc	2T	
Roughhouse 50 Sport	50 cc	2T	
Rattler 125	125 cc	4T	
Rattler 200	200 cc	4T	
Brio 50	50 cc	4T	
Urbano 50	50 cc	4T	
Urbano 125	125 cc	4T	
Urbano 200i	200 cc	4T, fuel-injected	

Genuine Motorcycles (separate brand):

Model	Displacement	Engine	Notes
G400C	400 cc	Single-cylinder, air-cooled, fuel-injected	Introduced 2018

=== Discontinued models ===
Model	Years active	Notes
Stella (2-stroke)	2003–2010	148cc 2T; made by LML; visually near-identical to vintage Piaggio PX
Stella (4-stroke)	2010–2017	150cc 4T; California-emissions compliant; discontinued after LML insolvency
Stella 125 Automatic	2014–2017	First Stella with CVT transmission
Grand Tourer 150	2018–	Replaced the Stella; modern platform; classic-influenced styling
Rattler 50 / 110	2006–c. 2007	Discontinued; similar to the Roughhouse
Blur 220i	—	Higher-displacement FI model; expressway-capable; discontinued

=== Limited-edition models ===
Genuine has periodically produced co-branded and special-edition scooters. These have included a "GB250" Stella with British-themed livery; a Black Cat Fireworks-branded scooter based on the Roughhouse; high-performance "Psycho" and "Riot" editions of the Buddy 50 and 125; and, produced in collaboration with Ferrara Pan Candy Company, an Atomic Fireball-branded Stella. In late 2013 a 10th Anniversary Diamond Edition Buddy 50 and 125 were released to mark the decade of the Buddy model line.

== Manufacturing ==
Genuine Scooters does not operate manufacturing facilities of its own. All production is contracted to third-party manufacturers. The Stella was manufactured by LML in India from the company's founding in 2002 until LML's insolvency in 2017. Since 2006, the Buddy and the majority of the current lineup have been produced by PGO Scooters in Taiwan.

In both partnerships, Genuine has taken an active product development role — working alongside manufacturers on specifications, ergonomics, colour options, and market-specific modifications — rather than functioning solely as an importer.

== Sister companies ==
Scooterworks USA, the parts and accessories retailer from which Genuine Scooters grew, operates as a separate entity under the same parent company, Scooterworks Holdings LLC. Scooterworks is the primary aftermarket parts supplier for Genuine models in the United States and also stocks parts for Vespa, Piaggio, Honda, Yamaha, and other scooter platforms. In April 2025, Scooterworks USA acquired Parts for Scooters, significantly expanding its catalog.

In 2019, Genuine created Chicago Scooter Company, a sister brand offering value-priced scooters intended to compete with lower-cost Chinese imports. Its lineup as of 2019 included the "Go," "Go MAX," and the both 50cc four-stroke models.
