= PGO Scooters =

Motor scooter brand

- Company type: Subsidiary
- Industry: Motorsports
- Founded: 1964
- Headquarters: Dacun, Changhua, Taiwan
- Products: Motorscooters, motorcycles, ATVs
- Parent: Motive Power Industry
- Website: http://www.pgo.com.tw/en/index.php

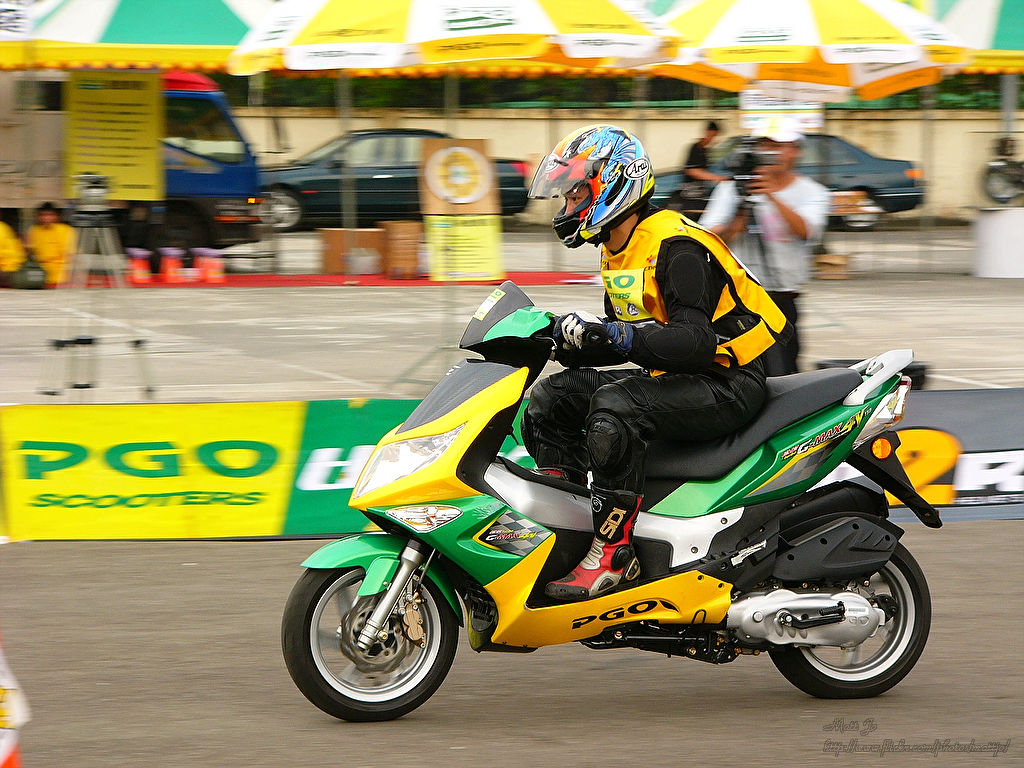
PGO G-MAX

PGO Scooters is a brand of motor scooter manufactured by Motive Power Industry, a scooter manufacturer founded in Taiwan in 1964.

PGO entered into a technical collaboration with Italy's Piaggio (the manufacturer of the Vespa) that lasted from 1972 to 1982; it is also from there that the company gets its name (P iag G i O).

PGO Scooters, in the United States, are imported and distributed by Genuine Scooters and its models are known there as the Hooligan, Blur, Buddy, and Roughhouse. In Canada, PGO scooters are sold under the PGO brand.

For a time, PGO Scooters also imported and distributed scooters with its own branding, namely the Bubu, G-Max, and PMX models.

PGO scooters were bought in large quantities by contract for the use of the national Danish mail company Post Danmark.

== See also ==
- List of companies of Taiwan
- List of motor scooter manufacturers and brands
- List of Taiwanese automakers
- Automotive industry in Taiwan
