= Vespa T5 =

Piaggio Vespa T5
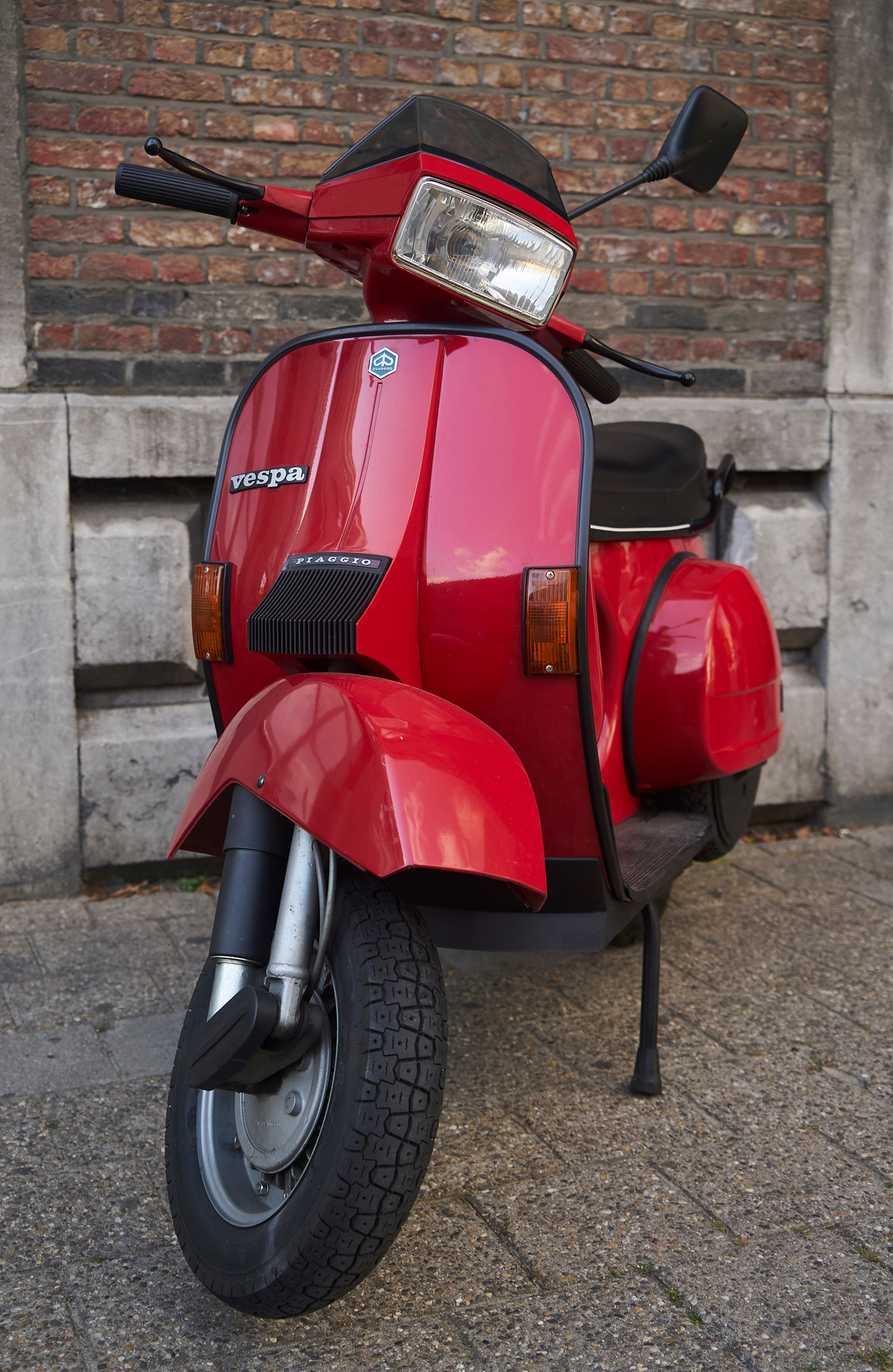
- Manufacturer: Piaggio
- Also called: T5
- Predecessor: Vespa PX
- Class: Road
- Engine: 125; 2-stroke, single cylinder, air-cooled
- Bore / stroke: 55×52 mm
- Compression ratio: 11.3/1
- Top speed: 100 kilometres (62 mi) per hour +
- Power: 12.0 bhp @ 6,500 rpm
- Ignition type: CDI
- Transmission: 4-speed
- Frame type: solo
- Suspension: single sided (front and rear)
- Brakes: Front and rear drum
- Tires: 10 inch (front and rear)
- Wheelbase: 1,235 millimetres (48.6 in)
- Weight: 112 kilograms (247 lb) (dry)
- Oil capacity: premix 2 stroke oil for engine and 250 ml engine oil for gear box and clutch
- Related: Vespa PX, Danmotor Excel 150

The Vespa T5 was a 125cc, single cylinder, 2 stroke scooter which was manufactured in the 1985-1999 period by Piaggio.The name "T5" referred to the 5 transfer ports of its engine case.

== Engine ==
The Vespa T5 was a true sporting scooter featuring:

- a 5 port aluminum cylinder design with Nikasil plating
- a squarish (55 x 52 mm) and lightweight piston design
- a lightened flywheel
- a shorter 24mm carburetor (Dell'Orto 24/24 G)

The T5 exceeded a top speed of 100 kilometres (62 mi) per hour, as standard, and compared favorably to the Vespa PX200; but its dependence on higher revs and relative lack of torque made it pale in adverse conditions, and/or with a pillion.

In the UK, and some entry-level Spanish and Italian models, premixing of 2-stroke oil was required; on French and German (and as an option in others) markets, autolube was standard, and accompanied by an electric start setup not available on base models.

The Vespa T5 had CDI ignition. Depending on the market, it either had no battery and all electrical components were powered by magneto after starting the engine. (UK, base models in Spain and Italy), Or if a battery was fitted, it had an electric starter, a fuel gauge, as well as a horn, which were powered directly by DC (battery).

== Body ==
Like classic Vespas, the scooter had full steel body panels and weighed around 112 kilograms (247 lb) dry. The engine was housed in the rear right side on a swing-arm and the left side housed a spare wheel. The rear brake was operated by a right foot pedal.

The T5 was sold in three generations:

1. Vespa T5 Mk1 (1985–1992): Cosmetically, the Vespa T5 Mk1 featured a rectangular headlight, an updated headset console which included a fuel level indicator and a digital or analog tachometer (depending on market), a flat rear end (achieved by adding the "square tail" sheet to a PX body), and a redesigned seat to complete the look. The front mudguard was smaller compared to the P-series mudguard and the steering head was attached to the fork via a locking ring instead of a handlebar-bolt. The scooter had a classic 4-speed manual left-hand twist grip gear change, a kick starter, and a front storage compartment with a black tray atop it, adorned with a "Pole Position", logo, designed to underline its sportiness.
2. Vespa T5 Classic (1992–1999): The T5 Classic had a standard Vespa PX frame but kept the T5 engine.
3. Vespa T5 Millennium (1999): In 1999 Piaggio ended production of the T5. A numbered limited edition of T5 Millennium scooters would mark the end to the T5. The T5 Millennium saw the addition of a front disk brake.

== Similar Scooters utilising the T5 Mk1 body ==
- Piaggio GS200: In Germany, Switzerland, the Benelux and Japan, Piaggio offered a similarly bodied version with a standard PX200 engine: the GS200.
- MotoVespa PX125 T5 Sport and TX200: The Spanish T5 had the 5 port engine, a VIN starting with 98C or 108C, and a plastic framed seat with a different seat pin. The TX had a similar body with a standard PX200 engine. The TX VIN started with 118C or 119C. A very limited amount of T5 and TX-es came without kickstarter.
- Piaggio&LML T5: The Indian LML Vespa T5 had a standard PX style engine and was sold as 100cc, 150cc and 200cc, respectively badged as T5-100, T5-150 and T5-200. The T5-200 was destined for the Australian market and was also imported into the UK. The LML T5 used a px type fork, captive bolt and front mudguard and didn't have the plastic spoiler.The speedo display didn't have a rev counter. There was a choice of kickstart or Elestart (ES).
- LML Vespa Select (launched 1993) & Select 2: were the successor of the LML Vespa T5, albeit with a standard PX150 engine, a redesigned console with no tachometer, and the steering head attached with a bolt instead of a locking ring. A four stroke version was launched in 2012 for the Indian market, named the LML Select 4.
- PT Danmotors Excel 200/150: Another similar scooter was manufactured by PT Danmotor of Jakarta, Indonesia.
- Vespa Taiwan PX150E-T5 had a T5 Mk1 body but a PX150 engine.
- PGO V6: PGO Taiwan produced a 150cc clone, badged V6.
