= Vespa PX =

Range of motorcycle scooters by Piaggio

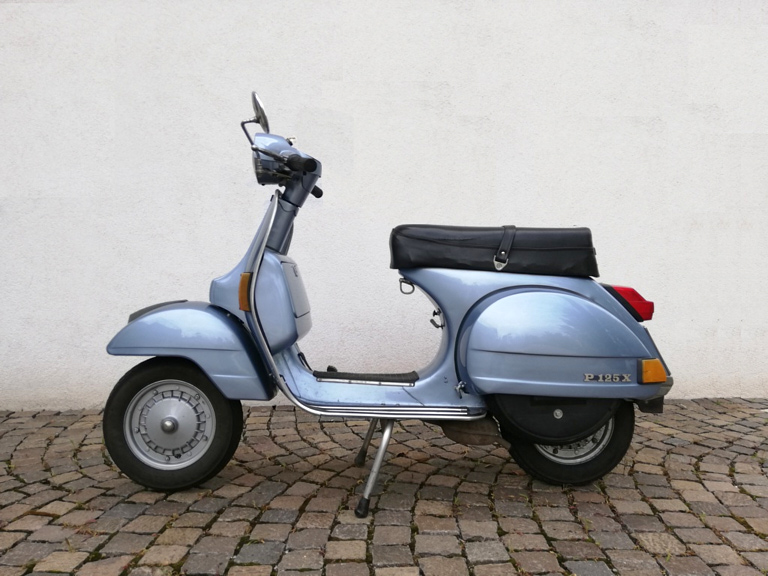
1980s Vespa P 125 X

The Vespa P/PX Series is a range of scooters manufactured by Piaggio under the Vespa brand.

== History ==
The Vespa PX was first presented in 1977 in Milan as the nuova linea model (new line). The Vespa was built with two drum brakes, a single-cylinder air cooled engine (aluminum head) and a steel chassis, but has been improved with a new front suspension and a revised rear axle for more stability. It was distributed as Vespa P 125 X and as Vespa P 200 E with an electronic ignition (E for Elettronica) and since 1978 as Vespa P 150 X. The PX 80 appeared in 1981 exclusively for the German market.

This electronic ignition was introduced to the other models, which then were called Vespa PX125E and Vespa PX150E, and in 1982 the Vespa P 200 E was called Vespa PX200E. In 1982, the Arcobaleno series was introduced (marketed outside of Italy as the Lusso series) with technological innovations such as separate lubrication and fuel gauges. In addition, the front brake pads were made to be self-centering, the wiring was altered for ease of maintenance, the same key was now used for the ignition and the steering lock, and several minor adjustments were made to the body. These included increasing the size of the glovebox, increasing the size of the rear mudguard, and a new horn grille.

In 1985 a sporty variant hit the market: The Vespa T5 Pole Position with almost 12 hp. In 1992, coinciding with the 50th anniversary of Vespa, a scooter was offered with the T5 engine and the PX style body. This was marketed as the Vespa PX 125 T5 Classic.

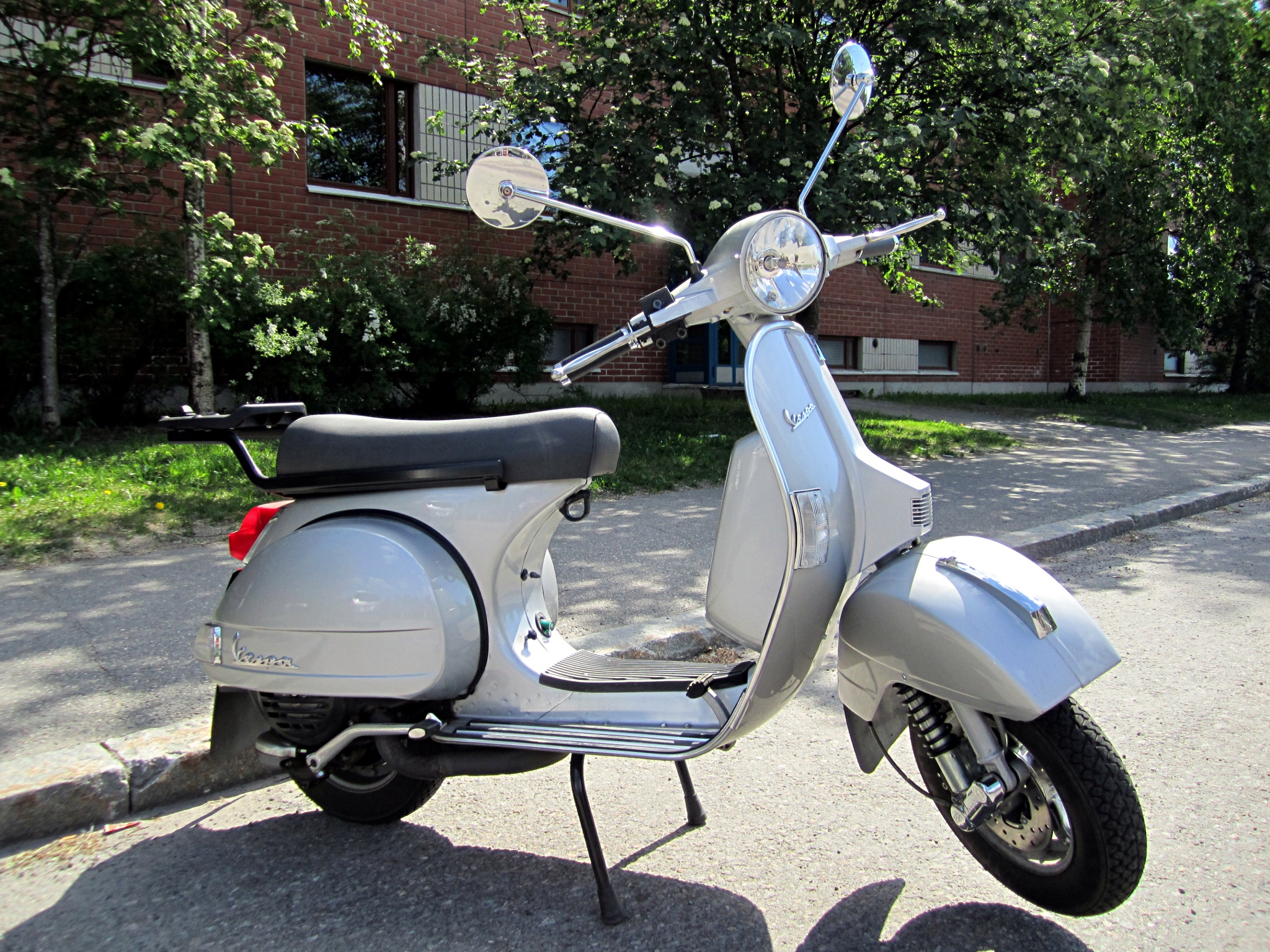
Vespa PX 200 Millennium (2003)

In 2007, the production of the Vespa PX was stopped and the last were sold as Ultima Serie (last series), a limited edition with a windshield, a luggage carrier in chrome and chrome wheels with whitewall tires. In 2010, the Vespa PX returned with a catalytic converter added to the two-stroke engine to meet the Euro 3 emission standards.

A final model called the '70th Anniversary' was produced and when the last stock was sold no more 2 stroke PXs were to be produced; Only the paint and seat differentiate it from the standard PX ZAPM74200 introduced in 2011.

Production of the PX ended in early 2017 as the PX engine failed to meet Euro 4 compliance emission requirements.

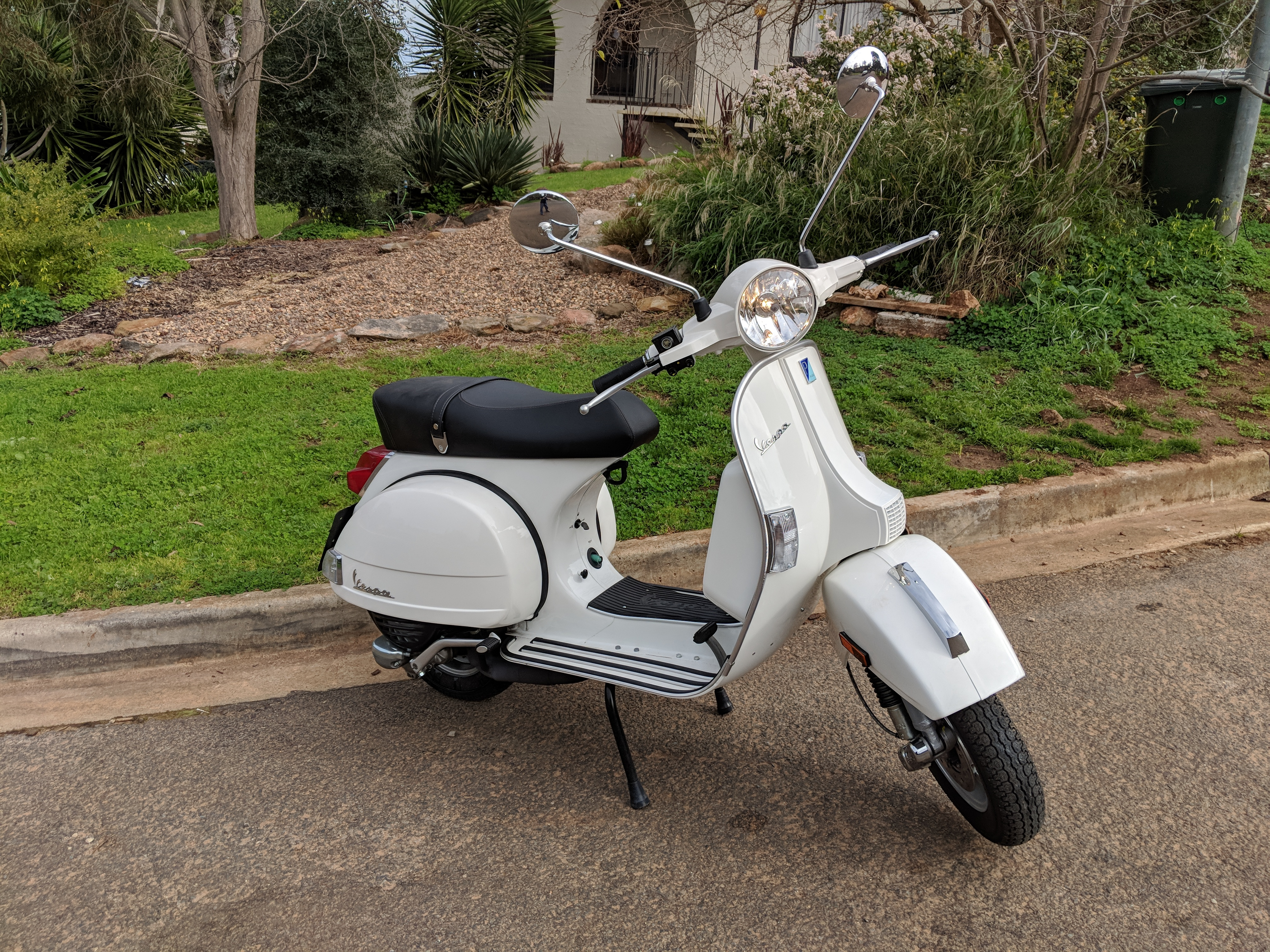
Vespa New PX150 (2017 Model - last year of production)

== Indonesian Market of Vespa P Series ==
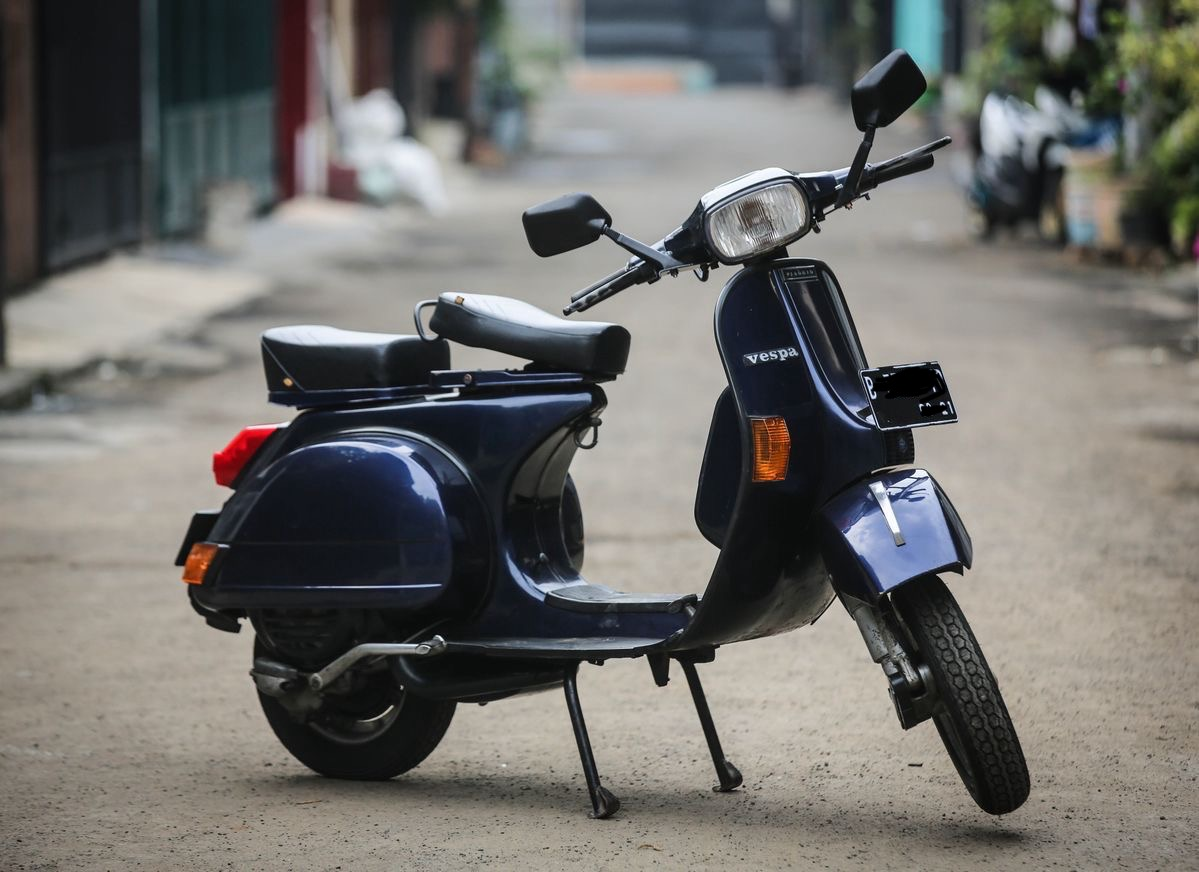
Indonesian 2001 Vespa P150XE “Exclusive 2”

The P/PX Series are also a very popular model in Indonesian Market, the P 150 X was introduced with no blinkers and oval headlight in 1978, the electronic ignition upgrade was introduced in 1983 as Vespa PX150E “Exclusive”, and later Vespa P150XE “Exclusive 2” in 1986 with the addition of “AOM” feature (Automatic Oil Mixture), minor facelift on speedometer with fuel gauges, and more modern-shaped blinkers. More luxurious and sporty model with identical looks to European T5 model was also added in 1987 called Vespa P150XE “Excel”, this model was very popular for the Indonesian market at the time because of the modern-styling and the first electric starter featured in Indonesian Vespa.

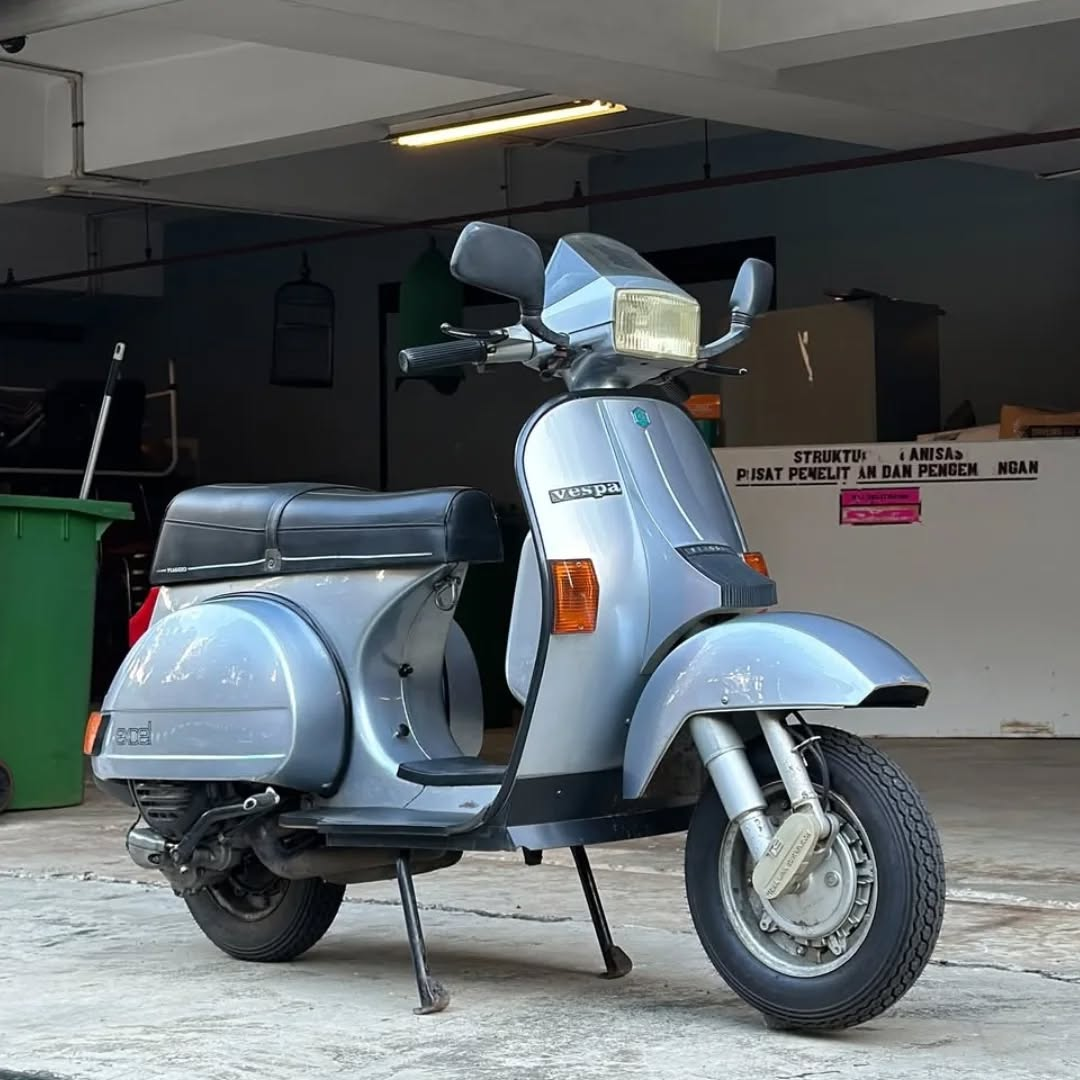
Indonesian Market 2004 Vespa P150XE Excel

The Indonesian Market also has its own endemic line of Vespa P-Series called the PS Series. Aimed for woman and short-figured Indonesian Vespa user, the PS Series feature distinctive differences like: 8” wheels, 1970s front suspension design, and rectangular headlamp (1980-1982 model).

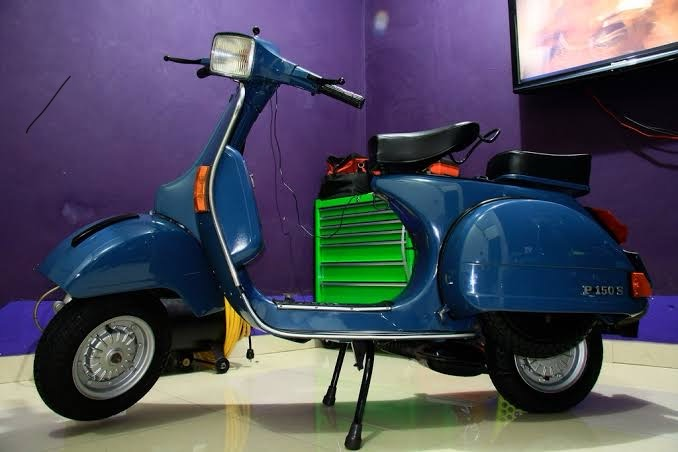
Indonesian Endemic Vespa P 150 S (with rectangular “TV” headlight)

The 200cc engine PX Model was also introduced as Vespa P200XE “Spartan” in 1985 with similar look with the regular Exclusive model, except for the front nose and side trim, and later replaced with P200XE “Excel” in 1987 (identical look with the 150cc variant). The 200cc model ceased production in 1991, while 150cc models last until 2001 without any major update since 1986.

== Comparison of Various P Series Models ==
	P 125 X	P 150 X PX 150 E ^{1}	P 200 E PX 200 E ^{1}	PX 80 E	PX 125 E	PX 125 T5	PX 200 E GS	PX 125	PX 150	PX 200	PX 125	PX 150
Years in Production	1977–1981	1978–1997	1977–1997	1981–1986	1982–1997	1986–1999	1987–1998	1998–2008	1998–2008	1998–2001	2011–2016	2011–2016
Chassis Number Prefix	VNX1T	VLX1T	VSX1T	V8X1T; V8X5T ^{2}	VNX2T	VNX5T	VSX1T	ZAPM50100	ZAPM09401	VSX1T	ZAPM47100	ZAPM74200
Engine Type	Air-cooled, single-cylinder, two-stroke engine											
Engine Capacity	123cc	150cc	198cc	79cc	123cc	123cc	198cc	123cc	151cc	198cc	123cc	150cc
Bore x Stroke (mm)	52.5x57	57.8x57	66.5x57	46x48	52.5x57	55x52	66.5x57	52.5x57	57.8x57	66.5x57	52.5x57	57.8x57
Power in kW (BHP)	5.75 kW (8 BHP) @5600 RPM	6.7 kW (9 BHP) @6000 RPM	7.35 kW (10 BHP) @5000 RPM	5 kW (7 BHP) @6000 RPM	6.3 kW (8.6 BHP) @6000 RPM	9 kW (12 BHP) @6500 RPM	9 kW (12 BHP) @5700 RPM	6.5 kW (9 BHP)	6.0 kW (8,0 BHP)	9 kW (12 BHP)	4.8 kW (6.5 BHP) @6000 RPM	5.8 kW (7.9 BHP) @6000 RPM
Torque (Nm)						12.4 @4800 RPM					9.5 @4250 RPM	11.2 @4000 RPM
Transmission	Four-speed manual, grip shift											
Top Speed	86 km/h	90 km/h	95 km/h	80 km/h	89 km/h	100 km/h	105 km/h	90 km/h	91 km/h	95 km/h	84 km/h	88 km/h
Fuel tank capacity	8 liters (including 2.5 liter reserve)											
Emission Standards Conformed to								Euro 2			Euro 3	

1. The same chassis number applies to the Arcobaleno (or Lusso) models.
2. This model was in production from 1985 and marketed exclusively in Germany.
